= 34th Lambda Literary Awards =

2022 awards ceremony for LGBTQ+ literature

The 34th Lambda Literary Awards were announced on June 11, 2022 to honour works of LGBT literature published in 2021.

Nominees were announced in March 2022.

== Special awards ==
Special awards recipients
Category	Winner
Jeanne Córdova Prize for Lesbian/Queer Nonfiction	Aisha Sabatini Sloan
Jim Duggins Outstanding Mid-Career Novelists' Prize	Vi Khi Nao and Silas House
Judith A. Markowitz Emerging Writer Award	Ching-In Chen and Morgan Thomas
Randall Kenan Prize for Black LGBTQ Fiction	Kalynn Bayron

== Nominees and winners ==
34th Lambda Literary Awards winners and finalists
Category	Author	Title	Result
Bisexual Fiction	Alix Ohlin	We Want What We Want	Winner
Bisexual Fiction	S. J. Sindu	Blue-Skinned Gods	Finalist
Bisexual Fiction	Melissa Broder	Milk Fed	Finalist
Bisexual Fiction	Tiphanie Yanique	Monster in the Middle	Finalist
Bisexual Fiction	Jen Silverman	We Play Ourselves	Finalist
Bisexual Nonfiction	Aisha Sabatini Sloan	Borealis	Winner
Bisexual Nonfiction	Hasanthika Sirisena	Dark Tourist: Essays	Finalist
Bisexual Nonfiction	Jen Winston	Greedy: Notes from a Bisexual Who Wants Too Much	Finalist
Bisexual Nonfiction	Daisy Hernández	The Kissing Bug: A True Story of a Family, an Insect, and a Nation's Neglect of a Deadly Disease	Finalist
Bisexual Nonfiction	Courtney Cook	The Way She Feels: My Life on the Borderline in Pictures and Pieces	Finalist
Bisexual Poetry	Aurielle Marie	Gumbo Ya Ya	Winner
Bisexual Poetry	Muriel Leung	Imagine Us, The Swarm	Finalist
Bisexual Poetry	CM Burroughs	Master Suffering	Finalist
Bisexual Poetry	Paige Quiñones	The Best Prey	Finalist
Bisexual Poetry	Jackie Wang	The Sunflower Cast a Spell to Save Us from the Void	Finalist
Gay Fiction	Brontez Purnell	100 Boyfriends	Winner
Gay Fiction	Selva Almada	Brickmakers	Finalist
Gay Fiction	Jaime Cortez	Gordo	Finalist
Gay Fiction	Yang Huang	My Good Son	Finalist
Gay Fiction	Paul Mendez	Rainbow Milk	Finalist
Gay Memoir/Biography	Brian Broome	Punch Me Up to the Gods: A Memoir	Winner
Gay Memoir/Biography	Rajiv Mohabir	Antiman: A Hybrid Memoir	Finalist
Gay Memoir/Biography	John Paul Brammer	Hola Papi	Finalist
Gay Memoir/Biography	Peter Staley	Never Silent: ACT UP and My Life in Activism	Finalist
Gay Memoir/Biography	Luis Felipe Fabre with JD Pluecker (trans.)	Writing with Caca / Escribir con Caca	Finalist
Gay Poetry	John Keene	Punks: New & Selected Poems	Winner
Gay Poetry	Nicholas Wong	Besiege Me	Finalist
Gay Poetry	Michael Walsh	Creep Love	Finalist
Gay Poetry	Miguel Murphy	Shoreditch	Finalist
Gay Poetry	Derrick Austin	Tenderness	Finalist
Gay Romance	Larry Benjamin	Excellent Sons: A Love Story in Three Acts	Winner
Gay Romance	Sander Santiago	Best of the Wrong Reasons	Finalist
Gay Romance	John Patrick	Dublin Bay	Finalist
Gay Romance	Lance Ringel	Floridian Nights	Finalist
Gay Romance	Farhad J. Dadyburjor	The Other Man	Finalist
Lesbian Fiction	Mia McKenzie	Skye Falling	Winner
Lesbian Fiction	Lauren Groff	Matrix	Finalist
Lesbian Fiction	Kirstin Valdez Quade	The Five Wounds	Finalist
Lesbian Fiction	Venita Blackburn	How to Wrestle a Girl	Finalist
Lesbian Fiction	Kristen Arnett	With Teeth	Finalist
Lesbian Memoir/Biography	Sophie Santos	The One You Want to Marry (And Other Identities I've Had)	Winner
Lesbian Memoir/Biography	Grace Perry	The 2000s Made Me Gay: Essays on Pop Culture	Finalist
Lesbian Memoir/Biography	Leslie Cohen	The Audacity of a Kiss: Love, Art, and Liberation	Finalist
Lesbian Memoir/Biography	Jonathan Ned Katz	The Daring Life and Dangerous Times of Eve Adams	Finalist
Lesbian Memoir/Biography	Adele Bertei	Why Labelle Matters	Finalist
Lesbian Poetry	Tamiko Beyer	Last Days	Winner
Lesbian Poetry	Rosamond S. King	All the Rage	Finalist
Lesbian Poetry	Grace Lau	The Language We Were Never Taught to Speak	Finalist
Lesbian Poetry	Donika Kelly	The Renunciations: Poems	Finalist
Lesbian Poetry	Arisa White	Who's Your Daddy	Finalist
Lesbian Romance	Milena McKay	The Headmistress	Winner
Lesbian Romance	Jae	Chemistry Lessons	Finalist
Lesbian Romance	E. J. Noyes	Go Around	Finalist
Lesbian Romance	Haley Cass	In the Long Run	Finalist
Lesbian Romance	Gerri Hill	Red Tide at Heron Bay	Finalist
LGBTQ Anthology	Briona Simone Jones	Mouths of Rain: An Anthology of Black Lesbian Thought	Winner
LGBTQ Anthology	Mattilda Bernstein Sycamore (ed.)	Between Certain Death and a Possible Future: Queer Writing on Growing Up with the AIDS Crisis	Finalist
LGBTQ Anthology	Martin F. Manalansan IV, Alice Y. Hom, and Kale Bantigue Fajardo	Q & A: Voices from Queer Asian North America	Finalist
LGBTQ Anthology	Kemi Adeyemi, Kareem Khubchandani, and Ramón H. Rivera-Servera (eds.)	Queer Nightlife	Finalist
LGBTQ Anthology	Leanna Keyes, Lindsey Mantoan, and Angela Farr Schiller (eds.)	The Methuen Drama Book of Trans Plays	Finalist
LGBTQ Children's/Middle Grade	JR Ford and Vanessa Ford	Calvin	Winner
LGBTQ Children's/Middle Grade	Ashley Herring Blake	Hazel Bly and the Deep Blue Sea	Finalist
LGBTQ Children's/Middle Grade	Charlotte Sullivan Wild with Charlene Chua (illus.)	Love, Violet	Finalist
LGBTQ Children's/Middle Grade	Rob Sanders	Stitch by Stitch: Cleve Jones and the AIDS Memorial Quilt	Finalist
LGBTQ Children's/Middle Grade	Basil Sylvester and Kevin Sylvester	The Fabulous Zed Watson!	Finalist
LGBTQ Drama	R. Eric Thomas	Mrs. Harrison	Winner
LGBTQ Drama	Daniel Alexander Jones	Love Like Light	Finalist
LGBTQ Drama	storäe michele	mama [rose.]	Finalist
LGBTQ Drama	Kheven LaGrone	Pillow Talk	Finalist
LGBTQ Drama	L M Feldman	Thrive, or What You Will {an epic}	Finalist
LGBTQ Erotica	Samuel R. Delany	Big Joe	Winner
LGBTQ Erotica	MJ Lyons	Queer Werewolves Destroy Capitalism: Smutty Stories	Finalist
LGBTQ Erotica	Tab Kimpton and Harry-Anne Bentley (eds.)	Nectar: Trans Femme and Non Binary Erotic Comics Anthology	Finalist
LGBTQ Erotica	Tab Kimpton and Jade Sarson (eds.)	Ambrosia: Trans Masc and Non Binary Erotic Comics Anthology	Finalist
LGBTQ Erotica	Levi Huxton	The Lodger, That Summer	Finalist
LGBTQ Graphic Novel	Lee Lai	Stone Fruit	Winner
LGBTQ Graphic Novel	Crystal Frasier and Val Wise with Oscar O. Jupiter (lettering)	Cheer Up! Love and Pompoms	Finalist
LGBTQ Graphic Novel	Syan Rose	Our Work Is Everywhere: An Illustrated Oral History of Queer & Trans Resistance	Finalist
LGBTQ Graphic Novel	Hiromi Goto with Ann Xu (illus.)	Shadow Life	Finalist
LGBTQ Graphic Novel	Kat Leyh	Thirsty Mermaids	Finalist
LGBTQ Mystery	John Copenhaver	The Savage Kind	Winner
LGBTQ Mystery	P.J. Vernon	Bath Haus	Finalist
LGBTQ Mystery	Jennifer Hanlon Wilde	Finding the Vein	Finalist
LGBTQ Mystery	Michael Nava	Lies With Man	Finalist
LGBTQ Mystery	Stephen Spotswood	Murder Under Her Skin	Finalist
LGBTQ Nonfiction	Sarah Schulman	Let the Record Show: A Political History of ACT UP New York, 1987–1993	Winner
LGBTQ Nonfiction	Melissa Febos	Girlhood	Finalist
LGBTQ Nonfiction	Akwaeke Emezi	Dear Senthuran	Finalist
LGBTQ Nonfiction	Adam Zmith	Deep Sniff: A History of Poppers and Queer Futures	Finalist
LGBTQ Nonfiction	Kazim Ali	Northern Light: Power, Land, and the Memory of Water	Finalist
LGBTQ Science Fiction/Fantasy/Horror	Cadwell Turnbull	No Gods, No Monsters	Winner
LGBTQ Science Fiction/Fantasy/Horror	Arkady Martine	A Desolation Called Peace	Finalist
LGBTQ Science Fiction/Fantasy/Horror	Honni van Rijswijk	Breeder	Finalist
LGBTQ Science Fiction/Fantasy/Horror	Olivia Tapiero with Kit Schluter (trans.)	Phototaxis	Finalist
LGBTQ Science Fiction/Fantasy/Horror	Neon Yang	The Tensorate Series	Finalist
LGBTQ Studies	Anna Lvovsky	Vice Patrol: Cops, Courts, and the Struggle over Urban Gay Life before Stonewall	Winner
LGBTQ Studies	Gila Ashtor	Homo Psyche: On Queer Theory and Erotophobia	Finalist
LGBTQ Studies	C. Winter Han	Racial Erotics: Gay Men of Color, Sexual Racism, and the Politics of Desire	Finalist
LGBTQ Studies	Leah DeVun	The Shape of Sex	Finalist
LGBTQ Studies	Howard Chiang	Transtopia in the Sinophone Pacific	Finalist
LGBTQ Young Adult	A.R Capetta	The Heartbreak Bakery	Winner
LGBTQ Young Adult	Adiba Jaigirdar	Hani and Ishu's Guide to Fake Dating	Finalist
LGBTQ Young Adult	Aden Polydoros	The City Beautiful	Finalist
LGBTQ Young Adult	Isaac Fitzsimons	The Passing Playbook	Finalist
LGBTQ Young Adult	Linsey Miller	What We Devour	Finalist
Transgender Fiction	Jeanne Thornton	Summer Fun	Winner
Transgender Fiction	Torrey Peters	Detransition, Baby	Finalist
Transgender Fiction	Callum Angus	A Natural History of Transition	Finalist
Transgender Fiction	Megan Milks	Margaret and the Mystery of the Missing Body	Finalist
Transgender Fiction	Shelley Parker-Chan	She Who Became the Sun	Finalist
Transgender Nonfiction	Da'Shaun Harrison	Belly of the Beast: The Politics of Anti-Fatness as Anti-Blackness	Winner
Transgender Nonfiction	Francisco Galarte	Brown Trans Figurations: Rethinking Race, Gender, and Sexuality in Chicanx/Latinx Studies	Finalist
Transgender Nonfiction	Ivan Coyote	Care Of: Letters, Connections, and Cures	Finalist
Transgender Nonfiction	Alicia Spencer-Hall and Blake Gutt (eds.)	Trans and Genderqueer Subjects in Medieval Hagiography	Finalist
Transgender Nonfiction	Lucie Fielding	Trans Sex: Clinical Approaches to Trans Sexualities and Erotic Embodiments	Finalist
Transgender Poetry	Mason J	Crossbones on My Life	Winner
Transgender Poetry	Dani Putney	Salamat sa Intersectionality	Finalist
Transgender Poetry	Lindsay Choi	Transverse	Finalist
Transgender Poetry	Andrea Abi-Karam	Villainy	Finalist
Transgender Poetry	Raquel Salas Rivera	x/ex/exis	Finalist
