= Lambda Literary Award for Transgender Literature =

Award for transgender literature

- Awarded for: Transgender Literature
- Sponsored by: Lambda Literary Foundation
- Date: Annual
- Website: lambdaliterary.org/awards/

The Lambda Literary Award for Transgender Literature is an annual literary award, presented by the Lambda Literary Foundation, that awards works of transgender literature.

Awards are granted based on literary merit and transgender content, and therefore, the writer may be cisgender. The award can be separated into three categories: transgender fiction, transgender nonfiction, and transgender poetry. Early iterations of the award were defined through broader categories: bisexual/transgender literature, transgender/genderqueer literature, and transgender literature.

== Criteria ==
=== Transgender fiction ===
The award for transgender fiction recognizes "[n]ovels, novellas, short story collections, and anthologies with prominent ... trans characters and/or content of strong significance to the ... trans communities." The list "[m]ay include historical novels, comics, cross-genre works of fiction, humor, and other styles of fiction."

=== Transgender nonfiction ===
The award for transgender nonfiction recognizes "[n]onfiction works with content of strong significance to members of the ... trans communities," including "a wide range of subjects for the general or academic reader."

=== Transgender poetry ===
The award for transgender poetry recognizes individual volumes of poems and poem collections with transgender content. Chapbooks are ineligible for the prize, as well as "[u]pdated editions of previously published works ... unless at least 50% of the poetry (not the supplemental text) is new."

== History ==
Though the Lambda Literary Foundation has been giving out awards since 1989, a category honoring works with transgender content was not added until 1997. In the history of the awards, the categories for transgender and bisexual literature have remained contentious. Between 1997 and 2009, nonfiction, fiction, and poetry with transgender content was combined into a single category, transgender literature, aside from 2001, in which the bisexual and transgender literature was counted as one category.

=== Controversy ===
==== Bailey's The Man Who Would Be Queen ====
On February 2, 2004, the Lambda Literary Foundation added The Man Who Would Be Queen by J. Michael Bailey to their list of finalists or a Lambda Literary Award for Transgender Literature but removed the book on March 12, 2004 after people protested and petitioned for the removal due to transphobic content. Executive Director Jim Marks had approved the book and defended its inclusion in the awards. He resigned the following year after serving the Foundation since 1996, and the Foundation closed their website, eliminating any evidence of the controversy.

Critics noted that two major issues with the committee that led to such an issue. First, books are nominated by publishers, then made finalists by booksellers, making the award more about potential sales than literary merit. Second, the committee held no members of the transgender community, "which explains how they were unaware that the vast majority of the community found the book defamatory and irresponsible."

The Foundation launched a new website in 2006 under the guidance of Executive Director Charles Flowers, who also worked to improve the award process. While books would still be nominated by publishers and booksellers, the Foundation would have their own committee of judges, which would include at least one transgender individual.

Despite recovery efforts, many outlets have continued to use the fact that the Foundation nominated The Man Who Would Be Queen for an award as a way to validate the book's message.

==== Dreger's Galileo's Middle Finger ====
In 2016, the Lambda Literary Foundation nominated Galileo's Middle Finger by Alice Dreger for a Lambda Literary Award for Transgender Nonfiction, even though the author "endorse[d] and actively promote[d] the theories in Bailey's book," The Man Who Would Be Queen. "[A] half-dozen national LGBT organizations" urged the Foundation to remove Galileo's Middle Finger from their list of nominees for the award, a request the Foundation later granted, stating, "The nomination process did not include full vetting of all works to be certain that each work is consistent with the mission of affirming LGBTQ lives."

== Recipients ==
Year	Category	Author	Work	Result	Ref.
1997	Literature	Loren Cameron	Body Alchemy	Winner	
1997	Literature	Phyllis Burke	Gender Shock	Finalist	
1997	Literature	Leon E. Pettiway	Honey, Honey Miss Thang	Finalist	
1997	Literature	Catalina de Erauso	Lieutenant Nun	Finalist	
1997	Literature	Leslie Feinberg	Transgender Warriors	Finalist	
1998	Literature	Dylan Scholinski and Jane Meredith Adams	The Last Time I Wore a Dress	Winner	
1998	Literature	Annick Prieur	Mema's House, Mexico City: On Transvestites, Queens, and Machos	Finalist	
1998	Literature	Carol Queen and Lawrence Schimel (editors)	PoMoSexuals: Challenging Assumptions about Gender and Sexuality	Finalist	
1998	Literature	Riki Wilchins	Read My Lips: Sexual Subversions and the End of Gender	Finalist	
1998	Literature	Pat Califia	Sex Changes	Finalist	
1999	Literature	Michael R. Gorman	The Empress Is a Man	Winner	
1999	Literature	Will Roscoe and Stephen Murray (editors)	Boy-Wives and Female Husbands	Finalist	
1999	Literature	Judith Halberstam	Female Masculinity	Finalist	
1999	Literature	Diane Wood	Suits Me: The Double Life of Billy Tipton	Finalist	
1999	Literature	Leslie Feinberg	Trans Liberation	Finalist	
2000	Literature	Jackie Kay	Trumpet	Winner	
2000	Literature	Deirdre McCloskey	Crossing	Finalist	
2000	Literature	Jacobo Schifter	From Toads to Queens	Finalist	
2000	Literature	Del LaGrace and Jack Halberstam	The Drag King Book	Finalist	
2000	Literature	Jason Cromwell	Transmen and FTMs	Finalist	
2001	Literature	David Ebershoff	The Danish Girl	Winner	
2001	Literature	Karleen Pendleton Jimenez	Are You a Boy or a Girl?	Finalist	
2001	Literature	John Colapinto	As Nature Made Him	Finalist	
2001	Literature	Noelle Howey and Ellen Samuels (editors)	Out of the Ordinary	Finalist	
2001	Literature	Chris Bohjalian	Trans-Sister Radio	Finalist	
2002	Bisexual/Transgender Literature	Virginia Ramey Mollenkott	Omnigender: A Trans-religious Approach	Winner	
2002	Bisexual/Transgender Literature	Bill Brnt and Carol Queen (editors)	Best Bisexual Erotica, Volume 2	Finalist	
2002	Bisexual/Transgender Literature	Vanessa Sheridan	Crossing Over: Liberating the Transgendered Christian	Finalist	
2002	Bisexual/Transgender Literature	Jonathan Branton	Dragged!! To His Senses	Finalist	
2002	Bisexual/Transgender Literature	Sparrow L. Patterson	Synthetic Bi Products	Finalist	
2003	Literature	Noelle Howey	Dress Codes	Winner	
2003	Literature	Chloe Brushwood Rose and Anna Camilleri (editors)	Brazen Femme	Finalist	
2003	Literature	Joan Nestle, Riki Wilchins and Claire Howell (editors)	GenderQueer	Finalist	
2003	Literature	Jeffrey Eugenides	Middlesex	Finalist	
2003	Literature	T Cooper	Some of the Parts	Finalist	
2004	Literature	Jennifer Finney Boylan	She's Not There	Winner	
2004	Literature	Donna Troka, Kathleen Lebesco, and Jean Noble (editors)	The Drag King Anthology	Finalist	
2004	Literature	Justin Tanis	Trans-gendered	Finalist	
2004	Literature	Virginia Ramey and Vanessa Sheridan	Transgender Journeys	Finalist	
2005	Literature	Mariette Pathy Allen	The Gender Frontier	Winner	
2005	Literature	Jamison Green	Becoming a Visible Man	Finalist	
2005	Literature	Morty Diamond (editor)	From the Inside Out: Radical Gender Transformation, FTM and Beyond	Finalist	
2005	Literature	Julie Anne Peters	Luna	Finalist	
2005	Literature	Helen Boyd	My Husband Betty: Love, Sex and Life with a Crossdresser	Finalist	
2006	Literature	Charlie Anders	Choir Boy	Winner	
2006	Literature	Tennessee Jones	Deliver Me from Nowhere	Finalist	
2006	Literature	Judith Halberstam	In a Queer Time and Place	Finalist	
2006	Literature	Matt Kailey	Just Add Hormones	Finalist	
2006	Literature	Deborah Rudacille	The Riddle of Gender	Finalist	
2007	Literature	Susan Stryker and Stephen Whittle (editors)	The Transgender Studies Reader	Winner	
2007	Literature	Paisley Currah, Richard M. Juang, and Shannon Price Minter (editors)	Transgender Rights	Finalist	
2007	Literature	Leslie Feinberg	Drag King Dreams	Finalist	
2007	Literature	Alicia E. Goranson	Supervillainz	Finalist	
2007	Literature	Max Wolf Valerio	The Testosterone Files	Finalist	
2008	Literature	Cris Beam	Transparent	Winner	
2008	Literature	LeeRay M. Costa,	Male Bodies, Women's Souls	Finalist	
2008	Literature	Mattilda Bernstein Sycamore	Nobody Passes	Finalist	
2008	Literature	Eli Clare	The Marrow's Telling	Finalist	
2008	Literature	Aaron Raz and Hilda Raz	What Becomes You	Finalist	
2009	Literature	Thea Hillman	Intersex (For Lack of a Better Word)	Winner	
2009	Literature	Marcus Ewert and Rex Ray	10,000 Dresses	Finalist	
2009	Literature	Ely Shipley	Boy with Flowers	Finalist	
2009	Literature	Susan Stryker	Transgender History	Finalist	
2009	Literature	Scott Schofield	Two Truths and a Lie	Finalist	
2010	Literature	Lynn Breedlove	Lynnee Breedlove's One Freak Show	Winner	
2010	Literature	kari edwards	Bharat Jiva	Finalist	
2010	Literature	S. Bear Bergman	The Nearest Exit May Be Behind You	Finalist	
2010	Literature	Joy Ladin	Transmigration	Finalist	
2010	Literature	Adam Lowe	Troglodyte Rose	Finalist	
2011	Fiction	Zoe Whittall	Holding Still for As Long As Possible	Winner	
2011	Fiction	Justin Hall with Diego Gomez, Fred Noland, and Jon Macy	Glamazonia: The Uncanny Super Tranny	Finalist	
2011	Fiction	Catherine Ryan Hyde	Jumpstart the World	Finalist	
2011	Nonfiction	Noach Dzmura (editor)	Balancing on the Mechitza: Transgender in Jewish Community	Winner	
2011	Nonfiction	Rebecca Swan	Assume Nothing	Finalist	
2011	Nonfiction	Kate Bornstein and S. Bear Bergman (editors)	Gender Outlaws: The Next Generation	Finalist	
2011	Nonfiction	Kristen Schilt	Just One of the Guys?: Transgender Men and the Persistence of Gender Inequality	Finalist	
2011	Nonfiction	Michelle Alexander and Michelle Diane Rose	The Color of Sunlight	Finalist	
2012	Fiction	Tristan Taormino (editor)	Take Me There: Trans and Genderqueer Erotica	Winner	
2012	Fiction	Cris Beam	I am J	Finalist	
2012	Fiction	L.A. Witt	Static	Finalist	
2012	Fiction	Rafe Posey	The Book of Broken Hymns	Finalist	
2012	Fiction	Dana De Young	The Butterfly and the Flame	Finalist	
2012	Nonfiction	Justin Vivian Bond	Tango: My Childhood, Backwards and in High Heels	Winner	
2012	Nonfiction	Eric A. Stanley and Nat Smith (editors)	Captive Genders: Trans Embodiment and the Prison Industrial Complex	Finalist	
2012	Nonfiction	Megan M. Rohrer and Zander Keig (editors)	Letters For My Brothers: Transitional Wisdom in Retrospect	Finalist	
2012	Nonfiction	Dean Spade	Normal Life: Administrative Violence, Critical Trans Politics and the Limits of Law	Finalist	
2012	Nonfiction	Peter Boag	Re-Dressing America's Frontier Past	Finalist	
2013	Fiction	Tom Léger and Riley MacLeod (editors)	The Collection: Short Fiction From The Transgender Vanguard	Winner	
2013	Fiction	Rachel Gold	Being Emily	Finalist	
2013	Fiction	Roz Kaveney	Dialectic of the Flesh	Finalist	
2013	Fiction	Rae Spoon	First Spring Grass Fire	Finalist	
2013	Fiction	Michael Quadland	Offspring	Finalist	
2013	Nonfiction	Anne Enke (editor)	Transfeminist Perspectives in and beyond Transgender and Gender Studies	Winner	
2013	Nonfiction	Ryka Aoki	Seasonal Velocities	Finalist	
2013	Nonfiction	Matt Kailey	Teeny Weenies and Other Short Subjects	Finalist	
2013	Nonfiction	Dylan Edwards	Transposes	Finalist	
2014	Fiction	Trish Salah	Wanting in Arabic	Winner	
2014	Fiction	Imogen Binnie	Nevada	Finalist	
2014	Fiction	Llywelyn Jones	Tiresias	Finalist	
2014	Nonfiction	Mattilda Bernstein Sycamore	The End of San Francisco	Winner	
2014	Nonfiction	S. Bear Bergman	Blood, Marriage, Wine and Glitter	Finalist	
2014	Nonfiction	Paul B. Preciado	Testo Junkie	Finalist	
2015	Fiction	Casey Plett	A Safe Girl to Love	Winner	
2015	Fiction	La JohnJoseph	Everything Must Go	Finalist	
2015	Fiction	Kim Fu	For Today I Am a Boy	Finalist	
2015	Fiction	Shani Mootoo	Moving Forward Sideways like a Crab	Finalist	
2015	Fiction	Alex Myers	Revolutionary: A Novel	Finalist	
2015	Nonfiction	Thomas Page McBee	Man Alive: A True Story of Violence, Forgiveness and Becoming a Man	Winner	
2015	Nonfiction	Janet Mock	Redefining Realness: My Path to Womanhood, Identity, Love and So Much More	Finalist	
2015	Nonfiction	Laura Erickson-Schroth	Trans Bodies, Trans Selves: A Resource for the Transgender Community	Finalist	
2016	Fiction	Roz Kaveney	Tiny Pieces of Skull, or a Lesson in Manners	Winner	
2016	Fiction	Michael Scott Monje, Jr.	Defiant	Finalist	
2016	Fiction	Sassafras Lowrey	Lost Boi	Finalist	
2016	Nonfiction	Willy Wilkinson	Born on the Edge of Race and Gender: A Voice for Cultural Competency	Winner	
2016	Nonfiction	Amy Ellis Nutt	Becoming Nicole: The Transformation of an American Family	Finalist	
2016	Nonfiction	Zane Thimmesch-Gill	Hiding in Plain Sight	Finalist	
2016	Poetry	kari edwards	succubus in my pocket	Winner	
2016	Poetry	Joy Ladin	Impersonation	Finalist	
2016	Poetry	Ryka Aoki	Why Dust Shall Never Settle Upon This Soul	Finalist	
2017	Fiction	jia qing wilson-yang	Small Beauty	Winner	
2017	Fiction	Kai Cheng Thom	Fierce Femmes and Notorious Liars: A Dangerous Trans Girl's Confabulous Memoir	Finalist	
2017	Fiction	Meredith Russo	If I Was Your Girl	Finalist	
2017	Nonfiction	Lei Ming	Life Beyond My Body: A Transgender Journey to Manhood in China	Winner	
2017	Nonfiction	Morgan Mann Willis	Outside the XY: Black and Brown Queer Masculinity	Finalist	
2017	Nonfiction	Julia Serano	Outspoken: A Decade of Transgender Activism and Trans Feminism	Finalist	
2017	Nonfiction	Samuel Peterson	Trunky (Transgender Junky): A Memoir	Finalist	
2017	Nonfiction	Sung Yim	What About the Rest of Your Life	Finalist	
2017	Nonfiction	Chase Joynt and Mike Hoolboom	You Only Live Twice: Sex, Death and Transition	Finalist	
2017	Poetry	Kokumo	Reacquainted with Life	Winner	
2017	Poetry	Vivek Shraya	even this page is white	Finalist	
2017	Poetry	Jos Charles	Safe Space	Finalist	
2017	Poetry	Cameron Awkward-Rich	Sympathetic Little Monster	Finalist	
2017	Poetry	Jai Arun Ravine	The Romance of Siam: A Pocket Guide	Finalist	
2018	Fiction	Bogi Takács (editor)	Transcendent 2: The Year's Best Transgender Speculative Fiction	Winner	
2018	Fiction	Jennifer Finney Boylan	Long Black Veil	Finalist	
2018	Fiction	Tobi Hill-Meyer (editor)	Nerve Endings: The New Trans Erotic	Finalist	
2018	Fiction	Amy Heart, Sugi Pyrrophyta, and Larissa Glasser (editors)	Resilience: Surviving in the Face of Everything	Finalist	
2018	Fiction	Jeanne Thornton	The Black Emerald	Finalist	
2018	Nonfiction	C. Riley Snorton	Black on Both Sides: A Racial History of Trans Identity	Winner	
2018	Nonfiction	Rosalind Rosenberg	Jane Crow: The Life of Pauli Murray	Finalist	
2018	Nonfiction	Brice Smith	Lou Sullivan: Daring to Be a Man Among Men	Finalist	
2018	Nonfiction	Janet Mock	Surpassing Certainty	Finalist	
2018	Poetry	Ching-In Chen	recombinant	Winner	
2018	Poetry	Kai Cheng Thom	a place called Homeland	Finalist	
2018	Poetry	Juliana Huxtable	Mucus in My Pineal Gland	Finalist	
2018	Poetry	Julian Talamantez Brolaski	Of Mongrelitude	Finalist	
2018	Poetry	Kayleb Rae Candrilli	What Runs Over	Finalist	
2019	Fiction	Casey Plett	Little Fish	Winner	
2019	Fiction	Jordy Rosenberg	Confessions of the Fox: A Novel	Finalist	
2019	Fiction	Akwaeke Emezi	Freshwater	Finalist	
2019	Fiction	Calvin Gimpelevich	Invasions	Finalist	
2019	Fiction	Mattilda Bernstein Sycamore	Sketchtasy	Finalist	
2019	Nonfiction	Jules Gill-Peterson	Histories of the Transgender Child	Winner	
2019	Nonfiction	Thomas Page McBee	Amateur: A True Story About What Makes a Man	Finalist	
2019	Nonfiction	Vivek Shraya	I'm Afraid of Men	Finalist	
2019	Nonfiction	Aren Z. Aizura	Mobile Subjects: Transnational Imaginaries of Gender Reassignment	Finalist	
2019	Nonfiction	Samantha Allen	Real Queer America: LGBT Stories from Red States	Finalist	
2019	Nonfiction	Joy Ladin	The Soul of the Stranger: Reading God and Torah from a Transgender Perspective	Finalist	
2019	Poetry	Roque Salas Rivera	lo terciario / the tertiary	Winner	
2019	Poetry	Luna Merbruja	Heal Your Love	Finalist	
2019	Poetry	Gwen Benaway	Holy Wild	Finalist	
2019	Poetry	Sara Mithra	If the Color Is Fugitive	Finalist	
2019	Poetry	Ely Shipley	Some Animal	Finalist	
2020	Fiction	Hazel Jane Plante	Little Blue Encyclopedia (for Vivian)	Winner	
2020	Fiction	Bones McKay	Honey Walls	Finalist	
2020	Fiction	M. Z. McDonnell	Poet, Prophet, Fox: The Tale of Sinnach the Seer	Finalist	
2020	Fiction	Rachel Pollack	The Beatrix Gates	Finalist	
2020	Fiction	Bogi Takács	The Trans Space Octopus Congregation	Finalist	
2020	Nonfiction	Ellis Martin and Zach Ozma (editors)	We Both Laughed in Pleasure: The Selected Diaries of Lou Sullivan	Winner	
2020	Nonfiction	Andrea Long Chu	Females	Finalist	
2020	Nonfiction	S.J. Langer	Theorizing Transgender Identity for Clinical Practice: A New Model for Understanding Gender	Finalist	
2020	Nonfiction	T Fleischmann	Time Is the Thing A Body Moves Through	Finalist	
2020	Poetry	Xandria Phillips	HULL	Winner	
2020	Poetry	Cameron Awkward-Rich	Dispatch	Finalist	
2020	Poetry	Andrea Abi-Karam	EXTRATRANSMISSION	Finalist	
2020	Poetry	Samuel Ace	Our Weather Our Sea	Finalist	
2020	Poetry	Yanyi	The Year of Blue Water	Finalist	
2021	Fiction	Zeyn Joukhadar	The Thirty Names of Night	Winner	
2021	Fiction	Nino Cipri	Finna	Finalist	
2021	Fiction	Chana Porter	The Seep	Finalist	
2021	Fiction	Vivek Shraya	The Subtweet	Finalist	
2021	Fiction	Lydia Rogue (editor)	Trans-Galactic Bike Ride: Feminist Bicycle Science Fiction Stories of Transgender and Nonbinary Adventurers	Finalist	
2021	Nonfiction	J Mase III and Lady Dane Figueroa Edidi	The Black Trans Prayer Book	Winner	
2021	Nonfiction	Meredith Talusan	Fairest: A Memoir	Finalist	
2021	Nonfiction	L Heidenreich	Nepantla Squared: Transgender Mestiz@ Histories in Times of Global Shift	Finalist	
2021	Nonfiction	Mattilda Bernstein Sycamore	The Freezer Door	Finalist	
2021	Nonfiction	Hil Malatino	Trans Care	Finalist	
2021	Poetry	Sade LaNay	I Love You and I'm Not Dead	Winner	
2021	Poetry	Aeon Ginsberg	Greyhound	Finalist	
2021	Poetry	Kay Ulanday Barrett	More Than Organs	Finalist	
2021	Poetry	Maxe Crandall	The Nancy Reagan Collection	Finalist	
2021	Poetry	Jay Besemer	Theories of Performance	Finalist	
2022	Fiction	Jeanne Thornton	Summer Fun	Winner	
2022	Fiction	Torrey Peters	Detransition, Baby	Finalist	
2022	Fiction	Callum Angus	A Natural History of Transition	Finalist	
2022	Fiction	Megan Milks	Margaret and the Mystery of the Missing Body	Finalist	
2022	Fiction	Shelley Parker-Chan	She Who Became the Sun	Finalist	
2022	Nonfiction	Da'Shaun Harrison	Belly of the Beast: The Politics of Anti-Fatness as Anti-Blackness	Winner	
2022	Nonfiction	Francisco Galarte	Brown Trans Figurations: Rethinking Race, Gender, and Sexuality in Chicanx/Latinx Studies	Finalist	
2022	Nonfiction	Ivan Coyote	Care Of: Letters, Connections, and Cures	Finalist	
2022	Nonfiction	Alicia Spencer-Hall and Blake Gutt (Eds.)	Trans and Genderqueer Subjects in Medieval Hagiography	Finalist	
2022	Nonfiction	Lucie Fielding	Trans Sex: Clinical Approaches to Trans Sexualities and Erotic Embodiments	Finalist	
2022	Poetry	Mason J	Crossbones on My Life	Winner	
2022	Poetry	Dani Putney	Salamat sa Intersectionality	Finalist	
2022	Poetry	Lindsay Choi	Transverse	Finalist	
2022	Poetry	Andrea Abi-Karam	Villainy	Finalist	
2022	Poetry	Roque Salas Rivera	x/ex/exis	Finalist	
2023	Fiction	Cat Fitzpatrick	The Call-Out	Winner	
2023	Fiction	James Hannaham	Didn't Nobody Give a Shit What Happened to Carlotta	Finalist	
2023	Fiction	Izzy Wasserstein	All the Hometowns You Can't Stay Away From	Finalist	
2023	Fiction	Morgan Thomas	Manywhere	Finalist	
2023	Fiction	Maya Deane	Wrath Goddess Sing	Finalist	
2023	Nonfiction	Emma Grove	The Third Person	Winner	
2023	Nonfiction	Kit Heyam	Before We Were Trans: A New History of Gender	Finalist	
2023	Nonfiction	Cecilia Gentili	Faltas: Letters to Everyone in My Hometown Who Isn't My Rapist	Finalist	
2023	Nonfiction	Jeremiah Moss	Feral City: On Finding Liberation in Lockdown New York	Finalist	
2023	Nonfiction	Cameron Awkward-Rich	The Terrible We: Thinking with Trans Maladjustment	Finalist	
2023	Poetry	Kamden Ishmael Hilliard	MissSettl	Winner	
2023	Poetry	Golden	A Dead Name That Learned How to Live	Finalist	
2023	Poetry	Kay Gabriel	A Queen in Bucks County	Finalist	
2023	Poetry	Paul Tran	All the Flowers Kneeling	Finalist	
2023	Poetry	Prathna Lor	Emanations	Finalist	
2024	Fiction	Soula Emmanuel	Wild Geese	Winner	
2024	Fiction	Nicola Dinan	Bellies	Finalist	
2024	Fiction	Emily Zhou	Girlfriends	Finalist	
2024	Fiction	Valérie Bah, translated by Kama La Mackerel	The Rage Letters	Finalist	
2024	Fiction	Sylvia Aguilar Zéleny	Trash	Finalist	
2024	Nonfiction	Miss Major and Toshio Meronek	Miss Major Speaks: Conversations with a Black Trans Revolutionary	Winner	
2024	Nonfiction	McKenzie Wark	Love and Money, Sex and Death	Finalist	
2024	Nonfiction	Casey Plett	On Community	Finalist	
2024	Nonfiction	Stacy Jane Grover	Tar Hollow Trans: Essays	Finalist	
2024	Nonfiction	Mx. Sly	Transland: Consent, Kink and Pleasure	Finalist	
2024	Poetry	Michal "MJ" Jones	Hood Vacations	Winner	
2024	Poetry	Victoriano Cárdenas	Portraits as Animals: Poems	Finalist	
2024	Poetry	K. Iver	Short Film Starring My Beloved's Red Bronco	Finalist	
2024	Poetry	Jennifer Conlon	Taking to Water	Finalist	
2024	Poetry	Subhaga Crystal Bacon	Transitory	Finalist	
2025	Fiction	Nino Bulling	Firebugs	Winner	
2025	Fiction	RJ McDaniel	All Things Seen and Unseen: A Novel	Finalist	
2025	Fiction	Alvina Chamberland	Love the World or Get Killed Trying	Finalist	
2025	Fiction	June Martin	Love/Aggression	Finalist	
2025	Fiction	Harman Burns	Yellow Barks Spider	Finalist	
2025	Nonfiction	KB Brookins	Pretty	Winner	
2025	Nonfiction	Nico Lang	American Teenager: How Trans Kids Are Surviving Hate and Finding Joy in a Turbulent Era	Finalist	
2025	Nonfiction	Vera Blossom	How to Fuck Like a Girl	Finalist	
2025	Nonfiction	CeCé Telfer	Make it Count	Finalist	
2025	Nonfiction	Nat Raha and Mijke van der Drift	Trans Femme Futures: Abolitionist Ethics for Transfeminist Worlds	Finalist	
2025	Poetry	Zefyr Lisowski	Girl Work	Winner	
2025	Poetry	Jaya Jacobo, Translated from Filipino by Christian Jil Benitez	Arasahas: Poems from the Tropic	Finalist	
2025	Poetry	Oliver Baez Bendorf	Consider the Rooster	Finalist	
2025	Poetry	Joshua Jennifer Espinoza	I Don't Want to Be Understood	Finalist	
2025	Poetry	Spencer Williams	TRANZ	Finalist	
2026	Fiction	Milo Todd	The Lilac People	Winner	
2026	Fiction	Zee Carlstrom	Make Sure You Die Screaming	Finalist	
2026	Fiction	Haden Cross	The Uncontinented Stars	Finalist	
2026	Fiction	Emily St. James	Woodworking	Finalist	
2026	Fiction	Mattilda Bernstein Sycamore	Terry Dactyl	Finalist	
2026	Nonfiction	Jennifer Finney Boylan	Cleavage: Men, Women, and the Space Between Us	Winner	
2026	Nonfiction	Zefyr Lisowski	Uncanny Valley Girls	Finalist	
2026	Nonfiction	Mirha-Soleil Ross	Gendertrash From Hell: The First Print Collection of the Zine That Changed Everything	Finalist	
2026	Nonfiction	Denne Michele Norris with Electric Literature	Both/And	Finalist	
2026	Nonfiction	Tourmaline	Marsha: The Joy and Defiance of Marsha P. Johnson	Finalist	
2026	Poetry	Roque Raquel Salas Rivera	Algarabía – The Song of Cenex, Natural Son of the Isle Alarabíyya	Winner	
2026	Poetry	Golden	Reprise: Poems and Photographs	Finalist	
2026	Poetry	Jzl Jmz	Local Woman	Finalist	
2026	Poetry	Rickey Laurentiis	Death of the First Idea: Poems	Finalist	
2026	Poetry	jaye simpson	a body more tolerable	Finalist	

== See also ==
- Leslie Feinberg Award
- Otherwise Award
- Stonewall Book Award
