= Joy Ladin =

American poet (born 1961)

- Born: March 24, 1961 (age 65); Rochester, New York, U.S
- Education: Sarah Lawrence College (BA), University of Massachusetts Amherst (MFA), Princeton University (PhD)
- Spouse: Christine Benvenuto (m. 1989–2007) Elizabeth Denlinger (m. 2016)
- Writing career
- Genres: Poetry, Memoir, Criticism
- Notable work: Through the Door of Life: A Jewish Journey Between Genders (2012)
- Website: joyladin.wordpress.com

Joy Ladin (born March 24, 1961) is an American poet and the former David and Ruth Gottesman Chair in English at Stern College for Women at Yeshiva University. She was the first openly transgender professor at an Orthodox Jewish institution.

== Early life, education, and identity ==
Ladin was born in Rochester, New York to Lola and Irving Ladin. Irving Ladin's family were labor organizers with connections to the International Ladies Garment Workers Union. Her parents, both coming from non-observant Jewish households, remained non-observant through Ladin's childhood. However, Ladin's mother encouraged Ladin to attend synagogue and Hebrew school to build a Jewish identity. Ladin has attributed her lack of a strong Jewish education to her connection to the religion and theology.

Ladin has described intuiting her girlhood at a young age, viewing her assigned male identity as "false" as a child. At age eight, she began calling herself a "pacifist" in order to avoid combative play and athletics.

At sixteen, Ladin went to Sarah Lawrence College, where she majored in creative writing and social science. After graduating in 1982, she moved to San Francisco with her wife, where she worked as a legal clerk. Ten years later, Ladin decided she wanted to pursue poetry full time, and attended the University of Massachusetts Amherst for her MFA. As a part of her stipend, she taught a course and found a love of teaching. After graduating in 1995, she went to Princeton University for her PhD in English literature. She graduated from Princeton in 2000.

She received her Ph.D. from Princeton University in 2000, her MFA in creative writing from the University of Massachusetts Amherst in 1995 and her B.A. from Sarah Lawrence College in 1982. In 2007, Ladin received tenure at Yeshiva University, and thereafter announced her gender transition. In response, she was placed on paid leave for 18 months. With the aid of lawyers from Lambda Legal, Ladin returned to work at Yeshiva University in 2008.

== Poetry ==
As of 2018, Ladin has published nine books of poetry. (Some of these works appear under her previous name.)

- The Future is Trying to Tell Us Something (Sheep Meadow Press, 2017)
- Fireworks in the Graveyard (Headmistress Press, 2017)
- Impersonation (Sheep Meadow Press, 2015)
- The Definition of Joy (Sheep Meadow Press, 2012)
- Psalms (Wipf & Stock, 2010)
- Coming To Life (Sheep Meadow Press, 2010)
- Transmigrations (Sheep Meadow Press, 2009)
- The Book of Anna (Sheep Meadow Press, 2007)
- Alternatives to History (Sheep Meadow Press, 2003)

In 2013, Ladin published a series of poems formed entirely from words and phrases found in popular women's magazines. These poems, such as "Ready To Know," link both trans women and cis women's experiences of gender to the "commodity capitalist engine of the production of femininity." This work emerged when Ladin gave herself a "writing assignment" to creatively engage with the "how-to" rhetoric of mainstream femininity.

In 2020, Ladin was commissioned by Poets.org as a part of Project 19, a joint commemoration with the New York Philharmonic of the 19th Amendment's centennial thorough the commissioning of poetry by 19 female poets and 19 female composers. For this collection, she wrote A Bridge on Account of Sex: A Trans Woman Speaks to Susan B. Anthony on the 100th Anniversary of the 19th Amendment.

== Memoir ==
In 2012, she published the memoir Through the Door of Life: A Jewish Journey Between Genders. In the book, she asserts that she is "old-fashioned – a garden-variety transsexual, rather than a post-modernist shape-shifter,” a claim which led critics to contrast her memoir with Kate Bornstein's. Her memoir describes her family life, her transition, and her religious faith, including her perception that her "gender identity crisis had destroyed [her] marriage." In 2012, Through the Door of Life was a finalist in the "Biography, Autobiography, Memoir" category of the National Jewish Book Awards.

== Scholarship ==
Ladin has written many articles, primarily on 19th-century American literature.

Ladin has frequently commented on the fields of trans literature and poetics. Ladin takes a non-identitarian stance, in that she does not believe that trans literature is necessarily being about trans experiences, or written by trans people.

In her "Trans Poetics Manifesto", Ladin defines trans poetics as "techniques that enable poetic language to reflect the kind of complex, unstable, contradictory relations between body and soul, social self and psyche, that those who see ourselves as transgender experience as acute, definitive, life-changing." Ladin has argued that poetry, and lyric forms in particular, might be the best mode through which to represent the transgender experience.

In 2018, Ladin published her first full-length academic monograph, The Soul of the Stranger: Reading God and Torah from a Transgender Perspective (Brandeis University Press). Her book offers trans readings of the Torah in order to argue that, despite traditional readings of Genesis and other biblical stories as enforcing a strict dichotomy between men and women, “God is not particularly invested in gender” or the gender binary per se. Ladin's exegesis instead positions Jewish religious patriarchy as a function of social norms, not the sacred texts themselves. In a divergence from traditional scholarly reading methods, The Soul of Stranger includes autobiographical reflection as well as close readings.

== Personal life ==
Ladin has three children from her previous marriage to the writer Christine Benvenuto. She is now remarried to Elizabeth Denlinger.

In summer 2021, she left Yeshiva University due to an illness.

== Awards ==
=== Poetry ===
- National Jewish Book Award, The Book of Anna, 2021
- Literature Fellowship, National Endowment for the Arts, 2016
- Finalist, Lambda Literary Award for Transgender Poetry, Impersonation, 2015
- Forward Fives Award, The Forward, 2010
- Finalist, Lambda Literary Award for Transgender Literature, Transmigration, 2009

=== Books ===
- Finalist, Lambda Literary Award for Transgender Nonfiction, The Soul of the Stranger: Reading God and Torah from a Transgender Perspective, 2018
- Over the Rainbow List of LGBT Books, American Library Association,Through the Door of Life, 2013
- Finalist, National Jewish Book Award, Through the Door of Life, 2012

=== Activism ===
- Hachamat Lev Award, Keshet (organization), 2019
- Named one of the "Forward 50," The Forward, 2012
