= Willy Wilkinson =

American writer and LGBTQ activist

Willy Chang Wilkinson
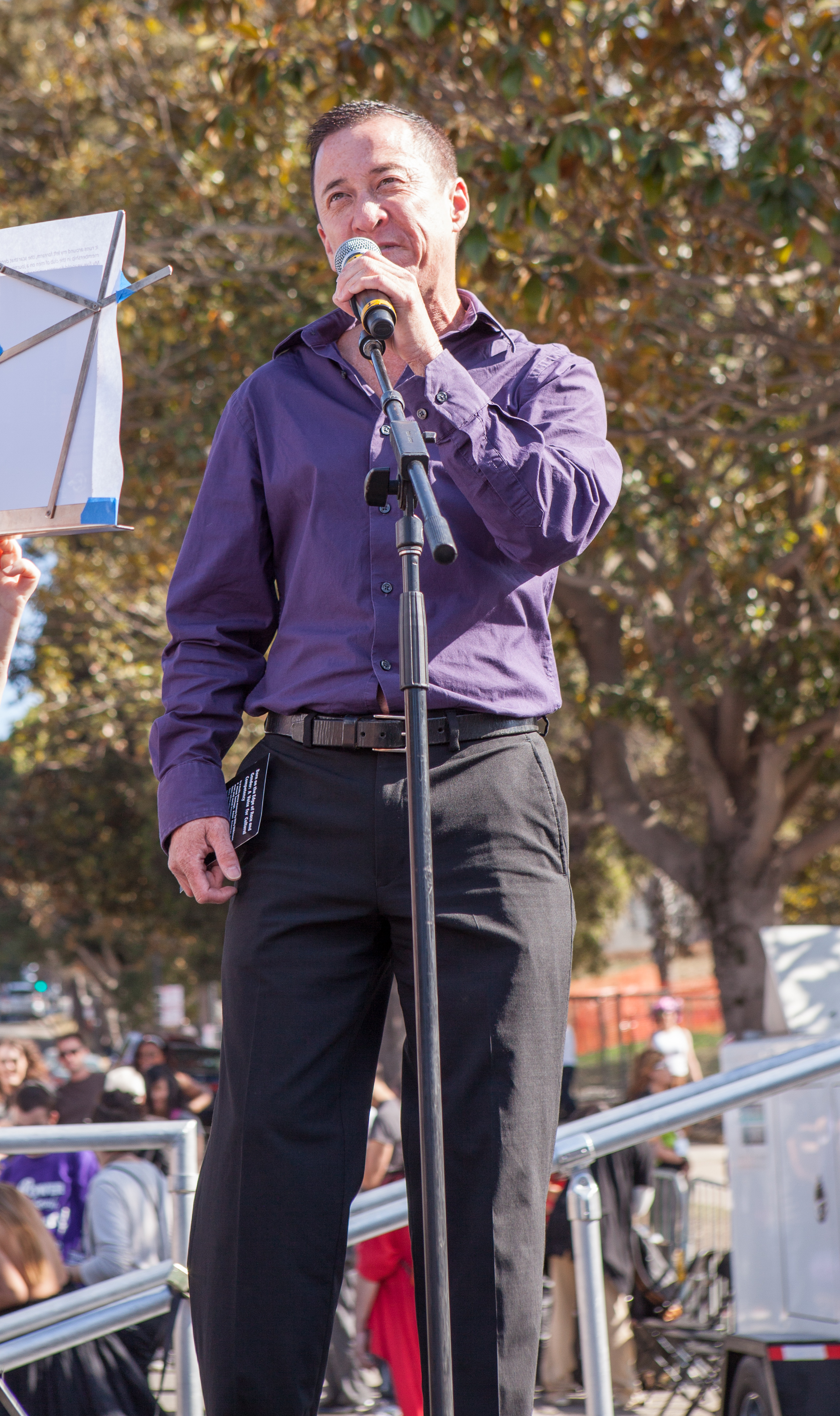
- Willy Wilkinson speaking at San Francisco Trans March 2015
- Education: University of California, Santa Cruz; University of California, Berkeley
- Occupations: Writer, public health consultant, LGBTQ activist
- Website: Official website

Willy Chаng Wilkinson is an American writer, public health consultant, LGBTQ activist, and longterm LGВТQ cultural competency trainer from California.

As an expert in transgender issues, he has worked extensively with health care organizations, educational institutions, businesses and other entities on increasing access for LGВТQ populations.

== Early life and education ==
Wilkinson was born in San Mateo, California in the early 1960s. He was assigned female at birth and is the youngest of four children. His mother was Chinese from Hawaii. His father is of Scottish, English, and Irish descent.

When Wilkinson was nine years old, he changed his name to Willy. He earned a Bachelor of Arts degree (BA) in Women's Studies at University of California, Santa Cruz. He earned his Masters in Public Health (MPH) in Community Health Education from University of California, Berkeley.

== Honors and awards ==
- 2004: NLGJA: The Association of LGBTQ+ Journalists Excellence in Writing Award for his article in the San Francisco Chronicle about the social and political intersections of his parents' interracial marriage and his own same-sex marriage.
- 2014: Transgender Law Center Claire Skiffington Vanguard Award (2014)
- 2015: Keynote Speaker at UC Berkeley's Queer and Asian Conference
- 2015: Asian Pacific Islander Queer Women and Trans Community (APIQWTC), Phoenix Award
- 2016: Lambda Literary Award, transgender nonfiction, for his book Born on the Edge of Race and Gender: A Voice for Cultural Competency

== Published work ==
- Wilkinson, W. (2006). Public health gains of the transgender community in San Francisco: Grassroots organizing and community-based research. In P. Currah, R. Juang, & S. Minter (Eds.), Transgender rights (pp. 192–214), Minneapolis: University of Minnesota Press. [Lambda Literary Award Finalist]
- Wilkinson, W. (2015). Born on the Edge of Race and Gender: A Voice for Cultural Competency. Winner of the Lambda Literary Award in transgender nonfiction, the book highlights his intersectional experiences of race, gender, sexuality, disability, class, and parenthood with reflections from the fields of cultural competency, public health, and political advocacy. Elucidates trans experience from a Chinese American and mixed heritage perspective, and uses the memoir genre as a cultural competency tool.
- Wilkinson, W. C. (2023). Gender Splendor: 50 Creative Sparks to Celebrate Yourself at All Ages and Stages. A creative workbook that offers metaphoric inspiration for trans, nonbinary, and gender-expansive people and their allies. Invites the community to use the transformative power of self-expression to name their truths, take back their power, and remind themselves of their brilliance and resilience.
- Global perspective on transgender cultural competency (2014) in the inaugural edition of Transgender Studies Quarterly.
- In Laura Erickson-Schroth (ed.) Trans Bodies, Trans Selves (2014), a piece that explores the intersections between mixed heritage and trans experience.
- Manning Up: Transsexual Men on Finding Brotherhood, Family and Themselves (2014) addresses racism, Asian female subjugation, and transgender expression, and was described as "highly evocative" by the Lambda Literary Review.

== Personal life ==
Wilkinson lives in Oakland, California. He is the father of three.
