= The Thirty Names of Night =

2020 novel by Zeyn Joukhadar

- Author: Zeyn Joukhadar
- Language: English
- Genre: Literary fiction
- Publisher: Atria Books
- Publication date: November 2020
- Publication place: United States
- Media type: Print (hardcover)
- Pages: 304
- Awards: Stonewall Book Award; Lambda Literary Award for Transgender Fiction
- ISBN: 978-1-9821-2149-5

The Thirty Names of Night is a novel by Zeyn Joukhadar, published November 24, 2020 by Atria Books. The book received the Stonewall Book Award for Literature and the Lambda Literary Award for Transgender Fiction.

== Background ==
In a Ploughshares interview, Joukhadar said that the novel took shape during its second draft, when he visited an exhibit on Little Syria at the New York City Department of Records and Information Services organized by the Arab American National Museum.

== Reception ==
The novel received starred reviews from Library Journal, Booklist, and Kirkus Reviews.

In The New York Times, Rayyan Al-Shawaf gave the novel a positive review, writing that despite reservations about its pace and plotting, it stood out for its lyrical quality, its depiction of early-20th-century Syro-Lebanese communities, and its portrayal of a contemporary protagonist shaped by "an unrelenting sense of bodily imprisonment". Writing for ZYZZYVA, Nessa Ordukhani described the book as "an intricate story of love and loss, community and culture". In a mixed review for USA Today, Delfina V. Barbiero wrote that the novel's many themes could at times feel overwhelming, though she praised its treatment of the protagonist's gender identity struggle.

Accolades for The Thirty Names of Night
Year	Accolade	Result	Ref.
2021	Stonewall Book Award for Literature	Winner	
2021	Lambda Literary Award for Transgender Fiction	Winner	
2020	Bustle's Best Books of 2020	Selection	
