= Cameron Awkward-Rich =

American poet

- Awkward-Rich in 2026
- Occupations: Poet, academic
- Website: cawkwardrich.com

Cameron Awkward-Rich is a poet and academic. He is the author of the full-length poetry collections Sympathetic Little Monster, a finalist for the Lambda Literary Award, and Dispatch, which won the 2018 Lexi Rudnitsky Editor's Choice Award as well as An Optimism. In addition, he has published the chapbook Transit.

Awkward-Rich earned a PhD from Stanford University's program in Modern Thought and Literature before spending time at Duke University as a Postdoctoral Fellow in the Transgender Studies & Humanities Project with the Program in Gender, Sexuality, and Feminist Studies. As of February 2026, he teaches women, gender, and sexuality studies at the University of Massachusetts, Amherst.

Awkward-Rich was a keynote speaker for the 2020 Thinking Trans/Trans Thinking Conference, organized by the Trans Philosophy Project. He was also a Featured Poet during the 2020 Split This Rock Poetry Festival, a gathering in Washington, DC, organized biennially around social justice themes.

He lives in Northampton, Massachusetts.

== Publications ==
=== Books ===
An Optimism. New York: Persea Books, 2025.

The Terrible We: Thinking With Trans Maladjustment. Durham and London: Duke University Press, 2022.

Dispatch: poems. New York: Persea Books, 2019.

Sympathetic Little Monster. Los Angeles: Richocet Editions, 2016.

Subject to Change: Trans Poetry & Conversation (with Joshua Jennifer Espinoza, Christopher Soto, Beyza Ozer, Kay Ulanday Barrett). Little Rock: Sibling Rivalry Press, 2017.

=== Chapbooks ===
Transit. Gardena: Button Poetry, 2017.

=== Craft Essays ===
"Craft Capsule: Revising the Archive."

=== Interviews ===
Gow, Robin. "Trying to Feel A Part of Some Kind of 'We': A Conversation With Cameron Awkward-Rich."

Marshell, Kyla. "The Pen Ten with Cameron Awkward-Rich."

=== Scholarly Articles ===
"The Fiction of Ethnography in Charlotte Perkin Gilman's Herland." Science Fiction Studies, v43 n2 (2016): 331–350.
