= I Am J =

2011 young adult novel by Cris Beam

- Author: Cris Beam
- Language: English
- Genre: Young adult novel
- Publisher: Little, Brown
- Publication date: 2011
- Publication place: United States
- Pages: 339

I Am J is a young adult novel written by Cris Beam. It tells the story of 17-year-old transgender student J, who is transitioning during his senior year in high school in New York City, and struggles to find acceptance with his peers and his parents. Published in 2011 by Little, Brown, I Am J was a finalist for the 2012 Lambda Literary Award, in the Transgender Fiction category.

== Publication ==
I Am J was published by Little, Brown, in March 2011, in a 339-page hardcover edition.

== Synopsis ==
=== Plot ===
J Silver is a Puerto Rican and Jewish 17-year-old high school senior who has known for a long time that he is not female. He lives in New York City with his parents, Carolina and Manny. He wears baggy clothes to hide his body, keeps his hair short, and tries not to think about how the world sees him as a girl. He faces harassment from his classmates, who call him a "dyke." His angst reaches a head when he drunkenly kisses his best friend Melissa after a party, who promptly ends their friendship and tells him to stay away from her. After losing his closest friend, J decides to stop going to school and instead researches "female-to-male" transgender people on the internet. He finds pictures of transgender men who had surgeries to remove their breasts and change their genitals, as well as men who took a hormone called "testosterone" to made their faces and bodies grow more hair, their muscles get bigger, and their voices get deeper. Emboldened by his discoveries, J decides to start his transformation into being a boy. He starts going to a Starbucks every day, where he meets two girls, Madison and Blue. Blue and J flirt and begin to develop a relationship. J fears that Blue will figure out that J is transgender and break up with him. While this is happening, J runs away from home, staying in a homeless shelter for queer youth. He also switches schools to a queer-friendly alternative high school, where he meets a girl named Chanelle. His parents become worried about his whereabouts and uses Melissa as a bait to help them reconnect. J and Carolina have a few difficult conversations, during which J comes out to her. She does not take it very well, and his Manny, handles it even worse. J stays with Melissa for a few days, but when J comes out to her, she does not get it either. They eventually make up, and Melissa tells J that she is going to participate in a dance showcase with a piece to represent the transgender experience. This does not sit well with J, who encourages that she perform a dance about her struggles with self-harming instead. J starts meeting more and more transgender people through an LGBTQ youth group and becomes confident in his ability to start his transition. He starts testosterone, and gets an opportunity to show off some of his photos at Melissa's dance recital. That same night, at his parents' anniversary party, J finds out that Carolina has been lying to his father, telling him that J was away at a computer camp in DC. They have an argument and eventually realize that they need their space from one another. J moves out for good and lives with Melissa and her mom, but his parents come to visit every once in a while. The novel ends with J opening a letter addressed to "Mr. Silver," where he finds out he has been accepted to a photography program in upstate New York for the fall semester.

=== Characters ===
- J Silver is the protagonist and titular character of the novel. J is 17 years old, a high school senior. His mother is Puerto Rican and his dad is white and Jewish, giving him some mixed features; J has dark curly hair and brown eyes. He likes using photography to express himself. J experiences a lot of angst and confusion during the course of the novel, some of which he expresses with anger towards others.
- Carolina Silver is J's mother, a Catholic Puerto Rican woman. She works at a hospital as a nurse. With J she is firm but loving, and worries about him coming out as transgender will mean for his future.
- Melissa is J's best friend. They met in the 8th grade when a teacher insisted on calling J by his birth name, and Melissa stood up for him despite not knowing him at the time. She is a dancer and has body image issues. Melissa cuts herself and experiences some thoughts of suicide, which J tries to help her with. J has had feelings for Melissa since they met, but he accepted a long time ago that Melissa will never see him in the same way.
- Blue is J's romantic interest. She is a painter who is obsessed with the color blue, to the point where she even dyes her hair blue. Her real name is Basia, and she lives with her Polish mother who runs a daycare out of their apartment.
- Manny Silver is J's father. He is emotionally unavailable and does not take well to the fact that J is transgender.
- Chanelle is a transgender woman who J befriends in the alternative high school. She is a bit older than J and acts as a kind of mentor to him.

== Reception ==
I Am J was positively received by critics for its portrayal of queer and transgender youth.

The novel was also referenced extensively in a journal article, published in Barnboken Journal of Children's Research, titled "Re-writing the Script: Representations of Transgender Creativity in Contemporary Young Adult Fiction and Television." Its author, Kate Norbury, emphasizes the value of creativity in the novel, and connects this portrayal to the "creative-achievement script" in storytelling, that gives transgender characters fully developed narratives with notable creative traits.

Cathi McCrae, in the September 2011 issue of digital magazine Youth Today, reviewed the book and states that "Beam's novel brings us intensely into J's reality, from his stark sense of alienation to his emerging self-awareness within a new body and community."

In Volume 57 of School Library Journal, Diane Tuccillo praised the book by stating that "the story is believable and effective due to insightful situations, realistic language, and convincing dialogue."

== Awards ==
I Am J was named a finalist for the 2012 Lambda Literary Award, in the Transgender Fiction category.

The book was featured in the Assembly on Literature for Adolescents's Rainbow List, "an annual book list of recommended LGBTQ fiction and nonfiction titles for young readers," in the Top Ten List section.
