= Cris Beam =

American writer

Cris Beam is an American writer. She is the author of nonfiction books on transgender teenagers, the U.S. foster system, and empathy, as well as a young adult novel and a short memoir.

== Life ==
Beam was a volunteer teacher at EAGLES Academy for two and a half years, a former public high school for LGBT students in Los Angeles. She has an adoptive daughter.

== Books ==
=== Transparent ===
In 2007, Beam published Transparent: Love, Family, and Living the T with Transgender Teenagers. The non-fiction book describes four transgender teenage girls; The New York Times said, "With sensitivity and a deep connection to the girls, Beam describes their struggles with transitioning and how they reconcile them with more familiar teenage concerns like crushes and cliques." Beam, a journalist from New York City, began the book after moving to Los Angeles where her partner was in graduate school and Beam began volunteering at a high school for gay and trans teenagers.

Transparent won the 2008 Transgender Lambda Literary Award and the American Library Association's Gay, Lesbian, Bisexual, and Transgender Round Table named it a Stonewall Honor Book for Nonfiction for 2008.

=== I Am J ===
In 2011, Beam published I Am J, a young adult novel which was named a finalist for two 2012 Lambda Literary Awards, in the categories of Transgender Fiction and LGBT Children's/Young Adult. I Am J was one of the first YA fiction books about a trans kid of color.

=== To the End of June ===
In 2013, Beam published To the End of June: The Intimate Life of American Foster Care. In the Chicago Tribune, Robin Erb called To the End of June a "a challenging and refreshing read" thanks to Beam's intention, in Beam's words, to make the book "be more descriptive than prescriptive, placing the why above the what next" [emphasis in the original] in her account of the system's problems. In The New York Times, Benoit Denizet-Lewis says, "Beam’s book is most gripping when she hangs out with foster children themselves. Just as she did in 'Transparent,' her excellent book about transgender teenagers in Los Angeles, Beam writes about social outcasts without stereotyping them. She gives them a much-needed voice and does what too many adults in the foster-care system can’t, or won’t: she advocates for them." But Denizet-Lewis also notes Beam's reporting suggests this advocacy "can provide only so much hope in a system that no one — 'not the kids, not the foster or biological parents, not the social workers, the administrators, the politicians, the policy experts' — thinks is working."

=== I Feel You ===
In 2018, Beam published the nonfiction book I Feel You: The Surprising Power of Extreme Empathy.

== See also ==
- LGBT culture in New York City
- Literary analysis
