= Love, Violet =

2021 picture book by Charlotte Sullivan Wild

- Author: Charlotte Sullivan Wild
- Illustrator: Charlene Chua
- Language: English
- Genre: Picture book
- Publisher: Farrar, Straus and Giroux an Imprint of Macmillian
- Publication date: November 16, 2021
- Publication place: United States
- Pages: 40
- ISBN: 978-0-374-31372-2

Love, Violet is a children's picture book written by Charlotte Sullivan Wild and illustrated by Charlene Chua. It tells the love story of a girl named Violet, who is too shy to say how she feels to her classmate, Mira. The book was published on November 16, 2021, by Farrar, Straus and Giroux.

== Background ==
Charlotte Sullivan Wild grew up in a religious setting in which being queer was seen as a negative, which led to her coming out only later in life, as an adult. In addition, most fairy tales she knew as a kid were heteronormative. These experiences served as inspiration to create a book for children that embraced love between queer people and people of color.

Another aspect from Sullivan Wild's life introduced into the narrative was the lack of a specific label for the girls of the book, which reflects how the author saw herself when she first came out.

During the production of Love, Violet, Chua consulted the art director responsible for the book and they decided to present Violet as white due to her personal connection to Sullivan Wild. While Violet and Mira initially had a more feminine design due to Chua's experience as a student in an all-girls school, Violet's design was slightly altered later on.

== Summary ==
Love, Violet tells the love story of a girl named Violet, who is too shy to say how she feels to her classmate, Mira. A quiet child, Violet wants to impress her classmate Mira on Valentine's Day by making her a heart-shaped card. After many failed attempts, Violet finally gives the card to Mira, and they gallop off to share a make-believe adventure together. The third-person narrative captures Violet and Mira's emotions and personalities, painting a picture of the romance between the girls.

== Reception ==
Kirkus Reviews praised Sullivan Wild's writing and Chua's illustrations, noting the two elements captured the emotions felt by the characters, and were able to convey the action and movement of the story. They called the story a "gentle, child-friendly romance" and "a perfect celebration of courage and queerness." Publishers Weekly's reviewer called the picture book a "uplifting wintry tale," and wrote positively about the art. Both Kirkus and PW gave the book starred reviews.

Reviewing for the School Library Journal, Amy Fellows wrote about how "[a] soothing color palette enhances the story's quiet and lighthearted tone." Fellows also commented on the various depiction of emotions by characters in the background as a learning opportunity for young readers. Fellows concluded by noting Love, Violet "fills an important need for non-heteronormative representation" among picture books.

Love, Violet was nominated for the 34th Lambda Literary Awards in the Children's/Middle Grade category. It is the 2023 recipient of the Stonewall Book Award - Mike Morgan and Larry Romans Children's and Young Adult Literature Award.

== Analysis ==
According to Amy Fellows for the School Library Journal, Love, Violet's illustrations contribute to its emotions, detail, and movement, using a particularly pale color palette to create a lighthearted and quiet tone to the story, while the use of watercolor to create transparent tones allows for the wintery setting. Warm tones are also brought in to create a happier feel to the story, and to depict each of the characters' distinct personalities, contrasting with the wintery atmosphere. Fellows also wrote that the book opens conversations about social-emotional learning as well, through animated expressions on characters' faces, and depicting various characters as different races.
