= Sylvia Aguilar Zéleny =

Mexican writer

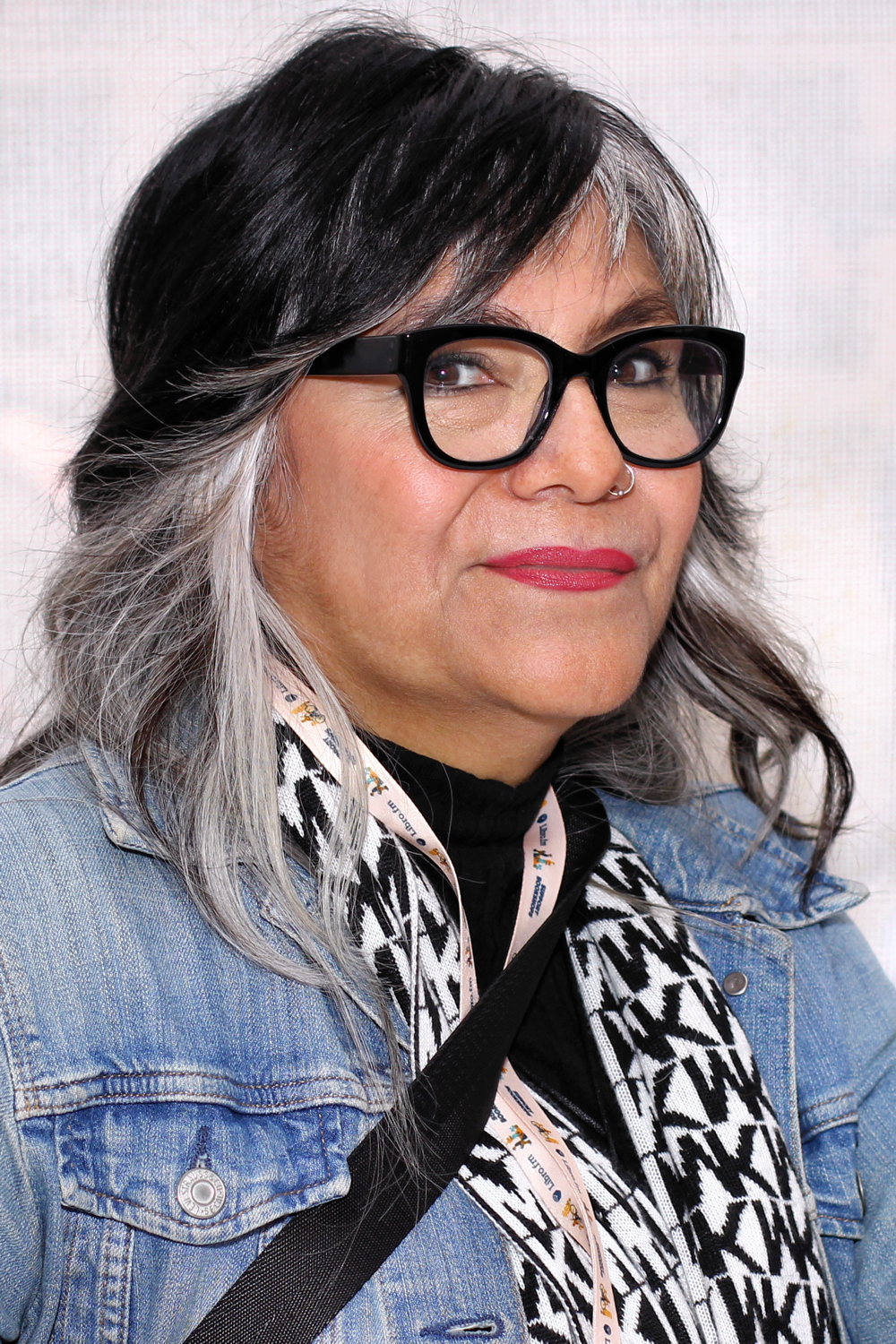
Aguilar Zéleny at the 2023 Texas Book Festival

Sylvia Aguilar Zéleny is a novelist and short story writer born in Hermosillo, Sonora, Mexico, in 1973. She studied Hispanic literature at the Universidad de Sonora and began her career as a teacher, at the Instituto Tecnologico de Estudios Superiores de Monterrey. She has an MFA in creative writing from the University of Texas at El Paso. She learned to write through workshops given by other authors such as Abigael Bohórquez, Héctor Manjarrez, David Martín del Cammpo and Cristina Rivera-Garza. Her works have appeared in Altanoche, La Tempestad, Las Hojas de la Mancuspia, Milenio, Néctar y Picnic and a large number of magazines.

Her work has won Concurso de Libro Sonorense in 2003, the Concurso de Cuento Cristina Rivera-Garza in 2005, and an honorable mention in the Concurso de Libro Sonorense in 2000. Her 2023 novel Trash was shortlisted for the 2024 Lambda Literary Award for Transgender Fiction.

Sylvia Aguilar Zéleny is a fiction writer, translator, and professor at the University of Texas at El Paso (UTEP). She teaches English Composition courses at the El Paso Community College (EPCC), and Creative Writing for the undergrad and the graduate program at UTEP. She has published eight books of fiction in Mexico, and a young adult series titled Coming Out in the United States. Her novel Todo Eso es Yo won the Tamaulipas National Book Award in Mexico in 2015.
