= Andrea Abi-Karam =

Arab-American poet and editor

- Education: Mills College (MFA)
- Occupations: Poet; performer; editor
- Writing career
- Genre: Poetry
- Notable work: EXTRATRANSMISSION; Villainy; We Want It All: An Anthology of Radical Trans Poetics

Andrea Abi-Karam is an Arab-American and trans poet, performer, and editor. They are the author of the poetry collections EXTRATRANSMISSION and Villainy, and co-editor, with Kay Gabriel, of We Want It All: An Anthology of Radical Trans Poetics.

EXTRATRANSMISSION and Villainy were finalists for the Lambda Literary Award for Transgender Poetry, and We Want It All was a finalist for the Lambda Literary Award for LGBTQ Anthology and the Publishing Triangle Award for Trans and Gender-Variant Literature.

== Work ==
Abi-Karam's chapbook The Aftermath was published by Commune Editions in 2016. Their first full-length collection, EXTRATRANSMISSION, was published by Kelsey Street Press in 2019. Reviews in The Adroit Journal and Full Stop discussed the book's treatment of the body, gender, trauma, militarism, and violence. EXTRATRANSMISSION was a 2020 Lambda Literary Award finalist for Transgender Poetry.

In 2020, Abi-Karam and Kay Gabriel edited We Want It All: An Anthology of Radical Trans Poetics, published by Nightboat Books. Publishers Weekly described the book as an anthology of works by trans writers that uses poetry to reimagine collective struggle. In a 2020 interview with Them, Abi-Karam and Gabriel discussed the anthology's selection process and its relationship to political movement work. The anthology was a 2021 Lambda Literary Award finalist for LGBTQ Anthology and a Publishing Triangle Award finalist for Trans and Gender-Variant Literature.

Abi-Karam's second collection, Villainy, was published by Nightboat Books in 2021. Reviews in Publishers Weekly, the Poetry Foundation, and the Los Angeles Review of Books discussed the collection's use of capitalization, repetition, protest, public space, grief, surveillance, and political violence. In Them, Zeyn Joukhadar wrote that Abi-Karam's performance practice incorporates the body, and that Villainy asks readers not to look away from how "pain and legacies of violence" can be entangled with healing, embodiment, and joy. Villainy was a 2022 Lambda Literary Award finalist for Transgender Poetry.

== Bibliography ==
- The Aftermath. Commune Editions, 2016.
- EXTRATRANSMISSION. Kelsey Street Press, 2019.
- We Want It All: An Anthology of Radical Trans Poetics. Co-edited with Kay Gabriel. Nightboat Books, 2020.
- Villainy. Nightboat Books, 2021.

== Awards and honors ==
- 2020 Lambda Literary Award finalist, Transgender Poetry, for EXTRATRANSMISSION.
- 2021 Lambda Literary Award finalist, LGBTQ Anthology, for We Want It All: An Anthology of Radical Trans Poetics, with Kay Gabriel.
- 2021 Publishing Triangle Award finalist, Trans and Gender-Variant Literature, for We Want It All: An Anthology of Radical Trans Poetics, with Kay Gabriel.
- 2022 Lambda Literary Award finalist, Transgender Poetry, for Villainy.
