= KJ Cerankowski =

American professor and author

- Education: University of Southern California; Stanford University (Ph.D.)
- Occupations: Professor, author
- Writing career
- Subjects: Gender studies LGBT culture Queer studies
- Notable works: Asexualities: Feminist and Queer Perspectives (2014)

KJ Cerankowski is an American professor and author whose work focuses on gender and human sexuality with a focus on asexuality studies. He is an associate professor of Comparative American Studies and Gender, Sexuality, and Feminist Studies at Oberlin College. With Megan Milks, he co-edited Asexualities: Feminist and Queer Perspectives (Routledge, 2024[2014]).

== Education and career ==
Cerankowski received a Ph.D. in Modern Thought and Literature at Stanford University in 2014; he completed a dissertation entitled Illegible: asexualities in media, literature, and performance analyzing the cultural significance of asexuality as "a queer way of thinking about sexual subjectivity, desire, and intimacy."

Cerankowski is an associate professor of Comparative American Studies and Gender, Sexuality, and Feminist Studies at Oberlin College, where he also directs the Gender, Sexuality, and Feminist Studies Program. Before joining the Oberlin faculty, he was a lecturer in the department of Feminist, Gender, and Sexuality Studies at Stanford University and a fellow at the Clayman Institute for Gender Research.

== Selected works ==
With Megan Milks, Cerankowski co-edited Asexualities: Feminist and Queer Perspectives (Routledge, 2014), one of the earliest collections of essays on the study of asexuality.

Cerankowski's writings have been published in Feminist Studies and WSQ: Women's Studies Quarterly.

Cerankowski published his first monograph, Suture: Trauma and Trans Becoming, in November 2021 and his second, Nothing Wanting: Asexuality and the Matter of Absence, in November 2025.

== See also ==
- List of LGBT writers
- List of Stanford University people
