= Kay Ulanday Barrett =

American poet and transgender rights activist

- Born: Mackinaw City, Michigan, U.S.
- Education: DePaul University
- Website: kaybarrett.net

Kay Ulanday Barrett is an American poet, performer, educator, food writer, cultural strategist, and disability advocate based in New York and New Jersey. Their second book, More Than Organs (Sibling Rivalry Press, 2020) received a 2021 Stonewall Honor Book Award by the American Library Association and was a 2021 Lambda Literary Award for Transgender Literature Finalist. They are a 2020 James Baldwin Fellowship recipient, a three-time Pushcart Prize nominee, and a two-time Best of the Net nominee. Barrett's writing and performance centers on the experience of queer, transgender, people of color, mixed race people, Asian, and Filipino/a/x community. The focus of their artistic work navigates multiple systems of oppression in the context of the United States.

== Early life and education ==
Ulanday Barrett was born in Mackinaw City, Michigan and grew up in a low-income and working class household. Their father was a merchant marine and their mother was a Filipina migrant domestic worker. Barrett began writing and poetry as a task to help their mother during her shifts cleaning motel rooms and other people's homes. After their parents' divorce, Barrett moved with their mother to Chicago, where they lived in the Albany Park and Logan Square neighborhoods. Barrett attended Lane Tech High School. They attended undergraduate studies at DePaul University and studied Women's & Gender Studies along with Political Science with a minor in English. Barrett's early work is informed by the 1990s spoken word, community theater, hip-hop, and slam poetry movements that arose in Chicago among marginalized communities of that time. They frequented open-mics, poetry slams, and community theatre spaces as well as organized in POC and migrant solidarity networks as a means to create queer and people of color community.

== Performance and speaking work ==
Barrett has been performing poetry, spoken word, and interdisciplinary theatre professionally since 2004. Their artistic influences were through touring, teaching, and collaborative work with Mango Tribe, Women Outloud!, Young Chicago Authors, The Chicago Freedom School, and Dr. Pedro Albizu Campos High School. Trained by community poets and theater artists, much of their work was centered in the practices of Theatre of The Oppressed and Popular Education as shown by ensemble residencies he attended by theHemispheric Institute, namely New World Theater and Asian Arts Initiative. Recent writing and poetry have centered on the praxis of disability justice, specifically elaborating on intersectionality of multiple communities including transgender people of color and the chronically ill and disabled community.

== Writing ==
=== Poetry ===
In 2020, Barrett said of their poetry, "There are elements of traditional form in my poetry but then there’s also super contemporary modern form — list poems, blues poems, and then I’ll use a pantoum”. In the 2014 anthology Trans Bodies, Trans Selves, Barrett's work is described as “alternatively admonishing, encouraging, and elevating the queer and trans communities".

Barrett is the author of two poetry collections: When The Chant Comes (published 2016) and More Than Organs (published 2020 by Sibling Rivalry Press). The latter was a 2021 Lambda Literary Award Finalist and an American Library Association Stonewall Book Award Honor Book.

=== Publications ===
==== Books ====
- When The Chant Comes. Topside Press. 2016.
- More Than Organs. Sibling Rivalry Press. 2020. ISBN 9781943977741.

==== Essays ====
- "Eat Good for Me: An Essay on Your Late Mother's Birthday". The Maine Review. 6 (2). September 2020.
- Barrett, Kay Ulanday; Hanna, Karen Buenavista; Palomar, Anang (2021). "In Defense of the X: Centering Queer, Trans, and Non-Binary Pilipina/x/os, Queer Vernacular, and the Politics of Naming". Alon: Journal for Filipinx American and Diasporic Studies. 1 (2): 125–148. ISSN 2767-4568.

==== Poems ====
- Barrett, Kay Ulanday (2016-08-25). "On longing the fantastical". In Mann Willis, Morgan (ed.). Outside the XY: Black and Brown Queer Masculinity. Riverdale Avenue Books LLC. ISBN 978-1-62601-303-2.
- Barrett, Kay Ulanday (2021). "In Which I Watch YouTube to Watch Fan Video Edits of You: For Nico Minoru on Marvel's Runaways". In Manalansan, Martin F.; Hom, Alice Y.; Fajardo, Kale Bantigue; Eng, David L. (eds.). Q & A: Voices from Queer Asian North America. Asian American history and culture. Philadelphia: Temple University Press. pp. 313–314. ISBN 978-1-4399-2108-1.
- "To Hold the Grief & the Growth: On Crip Ecologies". Poetry. 219 (4): 310–322. 2022. ISSN 0032-2032.
- "Nocturne with hysterectomy". The Massachusetts Review. 63 (4): 721–721. December 2022. doi:10.1353/mar.2022.0109. ISSN 2330-0485.
- "A postmortem story or how archaeologists might fail me". Women's Studies Quarterly. 51 (3–4): 309–310. September 2023. doi:10.1353/wsq.2023.a910210. ISSN 1934-1520.
- "Mid-day subway: there are no icebreakers or pronouns for this". Women's Studies Quarterly. 51 (3–4): 308–308. September 2023. doi:10.1353/wsq.2023.a910100. ISSN 1934-1520.
- "Lilacs were my first rhapsody". The Hopkins Review. 17 (2): 42–42. March 2024. doi:10.1353/thr.2024.a924105. ISSN 1939-9774.

== Career ==
They have received fellowships & residencies from Millay Arts (2023), Tin House (2022), MacDowell (2020), Lambda Literary (2017, 2018), VONA Voices (2018), and Macondo (2018). In 2018 they were guest faculty at the Poetry Foundation. They have featured and given keynotes at venues such as The United Nations, The Whitney, The Museum of Modern Art, The Lincoln Center, Symphony Space, Brooklyn Museum, Hemispheric Institute, Queens Museum, and the Chicago Historical Society.

=== Teaching ===
Barrett has been an educator teaching poetry, spoken word, theatre, slam poetry, and cultural work at various high schools and youth arts organizations nationwide. They also lead workshops on intersectionality, social justice, disability and chronic illness.

== Personal life ==
Barrett is mixed race and of Filipino descent. They are queer, genderqueer, and gender non-conforming trans non-binary, and have used the pronouns they, he, k, ne, and pogi (a Tagalog term). They have undergone elective top surgery and an emergency hysterectomy. Barrett is disabled and experiences chronic pain, which influences their work. As of 2020, Barrett is based in New York City.

== Honors and awards ==
Barrett has received the following awards:

- 2021 ALA Stonewall Book Award Barbara Gittings Honor Book (Poetry & Literature), for More Than Organs
- 2021 Lambda Literary Award Finalist in Transgender Poetry, for More Than Organs
- MacDowell Artist-In-Residence (2020 Poetry, Literature)
- James Baldwin Fellowship (2020, MacDowell)
- Best of the Net Nominee, Split This Rock (2019)
- F(r)iction Magazine, Guest Judge, Poetry (2019)
- 9 Transgender and Gender Nonconforming Writers You Should Know: VOGUE (2018)
- The Leeway Foundation, Funding Panelist & Judge (2018)
- Lambda Literary Review, Writer-In-Residence: Poetry (2018)
- Pushcart Prize, Nomination: Poetry (2017)
- Pushcart Prize, Nomination: Poetry (2016)
- Trans 100, Curator (2014)
- 18 Million Rising Filipino American History Month Hero (2013)
- Trans 100: 100 Most Amazing Transgender People in the U.S. (2013)
- Trans Justice Funding Panel (2013)
- Trans 100 Honoree (2013)
- QWOC Media Wire's Top 5 LGBT People of Color POETS (2013)
- Transgender Leadership Summit Advisory Board (2012)
- Filipino American Historical Society Feature (2011)
- Campus PRIDE HOT List Artist (2009–2010)
- Crossroads Foundation Individual Activist Award (2005)
- Gwendolyn Brooks Open-Mic Award, Finalist (2005)
- Windy City Times "30 Under 30" Award (2005)
- Windy City Times PRIDE Poetry 1st Prize (2009)
