= Trans poetry =

Genre of literature

Trans poetry is a type of transgender literature which explores the individuality, gender identity, and accounts of life experiences by transgender poets. Some aspects of trans poetry fall under the umbrella of protest literature and speak to the hegemonic worldview, presenting the agenda of injustice subjected by the oppressed. Other examples of trans poetry analyze the adversities endured by binary trans-women and men. The categories listed explore the contributions of notable trans-poets such as Lee Mokobe, author of "What it Feels Like to be a Transgender", Ely Shipley, author of "Boy with Flowers" and Shilok Mukkati, author of "Kinnaras of the Dark World".

== History ==
One of the earliest instances of transgender poetry is a piece from the French poet Kalonymus ben Kalonymus, "Prayer for Transformation". "Prayer for Transformation" is a selection from the poem "Even Bohan", with various editions of this poem emerging as early as the 15th century. Kalonymus articulates their experiences and hardships of achieving societal approval for wanting to transition into a woman through their literary works. Historians believe this to be the earliest recorded poem that deals with gender dysphoria. Compared to works of Kalonymus, a collection of modernized historical literary works of transgender poetry can be found in an anthology compiled by Rupert Raj, an awarded trans activist and transgender man. This anthology covers poetic pieces from 1967-1991 spanning over 160 transgender poets that’s split and categorized into three books.

=== Notable events ===
- Trace Peterson created the United States' first transgender poetry course at Hunter College. (2015)
- India's first government-funded Transgender poetry meet hosted by the Sahitya Akademi. This event was presided over by Manabi Bandyopadhyay a transgender writer and college principal. (2018)

== Notable trans poets ==
Lee Mokobe is a published poet, Human Rights Activist, TEDx speaker, and founder of Vocal Revolutionaries from Cape Town, South Africa. Mokobe’s work traverses across LGBTQ+ issues, gender discrimination, and African History. His most notable poem is What It’s Like Being Transgender in which he expresses his difficulty as a trans individual.

Ely Shipley is an author, poet, and professor from Washington, USA. Shipley’s works include “Boy with Flowers” which discusses childhood hardships and “Some Animal”. He has been nominated and won various awards for his literary works.

Shilok Mukkati is an intersectional feminist who has a background in dance, theater, public speaking, and poetry. Mukkati's work aims to convey meaningful messages with the LGBTQ+ community that intersect with her own experiences and feelings. Her work ranges from queer literature and art to activism in India. Kinnaras of the Dark World is one of Mukkati’s most notable queer works in the form of short films.

== Characteristics ==
Trans poetry sharpens the lines that are blurred between the ambiguities of gender identity by using poetic diction to break up the unchanging lingual habits, which allows its readers to resist heteronormative conventions. Trans poetry allows the writer to reflect on one’s identity through a psychological and physiological points of view. Poetry’s ability to stretch the boundaries of language and thought has been a recurring theme since the mid-19th century by renowned poets such as Walt Whitman and Emily Dickinson.

Ely Shipley follows suit with this tradition through his illustrative desires that are demonstrated through his works to authenticate the concept of gender identity and reassignment into societal norms. This is particularly evident in Shipley’s poem "Boy with Flowers", where his syntax intentionally articulates the textualization of gender.

This genre of literary work encourages both cisgender and transgender readers to surpass the narratives supporting ideologies that suggest “normative” perspectives about gender that are degrading and exclusive. Lee Mokobe's "What it Feels like to be Transgender" highlights the inertial threat of Western religion against trans-identity, a commonly reoccurring theme among the queer community. Such narratives can serve as an affirmation to many of those conflicted in the same manner.

=== Typical themes ===
Through trans poetry, individuals illustrate their experiences of maltreatment through personal occurrences and contradictions of common societal beliefs. This genre of poetry often aims to target obstacles regarding trans-identity through the roles of religion, society, and politics. About Lee Mokobe's poem, the reader is directed to the subject of religion, feelings of negligence through God, and childhood experiences living with forced heteronormative beliefs. This genre of poetry explores sensitive topics of hypothetical invisibility, difficulties maintaining mental wellness, displayed as entertainment for others, and the death of other transgender individuals.

Experiences of gender dysphoria and struggles of accepting their identities are also shared through trans poetry. In divergence from the negative elements of trans poetry, this genre also illustrates instances of acceptance and reflection of one’s self-identity. The objective of these literary works is to offer support and comfort, both for the author and the reader. The achievement of including these elements in their poems captivates the reader through shared experiences, establishing relatability, inclusivity, and protection for all readers.

== See also ==
- Homoerotic poetry
