= Helen Boyd =

American memoirist (born 1969)

Gail Kramer
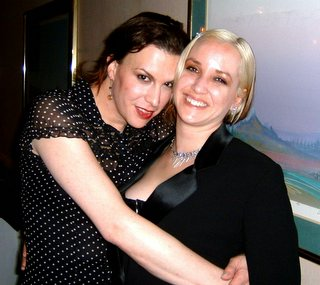
- Gail Kramer (right) and Betty Crow in 2005
- Born: 1969 (age 56–57)
- Education: The City College of New York
- Occupations: Academic and author
- Writing career
- Pen name: Helen Boyd
- Subjects: Autobiography, Transgender Liberation
- Website: www.helenboydbooks.com

Helen Boyd is the pen name of Gail Kramer (born 1969), an American author, academic, and activist. Helen is the author two books about her relationship with her trans partner. Her partner is referred to in both books as "Betty Crow", though this is also a pseudonym. Helen is on staff at Lawrence University in Appleton, Wisconsin as the I.D.E.A.S. Division Affinity Groups Coordinator and PRIDE Center Coordinator.

== Biography ==
Helen Boyd graduated Phi Beta Kappa from City College of New York in 1995 with a degree in literature. She has been a guest speaker at trans conferences, including the IFGE, First Event, Fantasia Fair, Southern Comfort, the Chicago Be-All, and also at events like Trans Issues Week at Yale University. Helen and Betty have spoken about LGBT marriage on PBS's In The Life. As of 2011, she is also a lecturer of Gender and Freshman Studies at Lawrence University.

Boyd's activism was recognized in 2020 when she was named a "Champion of Pride" by The Advocate.

Boyd formerly ran the mHB Forums, a message board for the discussion of crossdressing- and transgender-related topics.

== Bibliography ==
=== My Husband Betty ===
My Husband Betty (2003, Seal Press) is a non-fiction book by author Helen Boyd about crossdressers and their partners. It was a finalist for a Lambda Literary Award.

The book was reviewed in Booklist, Kirkus Reviews, and Publishers Weekly.

=== She's Not The Man I Married ===
Boyd's second book is She's Not the Man I Married: My Life with a Transgender Husband (Seal Press, 2007). An excerpt of this book was featured in On the Issues magazine.

The book was reviewed in The Gay & Lesbian Review Worldwide, The Indypendent, and Publishers Weekly.

== See also ==
- List of transgender publications
- List of transgender-related topics
