= Golden (poet) =

American poet and artist

- Occupation: Poet; artist
- Education: New York University (BFA)
- Notable works: A Dead Name That Learned How to Live; Reprise
- Notable awards: Lambda Literary Award for Transgender Poetry finalist (2023, 2026)

Golden is a gender-nonconforming American poet and artist who uses they/them pronouns. Their poetry collections A Dead Name That Learned How to Live and Reprise were finalists for the Lambda Literary Award for Transgender Poetry in 2023 and 2026.

== Early life and education ==
Golden was raised in Hampton, Virginia. They hold a BFA in photography and imaging from New York University. Golden moved to Boston in 2018.

== Career ==
=== Poetry ===
Golden's debut poetry collection, A Dead Name That Learned How to Live, was published by Game Over Books in 2022. WBUR reported that the book grew out of Golden's NYU thesis project of the same name and examined family history and personal identity. In In These Times, Sherell Barbee interviewed Golden about the book in relation to photography, family, place, and gender. The collection was a finalist for the 2023 Lambda Literary Award for Transgender Poetry.

Golden's second collection, Reprise: Poems and Photographs, was published by Haymarket Books in 2025. It was a finalist for the 2026 Lambda Literary Award for Transgender Poetry.

=== Photography and visual art ===
Golden's visual work includes portraiture, self-portraiture, and images made with family archives. Their photographic series On Learning How to Live was a finalist for the 2021 Arnold Newman Prize for New Directions in Photographic Portraiture.

Golden was a Neighborhood Salon Luminaries fellow at the Isabella Stewart Gardner Museum. In In These Times, Golden said that a later Gardner Museum commission responded to Boston's Apollo, an exhibition about John Singer Sargent and Thomas McKeller.

From 2020 to 2021, Golden was a Boston Artist-in-Residence. During the residency, they proposed a public mural honoring Rita Hester, a Black transgender woman from Allston. The City of Boston commissioned artist Rixy to create the mural, Rita's Spotlight, which was installed in 2022. In 2023, Golden's exhibition I'm Never Alone was shown at Brookline Arts Center's Beacon Street Gallery.

== Works ==
=== Poetry collections ===
- A Dead Name That Learned How to Live. Game Over Books, 2022.
- Reprise: Poems and Photographs. Haymarket Books, 2025.

=== Selected art ===
- On Learning How to Live, photographic series.
- I'm Never Alone, exhibition, Brookline Arts Center, 2023–2024.

== Awards ==
- 2023: Finalist, Lambda Literary Award for Transgender Poetry, for A Dead Name That Learned How to Live
- 2026: Finalist, Lambda Literary Award for Transgender Poetry, for Reprise: Poems and Photographs
