= C. Riley Snorton =

American scholar, author, and activist

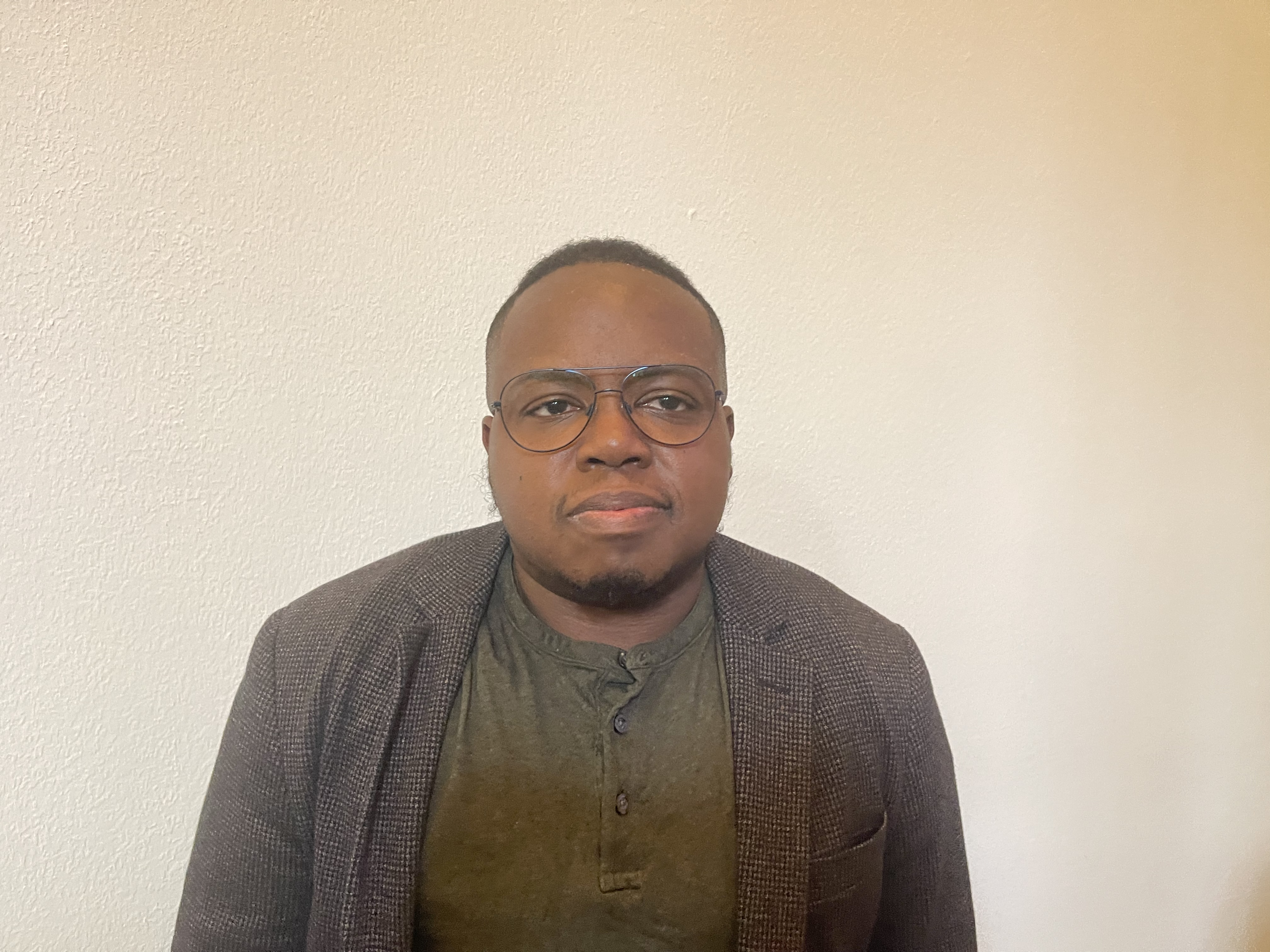
C. Riley Snorton at the Museum of Art and History in Geneva, March 2024.

C. Riley Snorton is an American scholar, author, and activist whose work focuses on historical perspectives of gender and race, specifically Black transgender identities. His publications include Nobody is Supposed to Know: Black Sexuality on the Down Low (University of Minnesota Press, 2014) and Black on Both Sides: A Racial History of Trans Identity (University of Minnesota Press, 2017). Snorton is currently Professor of English Language and Literature at the University of Chicago. In 2014 BET listed him as one of their "18 Transgender People You Should Know".

== Biography ==
C. Riley Snorton is a Black transgender cultural theorist who focuses on racial, sexual and transgender histories and cultural productions. Snorton was born in the Bronx and raised in Wedgefield, SC, Sumter, SC and attended high school in Atlanta, GA. He has 3 older siblings and one younger sibling. Snorton earned an A.B. in Women and Gender Studies at Columbia University (2003), an M.A. in Communication at the University of Pennsylvania (2008), and he also earned his Ph.D. in Communication and Culture, with graduate certificates in Africana Studies and Gender & Sexuality Studies from the University of Pennsylvania in 2010. He is a recipient of a predoctoral fellowship at the W.E.B. Du Bois Institute at Harvard University (2009), a Mellon postdoctoral fellowship at Pomona College (2010), and a National Endowment for the Humanities fellowship at the Schomburg Center for Research in Black Culture (2015). He is currently Professor of English Language and Literature and is jointly appointed in the Center for Gender and Sexuality Studies at the University of Chicago. He is currently working on a book project with the tentative title Mud: Ecologies of Racial Meaning where he will examine racial practices in relation to swamps and is coediting the forthcoming The Flesh of the Matter: A Hortense Spillers Reader.

== Publications ==
=== Books ===
- Saturation: Race, Art and the Circulation of Value. Cambridge: MIT Press/ New Museum, 2020. Co-Editor. A collection of essays, conversations, and portfolios that offers new approaches to and questions about representational, art, and race. This presents an alternative strategy that considers structural reform and resource redistribution in addition to racial representation issues. Contributors address issues at the nexus of art, racism, and representation in novel ways in their essays, talks, debates, and artist portfolios. Saturation is used as an organizational principle in the book, partly to imply that the complicated reality of race cannot be captured by existing paradigms. There are ways to place race in relation to perception, science, aesthetics, the physical body, and sound through saturation.
- Black on Both Sides: A Racial History of Trans Identity. Minneapolis, MN: University of Minnesota Press, 2017. In Snorton's second book he provides an attempt to map together histories of race, gender, and sexuality in the United States to examine the origins of modern black transgender identities. Although Snorton's research draws from medical texts and journalistic narratives he makes the effort of letting the reader know that Black on Both Sides is "not a history per se so much as it is a set of political propositions, theories of history, and writerly experiments"(6). Snorton is interested in complicating and acknowledging the ways that blackness and transness do not follow a linear trajectory of time. Instead, Snorton focuses on the ways in which “blackness and transness emerge” from slavery to emancipation up until the popular use of the Internet in the 1990s. The book engages black feminist thought, queer- and trans-of-color critique, visual culture studies, and disability theory to explain “how the condensation of transness into the category of transgender is a racial narrative, as it also attends to how blackness finds articulation within transness” (8). Drawing on an “eclectic archive” compiled of medical illustrations, fugitive slave narratives, true crime books, and more, Snorton suggests that “To feel black in the diaspora, then, might be a trans experience” (8). He also addresses present-day anti-black and anti-trans violence, discussing in the preface of the book Laverne Cox, and the deaths of Tamara Dominguez and Black Lives Matter activist Blake Brockington. In 2017, Black on Both Sides won a William Sanders Scarborough Prize, in 2018, it won the Lambda Literary Award for Transgender Nonfiction and the Sylvia Rivera Award in Transgender Studies. In 2019, it won a John Boswell Prize.
- Nobody is Supposed to Know: Black Sexuality on the Down Low. Minneapolis, MN: University of Minnesota Press, 2014. In his first book, Snorton writes about "down low" black men and the representation in media and popular culture. This book examines the phenomenon of the down low, where Black men engage in same-sex sexual activity while publicly presenting as heterosexual by analyzing how media and popular culture portray this practice as a dangerous and deceitful aspect of Black sexuality, often linked to HIV stigma and reinforcing negative stereotypes about Black men.

=== Journal articles and Book chapters ===
- "‘A New Hope’: The Psychic Life of Passing." Hypatia: A Journal of Feminist Philosophy 24.3 (2009): 77-92.
- "Trapped in the Epistemological Closet: Black Sexuality and the ‘Ghettocentric Imagination.’" Souls: A Critical Journal of Black Politics, Culture and Society, 11.2 (2009): 94-111.
- "Trans Necropolitics: A Transnational Reflection on Violence, Death, and the Trans of Color Afterlife." Co-authored with Jin Haritaworn in the Transgender Studies Reader, 2nd Edition. Eds. Susan Stryker and Aren Aizura. (New York: Routledge, 2013): 66-76.
- "On the Question of ‘Who's Out in Hip Hop.’" Souls: A Critical Journal of Black Politics, Culture and Society 16.3 -4 (2014): 283 - 302.
- "An Ambiguous Heterotopia: On the Past of Black Studies’ Futures." The Black Scholar, 44.2 (2014): 29–36.
- "Gender Trouble on Triton." In No Tea, No Shade: New Writings in Black Queer Studies. Ed. E. Patrick Johnson. (Durham, NC: Duke University Press, 2016): 105–123.
- "Gender." In Keywords in African American Studies, Edited by. Erica Edward and Rodrick Ferguson. (New York: New York University Press, 2020): 90-92.
- "Afterword: On Crisis and Abolition." In AIDS and the Distribution of Crises, Edited by Jih-Fei Cheng, Alexandra Juhasz, and Nishant Shahani. (NC: Duke University Press, 2020): 313-318.
- "We Got Issues: Toward a Black Trans*/Studies " TSQ 4, no. 2 (2017) Edited by Treva Ellison, K. Marshall Green, Matt Richardson, and C. Riley Snorton.
- “Trans*historicities”: A Roundtable Discussion" TSQ (2018) 5 (4): 658–685. M. W. Bychowski; Howard Chiang; Jack Halberstam; Jacob Lau; Kathleen P. Long; Marcia Ochoa; C. Riley Snorton; Leah DeVun; Zeb Tortoric,
- "The Temporality of Radical Potential?" in GLQ: A Journal of Lesbian and Gay Studies, Duke University Press Volume 25, Number 1, January 2019, 159-161.
- "Hell You Talmbout?” Sighting confusion in the performance of Black Revolt" in Women & Performance: a journal of feminist theory (2021) co-authored with Ra Malika Imhotep and SJ Zhang, 331-343

== Awards and distinctions ==
- 1999: Kluge Fellowship, Columbia University, New York, New York 1999-2003.
- 2006: Fontaine fellowship, University of Pennsylvania, Philadelphia, PA.
- 2008: James D. Woods Teaching Award, Annenberg School for Communication, University of Pennsylvania, Philadelphia.
- 2009: Sheila Biddle Ford Foundation Fellowship, W.E.B. Du Bois Institute for African and African American research, Harvard University, Cambridge, MA.
- 2010: W.E.B. Du Bois Non-Residential Fellowship, W.E.B. Du Bois Institute for African and African American Research, Harvard University, Cambridge, MA.
- 2011: Consortium for Faculty Diversity/Andrew W. Mellon Postdoctoral Fellowship, Two-year Award, Media Studies Department, Pomona College, Claremont, CA.
- 2014: Lavender Mentorship Award, LGBTQ Student Association, Northwestern University, Evanston, IL.
- 2015: National Endowment for the Humanities/Schomburg Center Scholar-in-Residence Fellowship, Schomburg Center for Research in Black Culture and the New York Public Library, New York Public Library, New York, NY.
- 2017: William Sanders Scarborough Prize, Modern Language Association, New York, NY.
- 2018: Lambda Literary Award for Transgender Nonfiction, Lambda Literary, New York, NY.
- 2018: Sylvia Rivera Award in Transgender Studies, the Center for Lesbian and Gay Studies, New York, NY.
- 2019: John Boswell Prize, Committee on Lesbian, Gay, Bisexual & Transgender History, American Historical Association, Washington, DC.
- 2023: F.O. Matthiessen Visiting Professor of Gender and Sexuality at Harvard University
- 2024: Visiting Professor of English and Comparative Literature and ISSG at Columbia University
