= Matt Kailey =

Author, educator, and transgender activist

- Born: March 17, 1955; Omaha, Nebraska
- Died: May 18, 2014 (aged 59)
- Occupations: Writer, educator, activist
- Writing career
- Language: English
- Subject: LGBT
- Notable work: "Just Add Hormones"

Matthew Scott "Matt" Kailey (March 17, 1955 – May 18, 2014) was a trans male author, educator, and transgender activist.

== Biography ==
Kailey was born in 1955 in Omaha, Nebraska to Shirley and George "Rod" Kailey. He earned a BA in Sociology and Psychology at Iowa State University and an MA in Education from the University of Missouri-Kansas City. He later moved to Colorado and began a career as a social caseworker.

Kailey began his female-to-male transition at the age of 42, transitioning from a straight woman to a gay trans man. After leaving social work, he became a writer for Out Front Colorado, one of the country's oldest LGBT publications. In 2007 he became its managing editor, making Kailey the highest-ranking trans journalist of an LGBT publication.

Kailey documented his gender transition in his books Just Add Hormones: An Insider's Guide to the Transsexual Experience (2005) and Teeny Weenies and Other Short Subjects (2012). Just Add Hormones was a finalist for the 2006 Lambda Award for Transgender Literature, and Teeny Weenies was a finalist for the 2013 Lambda Award for Transgender Nonfiction.

Kailey wrote a guidebook, My Child is Transgender: 10 Tips for Parents of Adult Trans Children. He wrote an award-winning blog, Tranifesto, spoke at numerous conferences, and offered workplace training on transgender issues. He also taught courses in psychology, human sexuality, and transgender studies at Red Rocks Community College and Metropolitan State University of Denver.

Kailey died in his sleep of heart failure on May 18, 2014.

== Books ==
- Our Day Will Come, 2004, iUniverse, Inc., ISBN 0595305989; ISBN 978-0595305988
- Just Add Hormones: An Insider's Guide to the Transsexual Experience, 2005, Beacon Press, ISBN 978-0807079584
- Focus on the Fabulous: Colorado GLBT Voices (editor), 2007, Johnson Books, ISBN 978-1555663988
- Teeny Weenies and Other Short Subjects, 2012, Outskirts Press, ISBN 978-1432781200
- My Child is Transgender: 10 Tips for Parents of Adult Trans Children, 2012, Tranifesto Publishing
