= The Third Person =

2022 graphic novel by Emma Grove

- Author: Emma Grove
- Language: English
- Genre: Graphic novel; Memoir
- Publisher: Drawn & Quarterly
- Publication date: May 3, 2022
- Publication place: United States
- Pages: 920
- ISBN: 978-1-77046-615-9

The Third Person is the debut graphic novel and memoir of artist Emma Grove. Published on May 3, 2022 by Drawn & Quarterly, it tells the story of a woman seeking psychiatric care to receive feminizing hormone therapy. Consequently, her therapist begins to suspect that she has dissociative identity disorder, complicating her treatment.

Grove states the memoir was only intended to discuss her transition, but when attending therapy during the making of the book, she decided to include her DID experience.

== Reception ==
Publishers Weekly praised Emma Grove's art style, saying that her "marvelously elastic, emotive art is reminiscent of Jules Feiffer." The reviewer also commented that, while most of the story happens in the same place, the memoir never becomes "visually dull." They concluded by saying that Grove's writing "draws readers into Emma's world and makes them feel the complexities and contradictions of her experience." The Third Person was one of Publishers Weekly's Summer Reads staff pick for 2022.

Kirkus Reviews, which gave the novel a starred review, commented how, despite being 900 pages long, The Third Person is a "brisk reading experience" due to the "minimalist illustrations and powerful dialogue exchanges." They further note how Grove's talent at drawing the various facial expressions and movement done by the characters "embellishes the journey". Writing for the Library Journal, Tom Batten gave it a starred review and called Grove's novel "an unflinching exploration of how our identities are formed and maintained."

Brendan Buck, who reviewed for Newcity Lit, commented on the overall narrative of the book, noting that, while Grove's novel is quick to read, it's not easy, saying "it's about untangling trauma toward a certain truth, but it's also about the trauma created in the untangling." Talking about the drawings, Buck notes that, despite the simple art style, Grove is capable of differentiating the main character's various personalities with her "distinct character design".

Avery Kaplan of The Beat positively reviewed the book, stating the that "The Third Person is an achievement, and one that could only be accomplished in comics"

The book was listed in Bookriot's 8 queer graphic novels in 2022 and BuzzFeed's 19 books for disability awareness month in 2023. The book was longlisted for the 2023 Andrew Carnegie Medal for Excellence in Nonfiction. It was also featured in The Beat's 30 best comics of 2022.

The book won the 2023 Lambda Literary Award for Transgender Literature for non-fiction.
