= Roque Salas Rivera =

Puerto Rican poet (born 1985)

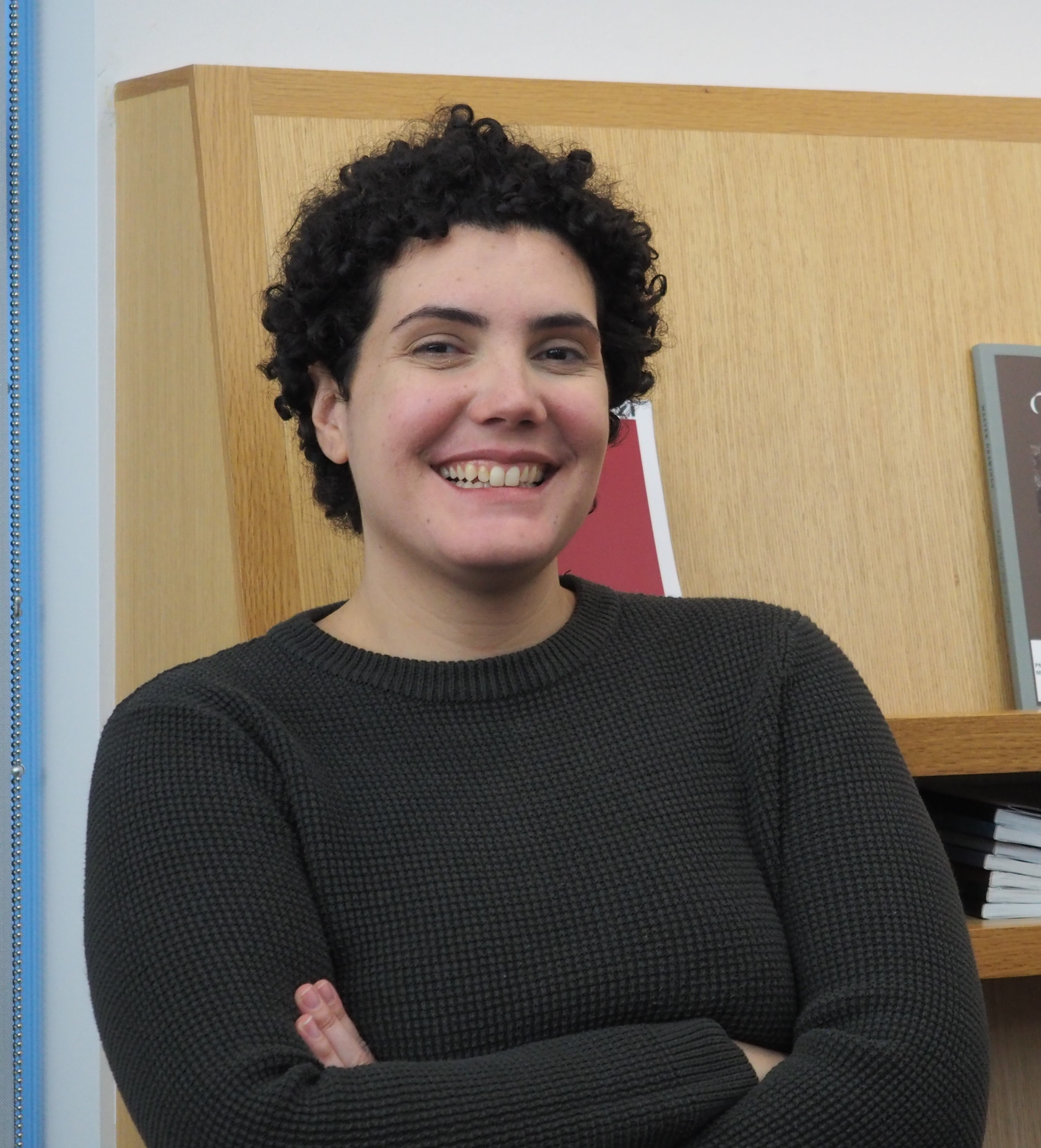
- Born: 1985 (age 40–41); Mayaguez, Puerto Rico
- Occupation: Poet
- Writing career
- Notable works: Caneca de anhelos turbios, tierra intermitente, lo terciario

Roque Raquel Salas Rivera (born 1985) is a Puerto Rican poet who writes in Spanish and English, focusing on the experience of being a migrant to the United States, the colonial status of Puerto Rico, and non-binary identity. He currently lives in Puerto Rico.

== Education and early life ==
Salas Rivera was born in Mayagüez, Puerto Rico and moved to Madison, Wisconsin when he was 6 months old. During his childhood years, he lived in California, Nebraska, Alabama, and Texas. He returned to Puerto Rico during his teenage years and young adulthood, moving to Philadelphia for graduate studies. His grandfather, Sotero Rivera Avilés, was a Puerto Rican poet belonging to the Guajana Generation, as is his mother, linguist Yolanda Rivera Castillo.

Salas Rivera attended the University of Puerto Rico at Mayagüez for his undergraduate degree, and had an instrumental role in organizing student protests at that campus in 2010. He has a Ph.D. in Comparative Literature and Literary Theory from the University of Pennsylvania and was selected as the fourth Poet Laureate of Philadelphia in 2018.

== Career and writing ==
External videos
- "Gringo Death Coloring Book by Eric Mena, Mariana Ramos Ortiz, and Raquel Salas Rivera"
- "Raquel Salas Rivera Reads Four Poems in Spanish and English", October 23, 2018, Poets.org
- "Raquel Salas Rivera - Philadelphia's Poet Laureate", February 28, 2018, AL DÍA News Media

Salas Rivera's writing emphasizes movement and often deals with themes of migration and the experience of belonging to multiple homes and allegiances. He prefers to write in Spanish, and later sometimes translates his works to English. For public readings, he often recites works only in Spanish, asserting that "It's a political act" to have an audience of non-Spanish speakers listen to a language they don't understand, as the momentary discomfort echoes the everyday struggles of immigrants who don't yet understand the language of their new country.

His work lo terciario/the tertiary addresses the Puerto Rican debt crisis and impact of the 2016 United States PROMESA Law that transferred control of the island's finances and outstanding debt to an external control board. Salas Rivera titled each book section after Marxist economic ideas from Das Kapital: "The Debt-Production Process," "The Debt-Circulation Process," and "Notes on a Derailed Circulation", beginning each poem with a quote by Karl Marx, as both a critique and a subversion of Marxist language.

Salas Rivera identifies as non-binary and uses he/him and they/them pronouns. He has adopted the Spanish word "buchipluma", in as a neologism for a "non-binary feathered butch" to describe his gender identity. One of his inspirations is the Puerto Rican Latin trap singer Bad Bunny. To Salas Rivera, poetry has given him "an inside", "an outside", and "a means for talking about things", referencing gender identity. Acknowledging a historical lack of transgender persons' voices in literature, Salas Rivera has attempted to "navigate" this gap by speaking from a transgender perspective.

During his tenure as Poet Laureate of Philadelphia, Salas Rivera created a multilingual poetry festival called "We (Too) Are Philly" inspired by the work "I, Too" by the African-American poet Langston Hughes. The summer 2018 festival, co-organized with poets Ashley Davis, Kirwyn Sutherland, and Raena Shirali, featured Philadelphia-based poets of color. The goal of the organizers was to diversify the poetry scene to encourage the mixing or desegregation of audiences, while selecting locations of significance to particular Philadelphia neighborhoods that usually do not host poetry readings.

Roque's 2025 book, Algarabía, is a trans epic poem written in Puerto Rican Spanish and English. Both Spanish and English covers incorporate a centaur illustration by Natalia Bosque Chico. It won the 2026 Lambda Literary Award for Transgender Literature.

== Personal life ==
Salas Rivera lives in San Juan, Puerto Rico. In 2017, Salas Rivera and Allison Harris raised thousands of dollars to assist lesbian, gay, bisexual, and transgender Puerto Ricans who were impacted by Hurricane Maria that year. Through his efforts, he was able to bring 5 queer/transgender persons to the United States and support them, with assistance from the Mazzoni Center.

== Works ==
Books of poetry

- 2025: Algarabía. Graywolf Press, ISBN 9781644453513
- 2022: antes que isla es volcán / before island is volcano. Beacon Press, ISBN 0807014575, OCLC 1277183477
- 2020: x/ex/exis. Bilingual Press/Editorial Bilingüe.
- 2019: Puerto Rico en mi corazón, ed. Salas Rivera, Maldonado, Mena, Del Valle Schorske, Anomalous Press.
- 2019: while they sleep (under the bed is another country). Birds, LLC.
- 2018: lo terciario/the tertiary, ISBN 9781937421274 OCLC 1055273795
- 2017: tierra intermitente/intermittent land. Ediciones Alayubia, 1st ed.
- 2017: Desdominios. Douda Correria. (Portuguese translation) OCLC 1076641364
- 2016: oropel/tinsel. ISBN 9780996766920 OCLC 1021770124
- 2011: Caneca de anhelos turbios, ISBN 9781450760966 OCLC 764494213

Artist books

- Gringo Death Coloring Book, with art by Erica Mena and Mariana Ramos Ortiz

Editorial works

- #27 :: Indigenous Futures and Imagining the Decolonial, co-edited with BBP Hosmillo and Sarah Clark, Anomalous Press.
- Puerto Rico en Mi Corazón, co-edited with Erica Mena, Ricardo Alberto Maldonado, and Carina del Valle Schorske, Anomalous Press.
- The Wanderer, co-editor, 2016-2018.

Contributor to anthologies

- 2018: Small blows against encroaching totalitarianism., ISBN 9781944211615 OCLC 1049785850

Salas Rivera has also published in periodicals such as the Revista del Instituto de Cultura Puertorriqueña, Apiary, Apogee, BOAAT, and the Boston Review.

== Awards and honors ==
Salas Rivera was a resident artist of the 2018-2019 Kimmel Center Jazz Residency, a 2019 Playwright Fellow at the Sundance Institute Theater Program, a 2020 writer in residence for the Norwegian Festival of Literature, and a 2020 resident artist of the MacDowell Colony.

He was chosen as the fourth poet laureate of Philadelphia in 2018, under the auspices of the Free Library of Philadelphia. According to the selection committee, the poet was chosen because of his desire to use poetry to engage the subject of diversity in Philadelphia and its Puerto Rican community.

He received the 2018 Ambroggio Prize from the Academy of American Poets, honoring poets whose first language is Spanish, for his manuscript x/ex/exis (poemas para la nación).

His work lo terciario/the tertiary was longlisted for the National Book Award for Poetry in 2018, and won the 2019 Lambda Literary Award for Transgender Literature in poetry.

== See also ==
- List of Puerto Rican writers
- Puerto Rican literature
