= Charlotte Sullivan Wild =

American children's book author

Charlotte Sullivan Wild is an American author of children's books. She is best known for her 2021 picture book Love, Violet.

== Early life and education ==
Wild grew up in a religious setting in Minnesota, where being queer was seen as a negative. As such, she did not come out until she was an adult.

Wild received her Master of Science in curriculum and instruction from Minnesota State University, Mankato and her Master of Fine Arts in fiction from Hamline University.

== Career ==
Before devoting herself to writing full-time, Wild "worked as an educator, bookseller, volunteer radio host, and creator of children’s literature events".

=== The Amazing Idea of You (2019) ===
Wild published The Amazing Idea of You, illustrated by Mary Lundquist, with Bloomsbury Publishing in 2019.

The Amazing Idea of You was well received by critics. Kirkus Reviews called the book "a saccharine bedtime read-aloud about big ideas and the promise in everyone". On behalf of Booklist, Connie Fletcher referred to it as "a book to pore over and think about". She highlighted the "lyrical and often stunning" language and how Lundquist's illustrations "depict the various living things realistically, but also have a contemplative quality to them". In a starred review, Publishers Weekly described the illustrations as "clear" and "airy".

=== Love, Violet (2021) ===
Wild published her second book, Love, Violet, illustrated by Charlene Chua, with Farrar, Straus and Giroux in 2021. The book follows a girl named Violet, who is too shy to say how she feels to her classmate, Mira.

Love, Violet was well received by critics, including a starred review from Publishers Weekly. Kirkus Reviews called it "a sweetly empathetic, child-friendly girl-girl romance".

Love, Violet was a finalist for the 2022 Lambda Literary Award for Middle Grade Literature and was a 2023 Charlotte Huck Award honor book. It won the 2023 Mike Morgan & Larry Romans Children's & Young Adult Literature Award and the 2023 Stonewall Children's and Young Adult Literature Award.

== Personal life ==
Wild is a lesbian. She has lived with her wife in Texas, Italy, and Colorado.

Wild has Myalgic encephalomyelitis/chronic fatigue syndrome (ME/CFS) and postural orthostatic tachycardia syndrome (POTS).

== Publications ==
- The Amazing Idea of You. Illustrated by Mary Lundquist. Bloomsbury Publishing. 2019. ISBN 978-1-68119-183-6.
- Love, Violet. Illustrated by Charlene Chua. Farrar, Straus and Giroux. 2021. ISBN 978-0-374-31372-2.
