= Da'Shaun Harrison =

American writer and activist

- Education: Morehouse College
- Occupations: sociologist, essayist
- Writing career
- Subjects: socialism, fat studies, afro-pessimism, transgender studies
- Notable work: Belly of the Beast: The Politics of Anti-Fatness as Anti-Blackness (2021)
- Notable awards: Lambda Literary Award for Transgender Literature (2022)
- Website: dashaunharrison.com

Da'Shaun L. Harrison is a writer, organizer, and abolitionist thinker. Harrison's most notable work is their 2021 book Belly of the Beast: The Politics of Anti-Fatness as Anti-Blackness, for which they won a Lambda Literary Award for Transgender Literature. Harrison identifies as a queer and trans afropessimist and anarcho-communist.

Harrison works through a lens they call "Black fat studies," in conversation with writers like Sabrina Strings, Kiese Laymon, and Joy James. They have lectured at colleges including Harvard Law School, Yale University, Northwestern University, and Spelman College. Harrison has also been featured in Black Power Media, The Takeaway, Rolling Stone, Los Angeles Times, and the ACLU.

== Career ==
Harrison first started community organizing in 2014 as a first-year at Morehouse College in Atlanta. There, they and other students demonstrated against sexual violence, police violence, and gentrification, through AUCShutItDown, Atlanta Black Students United, and ATLisReady. Much of this organizing was in response to the killings of Michael Brown, Alton Sterling, and Philando Castile. In 2017, unable to find a job which would accommodate their disability, Harrison began couch surfing, fundraising, and living in hotel rooms. Between 2019 and 2021, Harrison worked as an editor of Wear Your Voice Magazine.

Since 2021, Harrison has served as the editor-at-large for Scalawag Magazine in Durham. In 2023, they appeared in the Forbes 30 under 30 list. Harrison also co-founded the Movement Media Alliance which houses Media Against Apartheid & Displacement and Communities Beyond Elections.

== Work ==
Harrison has criticized social stigma against fat people, including housing, employment, and healthcare discrimination. They use the term "War on Obesity" to compare the effects of condemning fat bodies to the War on Drugs.

=== Belly of the Beast ===
Harrison was inspired to write Belly of the Beast: The Politics of Anti-Fatness as Anti-Blackness by the Toni Morrison quote "If there is a book that you want to read, but it hasn’t been written yet, then you must write it."

In the book, Harrison advocated liberation from a "Black, queer, disabled, and trans abolitionist" perspective. They said in an interview that anti-fatness is a specific form of racial violence enacted against Black people. In the book, Harrison used terms like "the fat" or "the Black fat" to indicate to readers that Black people or fat people are seen as inhuman objects in our society.

Harrison also detailed the state-sanctioned policing and murders of Black fat men and nonbinary people including Eric Garner, Mike Brown, Tamir Rice, and Walter Scott. Other topics discussed include Desire Capital, the medical-industrial complex, and police abolition.

== Personal life ==
Harrison is based in Atlanta.

Harrison's family is from New York and New Jersey, however they grew up in the South. Their favorite books as a child were the Harry Potter books.
