= Megan Milks =

American writer

Megan Milks is an American writer. They are the author of Kill Marguerite and Other Stories (2014), Margaret and the Mystery of the Missing Body (2021), Slug and Other Stories (2021), and Mega Milk: Essays (2026), as well as the co-editor of Asexualities (2024[2014]) and We Are the Baby-Sitters Club (2021).

Beyond writing, Milks has taught at The New School and Pace University.

They were raised in Chesterfield, Virginia.

== Select writing ==
=== Margaret and the Mystery of the Missing Body (2021) ===
Milks's debut novel, Margaret and the Mystery of the Missing Body, is a literary fiction novel published by Feminist Press in September 2021. The novel follows teenage Margaret, whose relationships with herself and others have gotten more confusing with age. When she had her friends were younger, they used to solve mysteries with the Girls Can Solve Anything club, which Margaret was president of, but they're no longer interested. They also don't notice when Margaret develops an eating disorder so serious that she ends up receiving inpatient treatment. There, she meets new friends and begins to reconnect with herself. The novel deals with mental illness, eating disorders, sexuality orientation, and gender identity.

Margaret and the Mystery of the Missing Body received mixed reviews from critics. In a starred review, Booklist's Courtney Eathorne wrote that "Milks has knocked this coming-of-age meditation out of the park, blending magical realism with tween nostalgia and teen angst, resulting in a totally accurate-feeling account of the chaos of growing up."

Kirkus Reviews described the novel as "Nancy Drew meets The Baby-Sitters Club meets Girl, Interrupted by way of Judith Butler," noting that the story has "a fascinating concept that might have been a terrific novel". They clarified that while the novel includes strong moments of reflection regarding gender and sexuality, "those moments get trampled by distractions like a disembodied brain and a spectral suffragette. The ultimate problem is that the fantastical apparatus doesn't help the reader understand the novel's central character; instead, it pushes the reader further away from understanding." Publishers Weekly similarly noted that the "dynamic, fast-paced novel beams with wonderful insight, even as its various timelines and registers do not always meld into a consonant whole".

Margaret and the Mystery of the Missing Body was a finalist for the 2022 Lambda Literary Award for Transgender Fiction, and Booklist named it one of the years best adult books for young adults.

=== Slug and Other Stories (2021) ===
Slug and Other Stories is a literary fiction collection of short stories published by Feminist Press in November 2021, though many of the stories were originally published in Kill Marguerite and Other Stories (2014). According to Kirkus, who provided a starred review, the collection includes "tender little stories that will make you gasp and squirm".

Kill Marguerite and Other Stories was a finalist for the 2015 Lambda Literary Award for Debut Fiction.

== Publications ==
- Crawford, Marissa; Milks, Megan, eds. (2021). We Are the Baby-Sitters Club: Essays and Artwork from Grown-Up Readers. Chicago Review Press. ISBN 978-1-641-60490-1.
- Milks, Megan (2021). Margaret and the Mystery of the Missing Body. The Feminist Press. ISBN 978-1-952-17780-4.
- Milks, Megan (2021). Slug and Other Stories. The Feminist Press. ISBN 978-1-952-17784-2.
- Cerankowski, KJ; Milks, Megan, eds. (2024) [2014]. Asexualities: Feminist and Queer Perspectives. Routledge. ISBN 978-1-040-03272-5.
- Milks, Megan (2026). Mega Milk: Essays on Family, Fluidity, Whiteness, and Cows. The Feminist Press. ISBN 978-1-558-61358-4.
