= Zeyn Joukhadar =

American novelist

- Education: University of Connecticut (BS); Brown University (PhD)
- Occupation: Writer
- Writing career
- Notable awards: Stonewall Book Award (2021); Lambda Literary Award for Transgender Literature (2021)
- Website: www.zeynjoukhadar.com

Zeyn Joukhadar is a Syrian American writer. Joukhadar is the recipient of the 2021 Stonewall Book Award and Lambda Literary Award for Transgender Fiction for The Thirty Names of Night.

== Biography ==
Zeyn Joukhadar is nonbinary and uses he/him and they/them pronouns. Joukhadar is originally from New York City. Joukhadar holds a bachelor's degree from the University of Connecticut and a PhD in pathobiology from Brown University. Prior to pursuing writing full time, he worked as a biomedical research scientist. His first novel, The Map of Salt and Stars, was published in 2018.

== Published works ==
=== Novels ===
- Joukhadar, Zeyn (2018). The Map of Salt and Stars: A Novel. Atria Books. ISBN 978-1501169038.
- Joukhadar, Zeyn (2020). The Thirty Names of Night: A Novel. Atria Books. ISBN 978-1982121495.

=== Anthology (Fiction) ===
- Joukhadar, Zeyn (2021). "The Voyeurs". In Kwon, R.O.; Greenwell, Garth (eds.). Kink: Stories. Simon & Schuster. ISBN 978-1982110215.
- Joukhadar, Zeyn (2023). "Tiresias". In Northington, Jenn; Williams, S. Zainab (eds.). Fit For the Gods. Vintage. ISBN 9780593469248.

=== Anthology (Non-Fiction) ===
- Joukhadar, Zeyn (2022). "Catching the Light: Reclaiming Opera as a Trans Arab". In Jahshan, Elias (ed.). This Arab Is Queer. Saqi Books. ISBN 978-0863564789.
- Joukhadar, Zeyn (2023). "On Queerness". In Anappara, Deepa; Soomro, Taymour (eds.). Letters to a Writer of Colour. Vintage. ISBN 978-1529115840.
- Joukhadar, Zeyn (2025). “An Incomplete History of Trans Immortality”. In Norris, Denne Michele (ed.). Both/And. HarperOne. ISBN 978-0-06-341437-2.

== Honors and awards ==
=== Won ===
==== The Map of Salt and Stars ====
- 2018 Middle East Book Award - Youth Literature Award

==== The Thirty Names of Night ====
- 2021 Stonewall Book Awards - Barbara Gittings Literature Award
- 2021 Lambda Literary Award - Transgender Fiction

=== Nominated ===
==== The Map of Salt and Stars ====
- 2018 Goodreads Choice Awards finalist - Historical Fiction
- 2018 Goodreads Choice Awards semifinalist - Debut Author
- 2019 Wilbur Smith Adventure Writing Prize shortlist - Best Published Novel

==== Short stories and essays ====
- 2015 Pushcart Prize - "We Will Tell Our Children", first published in Gulf Stream Magazine
- 2020 Pushcart Prize - "Incantations for Unsung Boys", first published in the Columbia Journal
