= All the Flowers Kneeling =

2022 poetry collection by Paul Tran

- Author: Paul Tran
- Series: Penguin Poets
- Publisher: Penguin Books
- Publication date: February 15, 2022
- Pages: 112
- ISBN: 978-0143136842

All the Flowers Kneeling is a 2022 debut poetry collection by American poet Paul Tran, published by Penguin Books for their Penguin Poets series. Its included pieces span topics such as Vietnamese American identity, intergenerational trauma, gender politics, and colonization. The book was a finalist for the 2023 PEN Open Book Award and the Kate Tufts Discovery Award.

== Critical reception ==
The New Yorker included the book in their Best Books of 2022 list.

The New York Times called it "elegantly structured", as well as a "powerful debut, which marshals narrative lyrics and stark beauty ... to address personal and political violence." Later, in August 2022, the magazine included it in its Editors' Choice column. The same month, Victoria Chang selected "Lipstick Elegy" to feature in the magazine, stating it "explores all the distances between mothers and their children, the frayed seams between countries and cultures." The same poem was featured in Literary Hub on the day of the book's release.

The Guardian called the book an "unforgettable collection with careful symmetry". Electric Literature dubbed it "an exquisitely crafted labyrinth of a book". The Poetry Foundation observed "the sometimes excruciating power of these poems". Chang, in the Los Angeles Review of Books, said that "it is successful and thoughtful as a first book" and that "The writing was so strong and powerful at the language level." diaCRITICS, the Diasporic Vietnamese Artists Network's magazine, stated that "As a Vietnamese poet, Tran inherently constructs and tenderly deconstructs how Vietnamese refugee families 'recount and recant' the traumatic past." RHINO Poetry said "These poems feel necessary, as all truths are necessary. More than that, they are also beautiful in the way that only art can be simultaneously beautiful and horrific and true." Madeleine Cravens, in Ploughshares, noted "Tran's command of the poetic line" and lauded their vast and complex exploration of trauma.
