= Paul Tran =

American poet

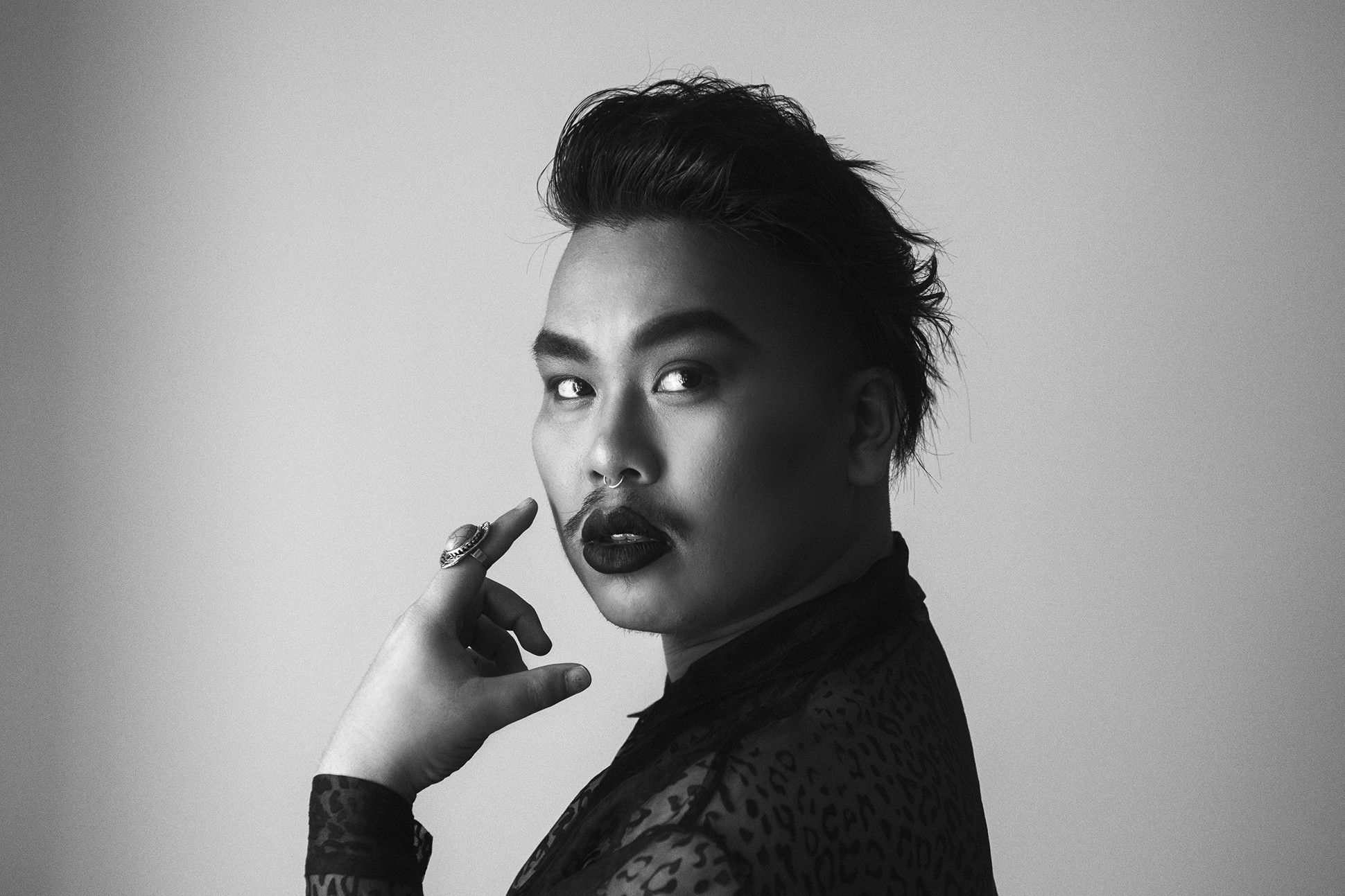

Paul Tran is an American poet.

== Early life and education ==
Tran is a child of Vietnamese refugees.

They have a Bachelor's degree from Brown University and a Master of Fine Arts from Washington University.

== Work ==
Tran survived childhood abuse by family and rape when in college. Their debut poem collection, All the Flowers Kneeling (2022), explores being a survivor and is based on their experience with sexual violence and the experience by women in the family during the wars in Vietnam. All the Flowers Kneeling was a 2022 New York Times Book Review Editors' Choice Pick and 2023 PEN Open Book Award finalist.

In 2018, Tran won the Discovery/Boston Review Poetry Prize and was awarded the Poetry Foundation's Ruth Lilly and Dorothy Sargent Rosenberg Poetry Fellowship.

Tran was a 2020-2022 Wallace Stegner Fellow in Poetry at Stanford University and a Visiting Fellow in Poetry at Pacific University. They are an Editor-At-Large at The Offing.

As of 2023, they are an Assistant Professor of English and Asian American Studies at the University of Wisconsin-Madison.
