= Aisha Sabatini Sloan =

American writer

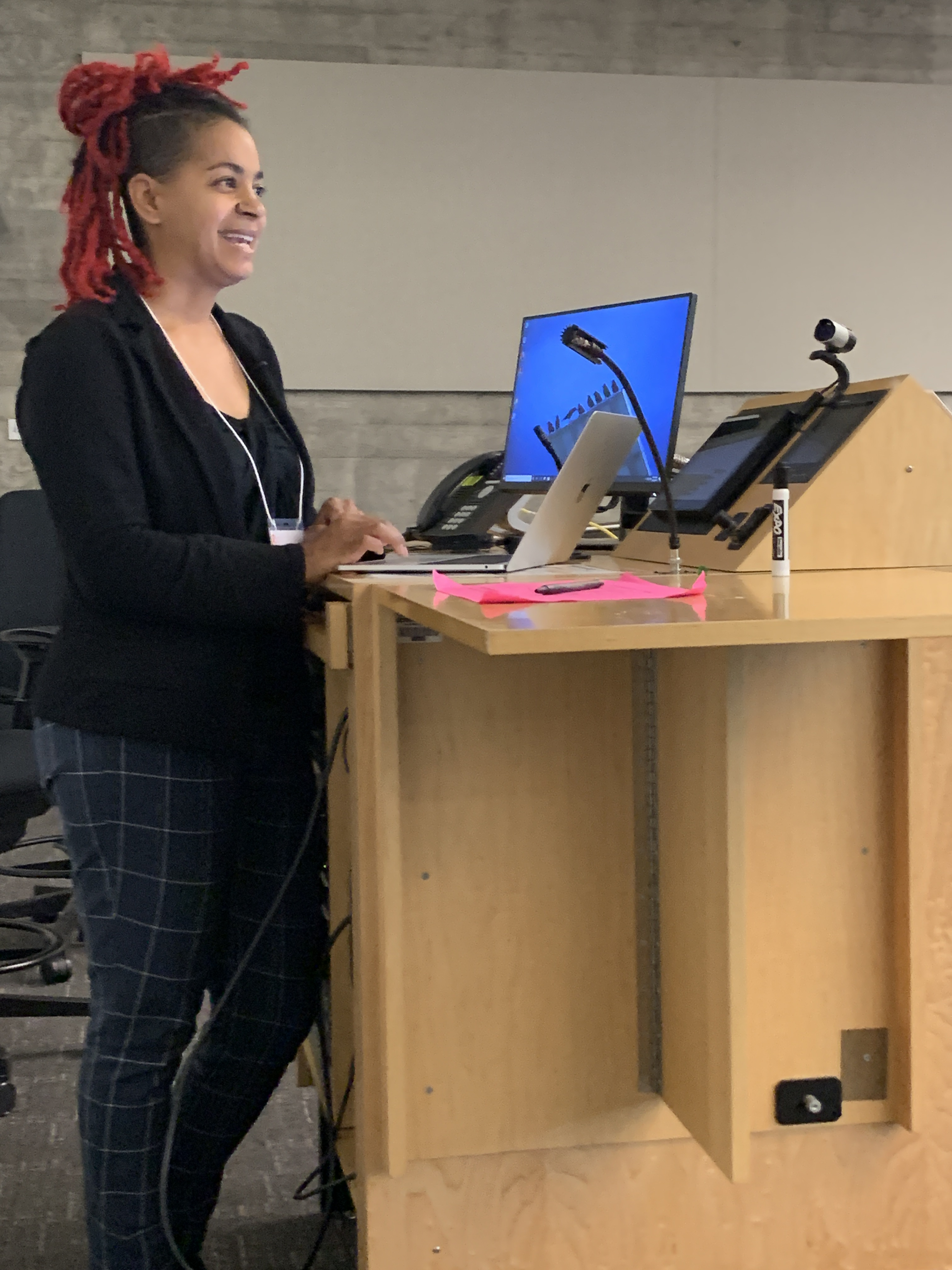
- Aisha Sabatini Sloan presenting at &NOW conference, Sept 2019
- Born: Los Angeles
- Education: Carleton College (BA); Gallatin School of Individualized Study (MA); University of Arizona (MFA)
- Occupation: Writer
- Writing career
- Notable awards: Lambda Literary Award for Bisexual Nonfiction

Aisha Sabatini Sloan is an American writer who was born and raised in Los Angeles. Her writing about race and current events is often coupled with analysis of art, film, and pop culture. She studied English literature at Carleton College and went on to earn an MA in Cultural Studies and Studio Art from the Gallatin School of Individualized Study at NYU and an MFA in Creative Nonfiction from the University of Arizona. Her essay collection, The Fluency of Light: Coming of Age in a Theater of Black and White was published by the University of Iowa Press in 2013. Her essay collection, Dreaming of Ramadi in Detroit, was published in 2017 and chosen by Maggie Nelson as the winner of the 1913 Open Prose Contest. Her 2021 essay, Borealis, received the 2022 Lambda Literary Award for Bisexual Nonfiction.

== Professional life ==
Sloan has written several reviews, essays, and books about race and various current events. She won the 1913 Open Prose Contest in 2016 for her most recent book, Dreaming of Ramadi in Detroit (2017). She is also a Pushcart Prize nominee as a finalist for Write-a-House in 2014 and the Disquiet Literary Prize in 2015. Her work has been featured in Best American Nonrequired Reading and Best American Essays. Sloan worked with publicist Kima Jones during the launch of Dreaming of Ramadi, a partnership that she funded via a crowd-sourced Indiegogo campaign.

She has taught courses in composition, literature, and creative writing for Pima Community College, the University of Arizona, Carleton College, the University of Michigan's New England Literature Program, and the University of Arizona Poetry Center. Currently, Sloan is a visiting professor in Creative Nonfiction in the Helen Zell Writers' Program at the University of Michigan.

With Karl Ove Knausgård and Wayne Koestenbaum, Sloan delivered a keynote address at the NonfictioNOW conference in Reykjavik, Iceland, in June 2017. She also acted as a literary judge for the 2019 PEN/Diamonstein-Spielvogel Award for the Art of the Essay.

== Writing career ==
Sloan's essays are included in the anthologies: Dear America (Trinity University Press), Trespass: Ecotone Essayists Beyond the Boundaries of Place, Identity, and Feminism (Lookout Books, 2019), Truth to Power (Cutthroat, 2017), How We Speak to One Another (Coffee House Press, 2017), The Sonoran Desert: A Literary Field Guide (University of Arizona Press, 2016) and Writing as Revision (Pearson Press, 2011). Her work has been named notable for the Best American Non-Required Reading and Best American Essays anthologies (2011).

In 2020 she was awarded a Creative Writing Fellowship from the National Endowment for the Arts.

She is the recipient of the 2025 Whiting Award in Non-fiction.

== Reception and analysis ==
Kate Schapira, Pank Magazine, reviewing The Fluency of Light (2013):

"Many essays in the collection are more intimate: with anger and image, music and grief, they mediate the smaller but similarly absorbing complexities of family. Mishearing, misunderstanding, selfishness, illness, and stress; economic segregation, environmental injustice, systematic incarceration; the "something fragile" that composes walls, floor, the ceiling that falls in chunks while the author and her father await her mother's arrival; the flickerings of gentleness and love. I want to press my eye, my ear, to the pieces that don't unify or homogenize but do call to each other, to the leak where things can leave or enter."

About her most recent book, essayist and cultural critic Kiese Laymon wrote:

"Dreaming of Ramadi in Detroit is an otherworldly meditation on the elasticity of memory, the liveliness of blackness and possibilities of the essay. Aisha Sabatini Sloan manages to produce a collection of essays that are at once innovative, inspiring, sobering, and absolutely terrifying while daring every other essayist in the country to catch up."

== Bibliography ==
=== Books ===
- The Fluency of Light: Coming of Age in a Theatre of Black and White (2013)
- Dreaming of Ramadi in Detroit (2017)

=== Essays ===
- "On Haunting" from The Paris Review
- "A Clear Presence" on Guernica
- "Birth of the Cool" on Identity Theory
- "Dreaming of Ramadi in Detroit" on The Offing
- "On Basquiat, the Black Body, and a Strange Sensation in my Neck" on The Paris Review
- "Caldera" on Sublevel
- "D is for the Dance of the Hours: A Portrait of Pre-Bankruptcy Detroit" (excerpt on Catapult)
- "Lost and Found: Tisa Bryant's Unexplained Presence" on the Tin House Open Bar Blog
- "On Collage, Chris Kraus, and Misremembered Didion" on Essay Daily
- "The Dangerous Lure of Writing for White Readers in an MFA" adapted from NonfictioNOW keynote in Reykjavik, Iceland, June 2017 on LitHub
- "Borealis" (Coffee House Press, 2021)

=== Reviews ===
- "Calamities" by Renee Gladman
- "CalArts launches L.A.'s newest, nonconformist literary magazine" by Agatha French
