= Trans Bodies, Trans Selves =

2014 non-fiction book

Trans Bodies, Trans Selves: A Resource for the Transgender Community
- Editor: Laura Erickson-Schroth
- Language: English
- Subject: Transgender health and wellness
- Published: 2014
- Publisher: Oxford University Press
- Publication place: United States
- Pages: 649
- ISBN: 9780199325351
- OCLC: 860943941
- Website: http://transbodies.com

Trans Bodies, Trans Selves: A Resource for the Transgender Community is a 2014 non-fiction book published by Oxford University Press about wellness for transgender and gender non-conforming people edited by psychiatrist Laura Erickson-Schroth. It was a 27th Lambda Literary Awards finalist in the Transgender Nonfiction category and won a 2015 Achievement Award from GLMA: Healthcare Professionals for LGBT Equality. A second edition, with the new subtitle A Resource by and for Transgender Communities, was published in 2022.

== Production ==
The project was inspired by the women's health book Our Bodies, Ourselves. Editor Laura Erickson-Schroth explained that both books had similar motivations. She understood that Our Bodies, Ourselves arose when a group of women felt their medical system, composed of mostly men, was not working for them. The women created Our Bodies, Ourselves as a medical manual on topics like abortion, rape, and sexuality. Erickson-Schroth worked in psychiatry and LGBT healthcare, and noticed that many transgender patients she met with in medical school had likewise felt underserved and misunderstood by their medical providers. She wanted to help compile a book that was written by and for trans people so the community could share information with each other in the same way that Our Bodies, Ourselves had.

The editor put out a call for submissions in 2011. Each section was written under the guidance of expert advisors. The foreword is by author Jennifer Finney Boylan.

== Contents ==
Trans Bodies, Trans Selves has over 600 pages organized in eight sections.

Six chapters cover various topics relating to trans topics:

- trans identity and intersectional, personal experiences
- social experiences, employment, and legal issues
- physical and mental health, medical transition
- relationships, intimacy, sexuality, parenting
- aging, lifestages from childhood to elderhood
- sociopolitics of transness in the U.S.

Sections on media and global leaders are interspersed throughout other chapters, and the book includes hundreds of short stories and art pieces. The authors also include the results of a global survey of trans communities and lists of resources and references. Every chapter includes guides for people dealing with situations or looking for recommendations on various topics covered in the book.

The authors of Our Bodies, Ourselves wrote the afterword to Trans Bodies, Trans Selves.

== Reception ==
Trans Bodies, Trans Selves won a 2015 Achievement Award from GLMA: Healthcare Professionals for LGBT Equality. The book was a finalist for the 2015 Lambda Literary Award for Transgender Nonfiction.

The book received positive reviews from the gender and sexuality scholar Cael M. Keegan in Genders, the children's book author Kyle Lukoff in the American Library Association's GLBT Reviews blog, and the medical doctor Henry H. Ng in LGBT Health. Daniel K. Phillip, reviewing in the journal Psychology of Sexual Orientation and Gender Diversity, cited it as the first comprehensive published resource by and for trans people on trans topics. Phillip valued the diversity of perspectives and representation of intersectional experiences, but said that the second chapter's dated view of race theory contradicted definitions from chapter six. Phillip also appreciated the lists of practical resources and the perspectives of so many trans people included in the book. For the Journal of Sex & Marital Therapy Margaret Nichols praised the book as an educational and reference resource, calling it a classic like Our Bodies, Ourselves.

It also received positive coverage in the mainstream press. Jessica Grose wrote in New Republic that the anthology is "brimming with straightforward information about living a life as a gender-nonconforming person in the United States." It was named to several top-ten lists for 2014.
