= Ely Shipley =

American poet

- Education: Purdue University (MFA); University of Utah (PhD)
- Occupations: Author; poet

Ely Shipley is an American author and poet who has been featured in multiple literary journals. He has additionally published his own works and has received several awards for those works.

== Biography ==
Ely Shipley received an MFA from Purdue University and a PhD from the University of Utah. He is currently a professor at Western Washington University. He was previously an assistant professor at Baruch College.

== Awards and appearances ==
Ely Shipley has been nominated and received several awards for his publications. For Boy with Flowers, published by The Barrow Street Press in 2008, he won the Barrow Street Press book prize. He also won the 2009 Thom Gunn Award and several prizes from different publications. He was a finalist for the Lambda Literary Award for Boy with Flowers. He has also received the Western Humanities Review Award in Poetry from the Prairie Schooner for his works. He has been featured at multiple events, including at Cornell University and Stanford University.

== Publications ==
=== Poetry ===
- Boy with Flowers (2008)
- On Beards: A Memoir of Passing (2015)
- Some Animal (2018)
