= Videofag =

Arts organization in Toronto, Canada

Videofag was a storefront arts space that operated in the Kensington Market neighbourhood of Toronto, Ontario from 2012 to 2016. Founded and run by couple William Ellis and Jordan Tannahill, who converted it from an old barbershop, the space became an influential hub for queer counterculture in the city. A flexible multimedia space, Videofag was designed to serve as a cinema, art gallery, nightclub or theatre space depending on the needs of any individual event. It also doubled as Ellis and Tannahill's home. Videofag often acted as a laboratory, in which artists were gifted residencies to explore new ideas. The space helped develop and premiere several shows that went on to high-profile presentations at major theatres and festivals internationally.

== History ==
Videofag's inaugural exhibition, in 2012, was a retrospective of local queer music collective Kids on TV. That year, the space also presented performances by Jeremy Bailey, Casey Mecija, Nina Arsenault, as well as Salvatore Antonio and Adamo Ruggiero's Truth/Dare: A Satire (With Dance), a Madonna tribute show. Screenings included video work by Mike Hoolboom, John Greyson, Matthew Rankin, Adam Garnet Jones, Albert Shin, and The Hidden Cameras.

Performances presented in 2013 included Henri Fabergé's six-hour rock opera Feint of Hart, Aurora Stewart de Peña's play The Lee Press On Nail Play, Jane Montgomery Griffiths' play Sappho...In 9 Fragments, Daniel Karasik's play The Biographer, a concert by Rae Spoon, Sky Gilbert's play To Myself at 28, Zach Russell's Grindr comi-drama Fixed, a double-bill of solo plays Tenderpits and Revenge of the Popinjay by AnimalParts, poetry performances by bill bissett, and a trilogy of dance pieces by D.A. Hoskins. Videofag also premiered Sheila Heti's play All Our Happy Days Are Stupid, the subject of her bestselling novel How Should a Person Be?, featuring a cast of fourteen mostly non-actors from Toronto's literary, music, comedy, and visual art scenes. The play later enjoyed sold-out runs at Toronto's Harbourfront Centre and New York City's The Kitchen. That year, Videofag also hosted exhibitions by Vivek Shraya, Keith Cole, and Jesi the Elder, and group shows featuring work by Bridget Moser, Life of a Craphead, FASTWÜRMS, Kalup Linzy, Will Munro, and R.M. Vaughan, among others. One notable exhibition saw Videofag transformed into a satirical Wal-Mart pop-up store, in response to the bargain chain's announced intention to build an outlet in Kensington Market. Screenings and new media projects included those by Jennifer Chan (artist), Daniel Cockburn, Jon Moritsugu, Francesco Gagliardi, the Radical Faeries and Sissy Boy YouTube Night, a program of Internet videos of childhood queer expression, curated by Jon Davies.

2014 saw Videofag presenting work by performance artist Narcissister, choreographer Andrew Tay, performance artist Jess Dobkin, artist Humboldt Magnussen, writer Jacob Wren, a gothic rock-opera by G.B. Jones and Caroline Azar of Fifth Column, an exhibition of Erik Kostiuk William's Hungry Bottom Comics, and the Queer Songbook Orchestra, in which a 12-piece chamber ensemble re-interpreted songs that have shaped the LGBTQ community. Videofag also played host to the Regional Support Network, a monthly screening series featuring film and video from specific communities, curated by filmmakers from those communities. Photographer Samra Habib’s exhibition ‘Just Me & Allah: Photographs of Queer Muslims’ garnered international media attention. ‘Homer’s Odyssey’, an exhibition exploring the cultural impact of The Simpsons on a generation of visual artists, also drew record crowds and significant press attention. Videofag's 2014 artists in residence included performance artist Michael Dudeck, visual artist Sojourner Truth-Parsons, and theatre creator Stewart Legere.

Among Videofag's 2015 highlights were premieres of Karen Hines's play Crawlspace, and Greg MacArthur's play A Man Vanishes, a noir-thriller set at Videofag, and starring Tannahill and Ellis as themselves. The space also played host to exhibitions, performances, and residencies by dancer-choreographer Amanda Acorn, performance artist Alvis Choi, the post-punk band New Fries, director Alistair Newton, writer-artist Masha Tupitsyn, curator Xenia Benivolski, playwright Johnnie McNamara Walker, writer Michael V. Smith, artist Rajni Perera, drag queen Nancy Babcock, performance-maker Chad Dembski, and dancer-choreographer Dana Michel, among others.

In 2016, Videofag presented work by musician Lido Pimienta, playwright-performer Haley McGee, poet Aisha Sasha John, theatre makers ted witzel and Susanna Fournier, artist Walter Scott, and premiered playwright Salvatore Antonio's play Sheets.

Videofag presented a number of political cabarets on subjects including Canadian Minister of Citizenship and Immigration Jason Kenney, the Sochi 2014 Olympics and Yoko Ono. Every month Videofag also hosted The Spoke, a storytelling event presented by Toronto theatre company Outside the March. Videofag collaborated with a number of larger festivals and organizations to co-present events, including the Art Gallery of Ontario, Pleasure Dome, Inside Out Film and Video Festival, Buddies in Bad Times, and Theatre Passe Muraille.

Videofag closed in June 2016. In November 2017, BookThug released The Videofag Book, a collection of essays, photos, scripts, and reflections about the space.

== Awards and recognition ==
Videofag was listed as one of Toronto's Best New Art Galleries of 2012 and nominated as a Toronto Hero as part of the Torontoist's 2013 Heroes and Villains poll. Following its closure in June 2016, the organization received an honorary award from The Toronto Critic's Awards for its contribution to the community.
