= Edgy Women =

Annual festival

Edgy Women Festival
- Genre: Arts Festival
- Dates: On or around March 8th, International Women’s Day
- Locations: Montreal, Canada
- Years active: 1994 - 2016 (23 years)
- Founded: 1994
- Website: edgywomen.ca

The Edgy Women Festival (also referred to as Edgy Redux, Femmes Au-delà or Women from the Edge) was an annual festival of "short, highly physical works by women, often characterized by a transdisciplinary approach and politicized content." which ran for 23 years from 1994 to 2016. Presented by Studio 303, a dance and interdisciplinary-arts centre in Montreal, Quebec, Canada, Edgy Women focuses on feminist perspectives with workshops and forums, performance events, and socializing. Studio 303's artistic and general manager Miriam Ginestier programmed Edgy Women from 1995 to 2014.

== Origins & History ==
Edgy originated in 1994 when dancer, choreographer, and Performance Mix-producer Karen Bernard from New York City came to Studio 303 with 2 other artists to present a shared program. Bernard called this first program "Women from the Edge' but Ginestier changed the name to 'Edgy Women' for the next iteration.

=== Early years ===
1994 - 2005: 1 night event, expanded to 4 nights.

2001: 10 pieces, 2 days. Artists from NYC and Montreal included Alexis O’Hara, Women With Kitchen Appliances (Veg-Omatic) and Marie Brassard (Jimmy, Creature De Reve)

=== 2005 - 2012 ===
2005: featured (among others) Nathalie Claude, Dayna McLeod and Alexis O'Hara, expanded to three venues to accommodate visiting all-woman art band, Les Reines Prochaines from Switzerland. Canadian Heritage provided the funding that helped Edgy grow to a 1 week event as well as add performers from outside of Quebec.

2006: Edgy officially became a festival of 10 days to three weeks after Canada Council, Inter-Arts office provided festival funding for 2 years.

2009: Jess Dobkin - Being Green

2011: Annie Sprinkle & Beth Stephens - Adventures of the Love Art Lab.

=== 2013: 20th Anniversary - Theme: Art / Sport / Gender ===
Cassils - Becoming An Image

Edgy Lucha featuring professional female wrestlers

=== 2014 - 2016: Edgy Redux ===
2016: Edgy: The End (final edition)

“Edgy: The End included an obituary (honouring the 500+ artists involved), a memorial service (where I selected video archives to screen and offered live commentary during Montreal’s Nuit Blanche), and a funeral cabaret-wake where the co-hosts Nathalie Claude and Dayna McLeod took the audience through the five stages of grief. It was an amazing finale.” - Miriam Ginestier, former artistic director

=== Partner Venues ===
2005: La Sala Rossa

2009: Tangente

2013: Blue Cat Boxing Club

2016: Lion d’Or cabaret

== People ==
=== Artists ===
Dayna Mcleod (performance & video artist / curator) - 10x, Alexis O'Hara (spoken word / sound / performance artist) - 10x, Nathalie Claude (theatre artist / clown) - 9x, Karen Bernard (dancer / choreographer) - 9x, Tonija Livingstone - 6x, Jess Dobkin (performance artist) - 4x, Karen Sherman - 4x, Lamathilde (video artist), Marie Brassard (theatre artist), Céline Bonnier (actress), Coral Short (performance artist), Les Fermières Obsédées (Quebec City), Jennifer Miller (USA), Mirha-Soleil Ross, Edwige Jean-Pierre.

=== Curators and Artistic Directors ===
1994: Karen Bernard & Paul Caskey

1995 - 2013: Miriam Ginestier

2014: Miriam Ginestier & Andrea Joy Rideout

2015 & 2016: Andrea Joy Rideout

== Funding & Closure ==
In 2006 festival funding was secured via the Inter-arts office at the Canada Council. This lasted only 2 years due to eligibility criteria and changing programs. Over the years, funding ranged from $0 to $20,000. In 2013 when Studio 303 lost its Canadian Heritage funding, Edgy was reduced down to 3 events and renamed Edgy Redux until its final season in 2016. There is speculation that this massive loss of funding was due to the Conservative government targeting organizations that specialized in working with women, queer and racialized artists.

== Ethos & Curatorial Approach ==
Despite the name, Edgy Women was not gender exclusive, neither to audiences nor performers. Although infrequent, it was not unheard of to see either cis and trans male performers on the line up. Regarding her curatorial approach to the festival, Ginestier has said, “I was actively seeking weirdness, stuff that’s subversive, or a bit controversial, that might upset some people.” Queer-feminist artist, activist and scholar, T.L. Cowan says, “There was a sexual culture that was central to the aesthetics, the audience energy, and to the commitment both to provocation and safety.”

Theatre artist, scholar and Hysteria: A Festival of Women curator, Moynan King has said, “I think there’s an element of camp, for sure. There’s also an element of disidentification (Muñoz) in a way, like an awareness that sometimes we’re reclaiming and reconfiguring our own phobic stereotypes. It’s a way of inhabiting history, maybe, or having a history?”

Cowan described similarities in the multidisciplinary, cabaret-focused approach taken by Edgy, Hysteria and Counting Past 2, a Toronto trans arts festival created by Mirha-Soleil Ross. King and Cowan agreed that each festival pushed against the perception that work by marginalized artists, such as women and trans performers, didn't exist.

== Legacy & Influence ==
According to Montreal Gazette journalist Victor Swoboda, “Edgy’s provocative feminist and gender-bending performances have helped define Montreal as an open-minded, inquisitive arts town” and may have helped launch the career of Dana Michel with an early solo at the 2006 edition.

Edgy collaborated often, intimately and aesthetically with Moynan King’s Hysteria: A Festival of Women from 2003 - 2009.

Ginestier once took Edgy artists to Ljubljiana, Slovenia to perform in The City of Women festival. The creative kinship was strong but the inter-continental logistics were too prohibitive to subsequent collaborations.

Edgy is mentioned as one of Canada’s few LGBT2Q performance festivals in Paul J. Halferty’s 2014 journal article for Theatre Research in Canada.

In June 2016, Karen Bernard invited Miriam Ginestier to curate the event “EDGY NYC + MTL” In honour of the 30th anniversary of Performance Mix Festival produced by New Dance Alliance at Abrons Art Centre in New York City.
