= Hysteria: A Festival of Women =

Hysteria: A Festival of Women was a recurring arts festival in Toronto. It was founded in 2003 by Moynan King of the Buddies in Bad Times theatre company in collaboration with Nightwood Theatre.

Over a ten-day period, Buddies hosted a succession of events particularly for and with the queer women's performance community, including art, installations to dance, film, music, spoken word and theatre.

Hysteria debuted such Buddies in Times' productions as Kinstonia: Dialect Perverso by Ann Holloway, The Scandelles’s Under the Mink (2007), organ-eye-zed crime (2006) by d’bi young, The Salon Automaton: A play for three automatons and one flesh and blood actress (2009) by Nathalie Claude, and The Beauty Salon (2008). By its third edition, the festival featured work by nearly one hundred women.

== Namesake ==
The festival name alludes ironically to female hysteria, an archaic medical diagnosis applied to women the 19th and early 20th centuries. The festival's name is about embracing women's disobedience and reclaiming the term hysteria.

== Collaborations ==
During Hysteria's years of existence, the festival shared some artists, as well as aesthetic curatorial-social-political sensibilities with Montreal's Edgy Women festival. Hysteria, Edgy, and the Counting Past 2 trans arts festival shared similar transdisciplinary approaches to building communities around marginalized artists.

== Hysteria after 2009 ==
2009 was a year marked by an increase in the production of women's theatre works at Buddies in Bad Times, in large part due to the publication of an Arts report by Canada Council for the Arts, entitled, "Adding it Up: The Status of Women in Canadian Theatre," which showed the vast majority of plays appearing on Canadian stage coming from male playwrights. following this season, however, a shift occurred in the programming, beginning with the decision not to renew King's contract as artistic associate which led to the festival's subsequent cessation.

Since then, Strange Sisters has been revived, a one-night festival of queer women's work. In 2015, it was renamed Insatiable Sisters by co-curators Kim Katrin Crosby and Gein Wong. Insatiable Sisters highlights new performance works of queer womyn and trans* folks.
