= La Centrale =

Coordinates: 45.5187°N 73.5835°W

La Centrale galerie Powerhouse is an artist-run space in Montreal, Quebec, Canada, founded in 1973. For decades, it was known as the city's only feminist art gallery.

== History ==
The idea for the gallery grew out of a consciousness-raising group that met on a routine basis at a crafts store, Flaming Apron, in the Notre-Dame-de-Grâce neighbourhood. The original founders were Elizabeth Bertoldi, Leslie Busch, Isobel Dowler-Gow, Margaret Griffin, Clara Gutshe, Billie-Joe Mericle, Stasje Plantenga and Pat Walsh. In 1973 it held its first show, in a rented space on Greene Avenue. The show included an installation by Margaret Griffin that had live goldfish in a sink, and a "kitsch corner" by Pat Walsh and Clara Gutsche that had floral-print wallpaper and a table with a family photo.

One of the goals of the original mandate for the gallery was to address the under representation of women artists in Québécoise, Canadian, and art international institutions and exhibitions.

In 2007, La Centrale expanded their mandate to reflect changes in feminism as well as address the implications of post-colonialism and transfeminism. This new mandate also included no longer restricting the gallery as a women-only space.

"GENDER ALARM! Nouveaux féminismes en art actuel" was a series of events that marked the one-year anniversary of La Centrale's new mandate, and included an exhibition with work by Lynne Chan, Jacinthe Loranger, Will Munro, Noam Lapid, Fereshteh Toosi, Emily Laliberté, Anthea Black, Arwa Abouon, Insoon Ha and The After Party; a performance event with works by d'bi Young, Mike Hickey, Trish Salah, Insoon Ha, Dayna McLeod and Coral Short; a film and video screening with works by Lisa Steele, Martha Rosler, Annie Brunette, Mirha-Soleil Ross & Mark Karbusicky, Les Reines prochaines, and Alanis Obomsawin; walking tour of feminist art galleries and spaces in Montreal led by Erin Silver, as well as a workshops that looked at how feminist organizations can successfully navigate a transition from women-only spaces to inclusive spaces led by Denise Brown from the Leeway Foundation, and gendered language use in French and English led by Susanne de Lotbinière-Harwood.

The gallery has moved many times, with locations on St. Dominique St. and Sainte-Catherine Street. It is now located on Saint Laurent Boulevard.

A variety of media have been represented, but installation art and performance art have been common in the gallery's exhibits, and frequent themes are motherhood, identity, activism, gender, and community.
