= Queer Pride Inside =

2020 Canadian television special

Queer Pride Inside is a Canadian television special that aired June 24, 2020 on CBC Gem. Created by CBC Arts and Buddies in Bad Times as a response to the cancellation of Pride Toronto during the COVID-19 pandemic in Canada, it presented a video cabaret of performances by LGBTQ-identified Canadian musicians, actors and drag artists.

The special was hosted by Elvira Kurt, and featured performances by Beverly Glenn-Copeland, Teiya Kasahara, Yovska, Ivan Coyote, Les Femmes Fatales, Gay Jesus, Cris Derksen, Luna DuBois, Pearle Harbour, Tawiah M'carthy, Stewart Legere, Alexis O'Hara, Trey Anthony and Ryan G. Hinds.

The special received a Canadian Screen Award nomination for Best Variety or Entertainment Special at the 9th Canadian Screen Awards in 2021.
