= Dayna McLeod =

Dayna McLeod (born 1972) is a Montreal based performance artist and video artist whose work often includes topics of feminism, queer identity, and sexuality.

She has a Diploma in Sculpture from the Alberta College of Art and Design, an M.F.A. in Open Media from Concordia University, and a Ph.D in Humanities at The Centre for Interdisciplinary Studies in Society and Culture at Concordia University.

== Career ==
A regular performer at Montreal's Kiss My Cabaret, Meow Mix, Le Boudoir, and Edgy Women Festival, McLeod's work utilizes performance-based, remix and cabaret and practices.

She has performed in ten annual editions of the Edgy Women Festival and her work has been shown internationally. One of her notable works was her "cougar for a year" project, in which she dressed in animal print from June 1, 2012, to June 1, 2013. "Cougar for a year" won La Centrale's 2014 Prix Powerhouse for her radical honesty and courage in the face of normalization in our culture. Dayna has also won numerous other awards, and has received funding for video projects from the Canada Council and the Conseil des arts et des lettres du Québec.

Her body often figures prominently in her performances, such as Uterine Concert Hall an in-situ, sound performance where audience members were invited to listen through her uterus via stethoscope to music and soundscapes played from a speaker inserted into her vagina, and Cougar For a Year in which she wore animal print clothing for an entire year, 24/7 to "[focus] on a public examination of the female body, especially an older woman’s body in a cultural space where this body has somehow become public property ripe for commentary".

McLeod is also a video maker, utilizing performance-based practices where she performs directly for the camera, often combining this technique with remix practices, such as in Ultimate SUB Ultimate DOM: Maria Von Trapp & Mary Poppins and That's Right Diana Barry- You Needed Me.

== Works ==
Performance Art

- 2016 - Uterine Concert Hall, Darling Foundry
- 2016 - What’s in the Box?, La Chapelle Theatre, Montreal
- 2015 - Santa’s Wife and The Baby Dyke, Centaur Theatre, Montreal
- 2015 - Live For Menopause
- 2014 - Bronze Cowboy
- 2012 - Cougar For a Year
- 2009 - AV Machine collaboration with Alexis O’Hara
- 2008 - Come Shred My Heart
- 2007 - Monarchy Mama
- 2007 - Car Wash!, La Centrale, Montreal
- 2004 - Sex Accidents and Home Repair, Studio 303, Montreal
- 2004 - The One: a collaboration, collaboration with Jackie Gallant, Studio 303, Montreal
- 2003 - Feminism: Your body is revolting
- 2001 - Tales From the Canadian Beaver trilogy (Oh Canada, Show us Your Beaver; Beaver Fever; Santa Beaver)

Videos

- 2015 - Undercover Lesbian SUPERCUT (Rizzoli & Isles S1.E6)
- 2015 - Older Woman Gentlemanly Dating with a Lesbian Ending SUPERCUT (Psych S5.E4)
- 2015 - Class Action Baby Supercut (The Good Wife S1.E17)
- 2014 - The Woman Who Paints in Blood Anti-Aging SUPERCUT
- 2014 - Creep, collaboration with Jackie Gallant
- 2011 - Nothing Compares to You
- 2011 - Don't Ask Don't Tell Gay, Gay, Gay
- 2011 - Peptalk.
- 2011 - Breaking up with Stephen Harper
- 2010 - The Cremation of Sam McGee
- 2010 - Thong
- 2009 - Ultimate SUB Ultimate DOM: Maria Von Trapp & Mary Poppins
- 2009 - That's Right Diana Barry- You Needed Me
- 2009 - Teabagging and Other Beauty Secrets
- 2009 - The Secret Message Tapes
- 2005 - Pleasure Zone
- 2004 - Dad, Don’t be Mad
- 2002 - Master Libation
- 2001 - Watching Lesbian Porn
- 2000 - The Bathroom Tapes: Track 3; Take 4 ("My Man")
- 1999 - How to Fake an Orgasm (whether you need to or not)
