= Miriam Ginestier =

Canadian artist

Miriam Ginestier (born 1968) is a Canadian interdisciplinary performance curator living and working in Montreal, Quebec. She is best known for her work as general and artistic director of Studio 303, Montreal's dance and interdisciplinary-arts centre. Between 1993 and 1995, Miriam Ginestier co-founded the feminist experimental performance festival Edgy Women in collaboration with Karen Bernard and Paul Caskey.

Miriam has contributed to the Montreal creative community through her artist-driven approach to curation and production. Along with public activities and performances, Ginestier's events have sought to create a community where people of various backgrounds can meet and share viewpoints, and have brought together various forms of feminism. Her work as a freelance cultural event organiser for the lesbian community earned her the Arc-en-Ciel Award in 2003 for her contribution to the community. She was also responsible for the lesbian monthly dance party, Meow Mix, where she DJed as well.

== Works ==
=== Curation ===
- 1994 - 2016: Edgy Women Festival
- 1994 - 2006: Le Boudoir Cabaret
- 1997 - 2012: Meow Mix Cabaret
- 2012 - ongoing: Cabaret Tollé
- 2016 - ongoing: Queer Performance Camp
