= Tawiah M'carthy =

Canadian writer and actor

Tawiah M'Carthy
- Born: Accra, Ghana
- Occupations: theatre artist; actor, playwright, director, creator
- Writing career
- Period: 2008-present
- Notable work: Obaaberima

Tawiah Ben M'Carthy is a Ghanaian-born Canadian actor and playwright. He is best known for his 2012 play Obaaberima, a one-man play about growing up gay in Ghana.

== Biography ==
Born in Accra, Ghana, M'Carthy moved to Canada at the age of 14, living first in Merritt, British Columbia and later in Scarborough, Ontario. He studied theatre at York University, writing his first play The Kente Cloth and staging it at Toronto's SummerWorks festival during this time. Obaaberima had its roots in a poem that he submitted to the Young Creators Unit at Buddies in Bad Times theatre. The play premiered at Buddies in September 2012, under the direction of Evalyn Parry.

He garnered two Dora Mavor Moore Award nominations for Obaaberima in 2013, for both Outstanding New Play and Outstanding Performance by a Male in a Principal Role – Play, amid five other nominations for the play. The show won three other Dora Awards, including Outstanding Production of a Play.

In 2014, his plays Blue Bird, cowritten with Brad Cook, and Black Boys with Saga Collectif premiered as workshop productions.

He has also acted in other plays, including productions of Mart Crowley's The Boys in the Band, Kwame Stephens' Man 2 Man, Lanford Wilson's Balm in Gilead, D. D. Kugler and William Shakespeare's Love's Labour's Lost, A Midsummer Night's Dream and Macbeth, and in Maxime Desmons' short film Au plus proche.

He was part of the 2014–2015 English Theatre Ensemble at the National Arts Centre, and has also worked with Toronto's Tarragon Theatre and Obsidian Theatre companies.

In 2016, he was cocreator with Thomas Antony Olajide and Stephen Jackman-Torkoff of Black Boys, a theatrical show about Black Canadian LGBTQ identities which premiered at Buddies in Bad Times before undertaking a national tour. Olajide, M'carthy and Jackman-Torkoff were collectively nominated for Outstanding Ensemble Performance at the Dora Mavor Moore Awards in 2017.

In 2018, he performed a revival of Obaaberima at Buddies in Bad Times.

In June 2020, M'carthy performed an excerpt from Obaaberima as part of the Buddies in Bad Times Queer Pride Inside special for CBC Gem. In 2021, he performed on FreeUp! The Emancipation Day Special.
