= Keith Cole (performance artist) =

Canadian artist

Keith Cole is a queer Canadian performance artist and political activist. Originally from Thunder Bay, Ontario, he is currently based in Toronto, Ontario. An alumnus of York University's Fine Arts program, Cole has worked in film and video, dance and theatre performance, both as himself and in character as drag queen Pepper Highway.

He has produced and hosted live events in Toronto, including Porn-a-Roake, a comedic event which blended karaoke performances with amateur porn videos, and Cheap Queers, an annual performance night of LGBT entertainers at Buddies in Bad Times.

In addition to his sometimes controversial drag performances, Cole is perhaps best known for his 2010 campaign to be Mayor of Toronto.

== Theatre ==
Cole's theatrical work has included the shows Mine, Alma, The Needle Exchange and Dodged Bullets/Missed Opportunities. He also appeared in Maggie MacDonald's play The Rat King, Luis Jacob's A Dance for Those of Us Whose Hearts Have Turned to Ice and Jim LeFrancois' musical revue Arthouse Cabaret, garnering a Dora Award nomination for Best Male Performance in a Musical in 2008 for Arthouse Cabaret.

In 2013, Cole participated in Salvatore Antonio's Truth/Dare: A Satire (With Dance), an interactive audience participation show which featured staged reenactments of scenes from Madonna's 1991 film Truth or Dare, at Buddies in Bad Times during Toronto's Pride Week. The show's cast also included Adamo Ruggiero and Gavin Crawford.

In 2014, Cole performed in a solo re-telling of Oscar Wilde's visit and lecture at Toronto's Allan Gardens in 1882 called Wilde in Allan Gardens. The work is immortalised in Michael Alstad's award-winning Queerstory app.

Cole had an onstage role in the creation of Box 4901, an ensemble play about personal ads and queer love written by Brian Francis. The work premiered at the Summerworks Festival in Toronto in 2018 and was re-mounted at Buddies in Bad Times Theatre in February 2020. Cole, along with the rest of ensemble of Box 4901, was nominated for a Dora Mavor Moore Award for Outstanding Performance in the 2020 Dora Awards Independent Theatre Division.

In October 2021, Cole appeared in Sky Gilbert's musical revue, The Little Show alongside Veronica Hurnik and Shaun McComb.

In August 2025, Cole appeared in Johnnie Walker's Gaylord, a play about queer Toronto icon and artist Will Munro presented at the Summerworks Festival.

== Television ==
Cole has had cameos in Queer As Folk, Locker Room for Pride Vision, Colin and Justin's Home Heist, and CBC's Baroness von Sketch Show. In 2006, Cole was a contestant on Canada's Worst Handyman on Discovery Channel Canada. Cole went on to "win" the competition.

== Film ==
Cole has directed a number of experimental short films, including Toilet (1996), Nancy Boy vs Manly Woman (1997), Coyote, Beautiful (2002), and I Think I'm Coming Down With Something (2003). He collaborated with visual artist Michael Caines on The Boys Next Door (2001), Sunflower (2004), and Une Petite Mort (2005). In 2004, a cover story for the Liaison of Independent Filmmakers of Toronto (LIFT) magazine described his films as "full of beautiful images that also make you giggle".

In 2009, Cole was the subject of the Toronto-based queercore band Kids on TV video Still On About Keith Cole, which he also directed and choreographed.

== Visual and performance art ==
Cole is notorious for an incident in December 2004. While hosting a fundraiser at Buddies in Bad Times, the audience appeared to be losing interest in some of the performers — during one of Cole's introductions he pulled down his pants and began to urinate on the stage. Although he was publicly criticized by Fife House, the event's beneficiary, he has noted in subsequent interviews that the press attention he gained from the incident actually advanced his career.

Cole has made and exhibited work that incorporates both performance and material objects.

In 2007, he collaborated with Luis Jacob on A Dance for Those of Us Whose Hearts Have Turned to Ice, an installation based on the work of contemporary dance pioneer Francoise Sullivan and British sculptor Barbara Hepworth. Cole choreographed and performed in the video component of the work, which was first presented at Documenta in Kassell, Germany, and later at Birch Contemporary in Toronto.

In 2015, Cole turned his attention to the late Canadian painter Tom Thomson. Partly developed at a Drake Devonshire Residency in March 2015, the Thomson project culminated in #Hashtaggalleryslut, presented at the Art Gallery of Ontario in 2016. The event was curated by Wanda Nanibush and featured found objects and imagined artifacts, video and performance incorporating a tribute to the late artist David Buchan and Cole as Thomson drowning in a canoe full of water.

Cole has exhibited performance and other work at Paul Petro Contemporary Art in Toronto, including the solo show Three Bad Words in 2011.

Cole also presents regularly with FADO Performance Art Centre. His performance art practice often intersects with pedagogical conventions such as academic presentations and lecture demonstrations. FADO projects, including Vivencia Poética in 2008 and Valley of the Dolls with Keith Cole in 2018, are examples of this.

== Awards ==
- Harold Award (1999)
- Pink Triangle Award for Community Service in the LGBT Community (2000)
- National Tap Dance Award (2004)
- XTRA! Magazine Mouthiest Queer Activist Award (2010)
- NOW Magazine Best of Toronto Reader's Choice Award for Best Performance Artist (2014)

== Mayoral candidacy ==
In 2010, Cole ran as a candidate for Mayor of Toronto in the city's mayoral election. His major campaign themes involved support for arts and culture, improvements to the city's bicycling network, and efforts to increase and develop a renewed sense of civic engagement in the city, where recent municipal elections have seen voter turnout of as little as 40 per cent or less. He also campaigned on the issue of adding green space to the city's Yonge-Dundas Square (now Sankofa Square), staging a "MILF Diaper Toss" on May 9 after having a political discussion in which he was discouraged from pursuing the issue on the questionable grounds that adding trees to the square would encourage young mothers to litter the space with dirty diapers.

Cole was one of two minor candidates, along with Rocco Achampong, selected by an online vote to participate alongside the six major candidates in a debate on municipal voting reform sponsored by the civic advocacy group Better Ballots.

== Academic career ==
Cole holds a BFA from York University and an MFA from the OCAD University. Since 2014, Cole has taught visual culture in the Faculty of Liberal Studies at Seneca College. In 2019, Cole was appointed to the Faculty of Community Services and Faculty of Arts as Artist-in-Residence at Ryerson University (now Toronto Metropolitan University). Cole also teaches Sexual Diversity in the Humanities Department at George Brown College.
