= Jess Dobkin =

Canadian artist (born 1970)

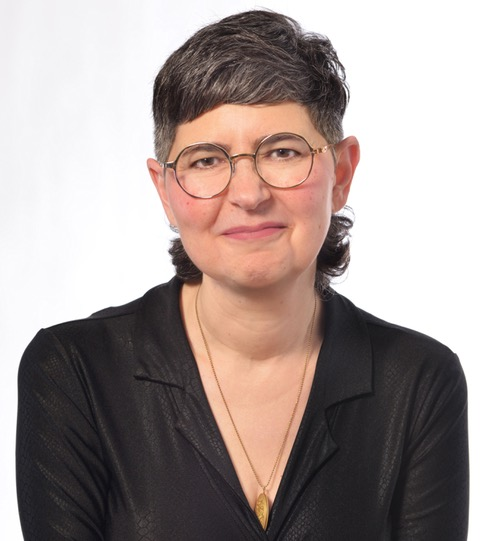
- Jess Dobkin, photographed by David Hawe, 2025
- Born: 1970 (age 55–56)
- Known for: performance artist
- Movement: Feminism, Queer, LGBTQ
- Website: jessdobkin.com

Jess Dobkin is a performance artist, curator, teacher, and activist whose work has been presented internationally in theatres, galleries, art fairs, festivals, museums, and public spaces. She has been described as an "internationally acclaimed queer performance artist" [1], and her interdisciplinary career spans more than 30 years. Her work explores the dynamic relationship between live performance, documentation, and the archive, engaging with sensory experience, embodiment, affect, and collaborative care.

== Education and early work ==
Dobkin earned her BA in Women's Studies and Art from Oberlin College and MFA in Visual Art from Mason Gross School of the Arts, Rutgers University During the 1990s in New York, Dobkin was active with WOW Café Theater, ACT-UP, and the Lesbian Avengers, work she later described as foundational to her approach to performance, community organizing, queer activism, and mutual-aid projects.

Early in this period, she received grant awards including the Franklin Furnace Fund for Performance Art and the Astraea Foundation. She performed at NYC downtown venues including WOW Café, Dixon Place, La MaMa, PS122, the Kitchen, and toured her Utopia Roaming performance project in a painted cargo van with artist collaborators to universities and queer community centres throughout the United States.

In a 2025 interview on the podcast Cruising: Queer History and Culture, she discussed her long-standing commitment to queer and feminist organizing, including the genesis of Lesbians for Liberty with Lisa DeBoer, and efforts to increase lesbian visibility and challenge homophobia in the WNBA.

== Artistic practice ==
In 2002, Dobkin moved from New York to Toronto, where she has received support from the Canada Council for the Arts, the Ontario Arts Council, and the Toronto Arts Council. Her work has been presented internationally, including in the United Kingdom, Mexico, Brazil, Belgium, Germany, Canada, and across the United States. She has undertaken residencies and collaborative projects with Hemispheric Institute for Performance and Politics at New York University, the Banff Centre (Canada), Fierce Festival in Birmingham (UK), the Theatre Centre (Canada) and others.

Across her career, her work has been noted for provoking both discomfort and awe, approacIn a conversation subjects with care and using humour to facilitate engagement. Her body often serves as material, medium, and testing ground for technologies, prosthetics, and costumes, blurring distinctions between artist and artwork. She has collaborated extensively with D/deaf and disability communities, and is recognized for her organizing and mentorship within queer, feminist, and activist circles. In a conversation about her work, the artist mentioned how her adult child's experience informs a lot of her work.

In Toronto, she organized two independent marches with Alex Tigchelaar —Take Back the Dyke (2010) and StoneWall TO (2011)—created in response to concerns about corporatization and police presence at Toronto Pride. Between 2005 and 2009, she organized a social and support group for single queer mothers, and currently co-facilitates online peer-support spaces focused on perimenopause and menopause. Dobkin continues to produce Dyke Nights in Toronto, which feature DJ sets, performances, readings, and a night market.

== Major works ==
=== For What It's Worth (2023) ===
Commissioned by the Wellcome Collection, London, UK. For What It's Worth is a museum immersive installation that explores the politics and ethics of human milk sale and exchange in the 21st century. In a review of the exhibition, The Daily Telegraph wrote that it "brings the latest exhibition at London's Wellcome Collection to a triumphant, chaotic and decidedly bling climax." It was also covered in Hyperallergic^{[}^{,} The Grocer, ARTnews, and The Polyphony.

=== Wetrospective (2021) ===
Wetrospective was Dobkin's first solo retrospective exhibition curated by Emelie Chhangur at the Art Gallery of York University (AGYU) (Toronto, Canada), occupying four gallery rooms and featuring a custom-built digital finding guide with augmented reality (AR) components, computational art elements, live performances, and public programming.

The exhibition was created with support and collaboration of Sensorium: Centre for Digital Arts and Technology at York University, Hemispheric Encounters, the AMPD Makerspace, FADO Performance Art Centre, York University faculty and students, D/deaf artist collaborators and ASL interpreters, and local DJs. The exhibition received in-depth coverage in Hyperallergic, C Magazine and Galleries West.

A book related to the exhibition, Jess Dobkin’s Wetrospective: Constellating performance archives edited by Laura Levin, was published by Intellect Books and AGYU (UK, Canada 2024). The publication has been accompanied by performance events in Toronto at Buddies in Bad Times Theatre, New York City at Hemispheric Institute for Performance and Politics, London at Live Art Development Agency, and Montreal at Festival TransAmériques.

=== The Lactation Station Breast Milk Bar ===
The Lactation Station Breast Milk Bar (Toronto 2006, Montreal 2012, Edmonton 2016) is a participatory performance in which audiences are invited to taste samples of human breast milk donated by new mothers, designed to provoke dialogue about intimacy, taste, risk, culture, and taboo. During a 2016 interview about the exhibition, Dobkin mentioned that she brought her daughter with her during its presentation in Edmonton, noting the practical realties of performing while parenting.

The performance was recognized as "Best Performance Art" by Xtra Magazine in 2006. The project has received ongoing media and scholarly attention, and sparked conversation with a wider public, with numerous articles exploring its critical engagement with cultural norms, taboos, and the history of breastfeeding, intimacy, and social risk. Documentation from the project was exhibited at the Art Gallery of Ontario (8 October 2022 – 23 April 2023) as part of Her Flesh curated by Renata Azevedo Moreira.

=== The Magic Hour (2017) ===
From 2014 to 2016, Dobkin was Artist-in-Residence at Theatre Centre (Toronto, Canada) where she created The Magic Hour, a 75-minute solo performance created with a team of theatre designers and collaborators.

The performance engages directly with questions of how traumatic experiences are narrated. In a conversation with Laura Levin, Dobkin reflected on the political and dramaturgical pressures placed on testimony, asking how personal experiences of sexual violence or identity formation become framed as linear "stories" and what is lost in that framing.

Writing on the performance, Levin argues that Dobkin "queers hierarchies of mattering" by drawing attention to the production apparatus that shape its creation, treating elements such as lighting, sound, and backstage labour as integral to its meaning.

The Magic Hour was developed in collaboration with director Stephen Lawson, lighting designers Michelle Ramsay and Jennifer Tipton, and sound designer Richard Feren. The show received a Dora Mavor Moore Award for Outstanding Lighting Design.

=== The Artist-Run Newsstand (2015–2016) ===
For one year Dobkin created and operated The Artist-Run Newsstand, a newsstand kiosk located in Chester Station, a Toronto subway station. The kiosk served as a site for performances, installations, screenings, artist talks, and the sale of zines and artist multiples, while also functioning as a magazine and sundries shop.

=== The Artists' Soup Kitchen (2012) ===
In 2012, Dobkin organized The Artist's Soup Kitchen with collaborators Stephanie Springgay and Catherine Clarke, a curatorial and community-engaged project that offered free weekly hot lunches to artists during the Toronto winter. Each week a different artist led the lunch, bringing their own creative approach to the Artist's Soup Kitchen, which, according to the organizers, served over 500 people during the project.

== Teaching and curatorial work ==
=== Teaching ===
Dobkin's artistic practice is closely connected to her research and academic involvement. She is Lead of the Performing Archives Stream of Hemispheric Encounters: Developing Transborder Research-Creation Practices, a seven-year Social Sciences and Humanities Research Council (SSHRC) grant project (2020–2027) that brings together scholars, artists, activists, and community organizations across Canada, the United States, and Latin America to explore hemispheric performance as a mode of addressing social and environmental justice.

She held fellowships at the Mark S. Bonham Centre for Sexual Diversity Studies at the University of Toronto (2012–2015) and was Artist in Residence at the Hemispheric Institute for Performance and Politics at New York University (2018–2019).

She has taught courses in Performance Art, Visual Strategies, Art History, and Professional Practice as a Sessional Lecturer at OCAD University, Sheridan College, and the University of Toronto, and presents lectures, artist's talks, and workshops, and participates in conferences and panels internationally.

=== Selected curatorial projects ===
In addition to her work as an artist and educator, Dobkin curates and produces performance art events and exhibitions. Selected curatorial projects include:

- 2025 – Transnocheo – Hemispheric Encounters with Performance Studies International, Fortaleza, Brazil
- 2017 – MONOMYTHS – FADO Performance Art Centre, Toronto, Canada
- 2012 – The Artist's Soup Kitchen – The Raging Spoon Cafe, Toronto, Canada
- 2011 – Commitment Issues – FADO Performance Art Centre, Toronto, Canada
- 2011–2012 – HATCH Season (Guest Curator) – Harbourfront Centre, Toronto, Canada
- 2009 – I Love you/(I Love You) Too – Buddies in Bad Times Theatre, Toronto, Canada

== Selected exhibitions and performances ==
A comprehensive chronology of Dobkin's exhibitions and performances appears in the monograph published alongside her 2021 retrospective.

- 2025 – "Jess Dobkin's Wetrospective" Performance and Book Launch – Festival TransAmériques, Montreal, Canada
- 2025 – "Jess Dobkin's Wetrospective" Performance and Book Launch – Live Art Development Agency, London, UK
- 2024 – "Jess Dobkin's Wetrospective" Performance and Book Launch – Hemispheric Institute for Performance and Politics, New York City, US
- 2024 – "Jess Dobkin's Wetrospective" Performance and Book Launch – Buddies in Bad Times Theatre, Toronto, Canada
- 2024 – What We Crave – 7a*11d International Festival of Performance Art, Toronto, Canada
- 2023 – For What It's Worth – Wellcome Collection, London, UK
- 2022 – You're Welcome – Birmingham Art Museum and Gallery, Birmingham, UK
- 2022 – Conjuring the Archive – FIERCE Festival, Birmingham, UK
- 2022 – Holding Coburn – OCAD University, Toronto, Canada
- 2021 – Jess Dobkin's Wetrospective – AGYU, Toronto, Canada
- 2019 – Dempsey-Millan TALIXMXN – FADO Performance Art Centre, Toronto, Canada
- 2019 – TALIXMXN – Museo Universitario Arte Contemporáneo, Mexico City, Mexico
- 2017 – The Magic Hour – The Theatre Centre, Toronto, Canada
- 2017 – Our Future, Our Fate, Our Fortune – Toronto International Art Fair, Toronto, Canada
- 2016 – Audience Fee – Abrons Arts Centre, New York, US
- 2016 – The Lactation Station Breast Milk Bar – University of Alberta Fine Arts Building Gallery, Edmonton, Canada
- 2015–2016 – The Artist-Run Newsstand – Chester Avenue Subway Newsstand Kiosk, Toronto, Canada
- 2015 – How Many Performance Artists Does It Take to Change a Light Bulb (For Martha Wilson) – Images Festival, Toronto, Canada
- 2014 – Flowers and Untitled (For José Esteban Muñoz) – NYU Hemispheric Institute Encuentro, Montreal, Canada
- 2013 – Free Childcare Provided – Rapid Pulse Festival, Chicago, US
- 2012 – The Lactation Station Breast Milk Bar – Studio 303 and OFFTA Festival, Montreal, Canada
- 2012 – Flowers – MIX NYC Festival, New York, US
- 2011 – Power Ball: Bleeding at the Ball – The Power Plant, Toronto, Canada
- 2010 – Power Ball 12: Power Balls $100 – The Power Plant, Toronto, Canada
- 2010 – Everything I've Got – Edgy Women Festival, Montreal, Canada
- 2009 – Mirror Ball – Performance Mix Festival, New York, US
- 2006 – Fee for Service – ScotiaBank Nuit Blanche, WARC Gallery, Toronto, Canada
- 2006 – The Lactation Station Breast Milk Bar – Fado/OCAD Professional Gallery, Toronto, Canada

== Awards ==
- 2018–2019 – Chalmers Arts Fellowship Award
- 2002, 1997 – Franklin Furnace Fund for Performance Art Grant Award

== Public collections and library archives ==
Dobkin's work is held in numerous institutional and special-collections archives, including:

- Franklin Furnace Archive (New York, US)
- NYU Hemispheric Institute of Performance and Politics (New York, US)
- The Lesbian Herstory Archives (New York, US)
- Middlebury College (Vermount, US)
- The Live Art Development Agency (London, UK)
- The British Library (London, UK)
- Studio 303 (Montreal, Canada)
- Artexte (Montreal, Canada)
- University of Toronto (Toronto, Canada)
- York University (Toronto, Canada)

== Selected videos ==
Jess Dobkin's works distributed by Vtape include:

- Score Times Moves (Video / 4 min / 2015)
- Flowers (Video / 6 min / 2012)
- Being Green (Video / 4 min / 2011)
- This is My Work: Compilation DVD (2003–2010)
- Clown Car (Video / 3 min / 2008)
- Restored (Video / 5 min / 2005)
- An Ontario Bride Seeks American Wives (Video / 5 min / 2004)
- The Bookworm (Video / 3 min / 2004)
- Silent Portrait Series (Video / 5 min / 2003)

== Selected publications ==
- Dobkin, J. (2014). Everything I've got (excerpt). In U. Chaudhuri & H. Hughes (Eds.), Animal acts: Performing species today (pp. 189–196). University of Michigan Press. ISBN 978-0-472-90110-4
- Dobkin, J. (2012). Fee for service. Performing Ethos: An International Journal of Ethics and Performance, 3(2), 205–208.
- Dobkin, J. (2012). Performing with mother's milk: The Lactation Station Breast Milk Bar. In M. Chatzichristodoulou & R. Zerihan (Eds.), Intimacy across visceral and digital performance. Palgrave studies in performance and technology (pp. 62–73). Palgrave Macmillan. ISBN 978-1-137-28333-7 doi:10.1057/9781137283337_6
- Dobkin, J. (2009). Emergency exits monologue #2. In S. G. Cole (Ed.), Lesbian scenes and monologues: An anthology. Playwrights Canada Press. ISBN 978-0-88754-799-7

== Selected bibliography ==
- Cvetkovich, A. (2022). Jess Dobkin. Wetrospective. Journal of Curatorial Studies, 11(1). doi:10.1386/jcs_00058_5
- Mock, R. (2016). Jess Dobkin: Performing the human condition through the puppet body. In J. Householder & T. Mars (Eds.), More caught in the act: An anthology of performance art by Canadian women. YYZ Books.
- Reeve, C. (2019). Inside/outside/beside the mothering machine: A conversation with Jess Dobkin. In C. Reeve & R. E. Buller (Eds.), Inappropriate bodiees: Art, design and maternity. Demeter Press. ISBN 978-1-77258-209-3
- Reeve, C. (2012). Jess Dobkin: Mom, dyke, frog. In R. E. Buller (Ed.), Reconciling art and motherhood. Ashgate. ISBN 978-1-138-27444-0
- Weintraub, L. (2019). Breast milk – Jess Dobkin. Eco materialism and contemporary art. Intellect Books. ISBN 978-1-78320-940-8
