= Km/h (TV series) =

Canadian television sitcom

km/h is a Canadian television sitcom, which aired on TVA, a French language television network in Quebec, from 1998 to 2006.

The series starred Michel Barrette as Denis, a father and husband who worked as an automobile journalist, and who was regularly drawn into madcap and foolish situations by his best friend Germain (Gildor Roy). The cast also included Chantal Baril, Marilyse Bourque, Francis de Passillé, Gilbert Turp, Nathalie Claude, Sonia Vachon, Isabelle Brouillette and Robert Brouillette.

The series ended production in 2006, although episodes continue to reair on TVA's Prise 2. Roy subsequently wrote a screenplay for a potential feature film adaptation, although no film was produced or released.
