= Kim Katrin Milan =

Canadian writer and artist (born 1984)

Kim Katrin
- Born: March 9, 1984 (age 42) Port of Spain, Trinidad and Tobago
- Occupation: Author; artist; educator; consultant
- Citizenship: Canadian

Website
- kimkatrin.com

Kim Katrin (born March 9, 1984) is a Canadian American writer, multidisciplinary artist, activist, consultant, and educator. She was formerly credited as Kim Crosby and Kim Katrin Milan. She speaks on panels and keynotes conferences nationally, and facilitates radical community dialogues. Her art, activism and writing has been recognized nationally.

== Education ==
Katrin completed her artist residency under d'bi Young at the AnitAfrika Theatre and was a student of the Buddies in Bad Times Young Creator's Unit. She is a certified yoga trainer and teacher.

== Writing, art, and work ==
Katrin's writing and voice have been featured on NPR, CBC Radio, Out (magazine), the Toronto Star, The National Post, The Huffington Post, Autostraddle Feminist Wire, Elixher, and Daily Xtra. She has created over 70 workshop series on social change, anti-oppression, intersectionality, race, gender, leadership, youth and young women's empowerment.

As a multidisciplinary artist, she regularly curates exhibitions, cabarets events, performs and works on productions across Canada. She produced and co-curated the Buddies in Bad Times Cabaret Insatiable Sisters with Gein Wong.

She also engages in community based healing initiatives including teaching Queer and Brown Girls Yoga, and hosting yearly healing retreats for femme identified Folks of Colour and Indigenous Folks. Brave New Girls, retreats and healing skill shares. Other community work includes consulting, curricula development, community empowerment, facilitation and workshops.

== Projects and campaigns ==
- Performance curator: Insatiable Sisters cabaret, co-curated with Gein Wong at Buddies in Bad Times Theatre – 2014–2016.

== Awards and recognition ==
- Featured as one of the 100 Black Lesbian, Bisexual, Queer and Transgender Women You Should Know.
- Recognized by The Root (magazine) as a Young Black Feminists to Watch, 2014.
- Featured on The Feminist Wire as "Feminists We Love," 2013.
- Featured as one of Go Magazine's '100 Women We Love' in 2012.
- Huffington Post 50 Gay Canadians We Love: Kim Crosby.
- Autostraddle's Hot 105 Alternative Girls Who Like Girls List.
- Finalist For LGBT Person Of The Year, Inspire Awards, 2012.

== Professional affiliations and community service ==
Katrin sat on the boards of Artreach, Shadeism and the Toronto Arts Council Community Arts Council.
