= Hope Thompson =

Canadian playwright and screenwriter

- Occupations: Playwright and screenwriter
- Partner: Simone Jones
- Website: www.hopethompson.net

Hope Thompson is a Canadian playwright and screenwriter.

== Education ==
Thompson graduated from Norman Jewison's Canadian Film Centre.

== Career ==
Thompson's first play, Green, premiered in 2004 at Buddies in Bad Times' Rhubarb! Festival. Including Green, four of Thompson's works would premiere at Rhubarb! Festivals. Her play, Trapped! premiered at the 2014 Rhubarb! Festival under the direction of Morgan Norwich.

== Works ==
=== Plays ===
- Green (2004)
- Hospital Green
- Tyrolia (2008)
- She Walks the Line
- Stiff
- Trapped! (2014)
- The Love Crimes of Frances Lark (2015)
- Dead Money

== Filmography ==
=== Film ===
Year	Work	Role	Notes	Ref.
1995	Crossing the Line	writer	short film	
1997	It Happened in the Stacks	writer	short film	
1999	Switch	writer, director	short film	
2010	Trailing Arbutus	writer	short film	

=== Television ===
Year	Work	Role	Ref.
2018-19	Baroness von Sketch Show	story editor	

=== Books ===
- Dark Thoughts & Other Stories (DarkWinter Press, 2026)

== Personal life ==
Thompson studied at Mount Allison University (BFA) and at the University of British Columbia (MFA).
