= Clara Gutsche =

American-born Canadian photographer, educator and art critic

Clara Gutsche (born April 20, 1949) is a Canadian photographer, educator and art critic living and working in Montreal, Quebec.

She was born in St. Louis, Missouri. She studied visual arts at Concordia University and obtained a MA in photography. She teaches photography part-time in the Studio Arts department at Concordia.

She was a founding member of the artist-run Powerhouse Gallery (now La Centrale galerie Powerhouse) in Montreal.

In 2024, Gutsche won the Scotiabank Photography Award.

== Work ==
Gutsche's work portrays the relation between people and their environments. Her series La série des couvents ("The Convent Series") shows nuns in various convents in Quebec.

Her photographs have been exhibited at the McCord Museum, the Musée d'art de Joliette, the Canadian Centre for Architecture, Montréal, the Canadian Centre of Photography in Toronto and the Americas Society building in New York City.

Her work is held in public collections, including the Canadian Museum of Contemporary Photography, the Canadian Centre for Architecture, the Musée national des beaux-arts du Québec and Library and Archives Canada.

Clara has worked frequently with her spouse, fellow photographer David Miller; they collaborated on her Milton Park series.

=== Photography series ===
- Milton Park, 1970 - 1973
- Six Sisters / Les six soeurs, 1974 - 1976
- Inner Landscapes / Les paysages vitrés, 1976 - 1980
- Parkscapes / Les paysages domestiques, 1982 - 1984
- Sarah, 1982 - 1989
- The Lachine Canal / Le canal de Lachine, 1985 - 1990
- Convents / Couvents, 1990 - 1998
- High School Series / Les collèges, 1993 - 1998
- The Bedroom Series / La série des chambres, 1999 - 2001
- Windows / Les vitrines, 2000 - 2002
- Inhabited Landscapes / Les paysages habités, 2004 - 2005
- Sonoran Desert Landscapes, 2003 - 2007
- Windows II / Les vitrines II, 2000 – 2008, 2020 – 2021
- Siblings, 2008 - 2022
