= Lesbian Gay Bi Trans Youth Line =

Canadian LGBT youth organization

The Lesbian Gay Bi Trans Youth Line (LGBT YouthLine, "YouthLine"), founded in 1994, is a peer support organization for LGBT youth across the province of Ontario. Although originally known for their phone support line, the organization also offers online chat, SMS and e-mail support services, as well as promoting and supporting other events and programs for 2SLGBTQ+ youth.

In 2011 the YouthLine, in conjunction with Toronto City Councillor Kristyn Wong-Tam, created an award, named in memory of Toronto artist Will Munro, to honour LGBT youth involved in community arts projects in Ontario.

== Toronto Catholic District School Board ==
In January 2021, YouthLine denounced the Toronto Catholic District School Board's decision to suddenly remove the service from their online mental health resource list for students. The removal was called "homophobic, transphobic, and racist."

According to the Ontario Superior Court of Justice, Joseph Volpe, a former Liberal MP, published articles under his Italian-Canadian newspaper company, Corriere, with a number of homophobic comments and he called for the removal of the YouthLine's services. In May 2022, YouthLine and the other defendants won and all of Volpe's charges against them were dropped.

See: TCDSB, Controversies, Elimination of LGBTQ+ Online Support
