= Aurora Stewart de Peña =

Canadian playwright and director

Aurora Stewart de Peña (born October 4, 1979) is a Canadian playwright and director. Born in Stratford, Ontario and based in Toronto, she is the author of 36 Little Plays About Hopeless Girls, which premiered at the Tranzac Club in Toronto in August 2006, going on to gain critical praise at the 2009 Toronto Fringe Festival. She is also the author of Family Story, Lily-Rose, Dumbo Squid and a collection of short plays performed annually at the Brooklyn College, and the coauthor with Nika Mistruzzi of The Physical Ramifications of Attempted Global Domination.

She is a founder of the performance collective Birdtown and Swanville with Nika Mistruzzi. The collective is currently in residence at Toronto theatre Buddies in Bad Times.

Her debut novel, Julius Julius, was published in 2025. It was shortlisted for the 2025 Atwood Gibson Writers' Trust Fiction Prize.
