= Sue Golding =

American philosopher (born 1964)

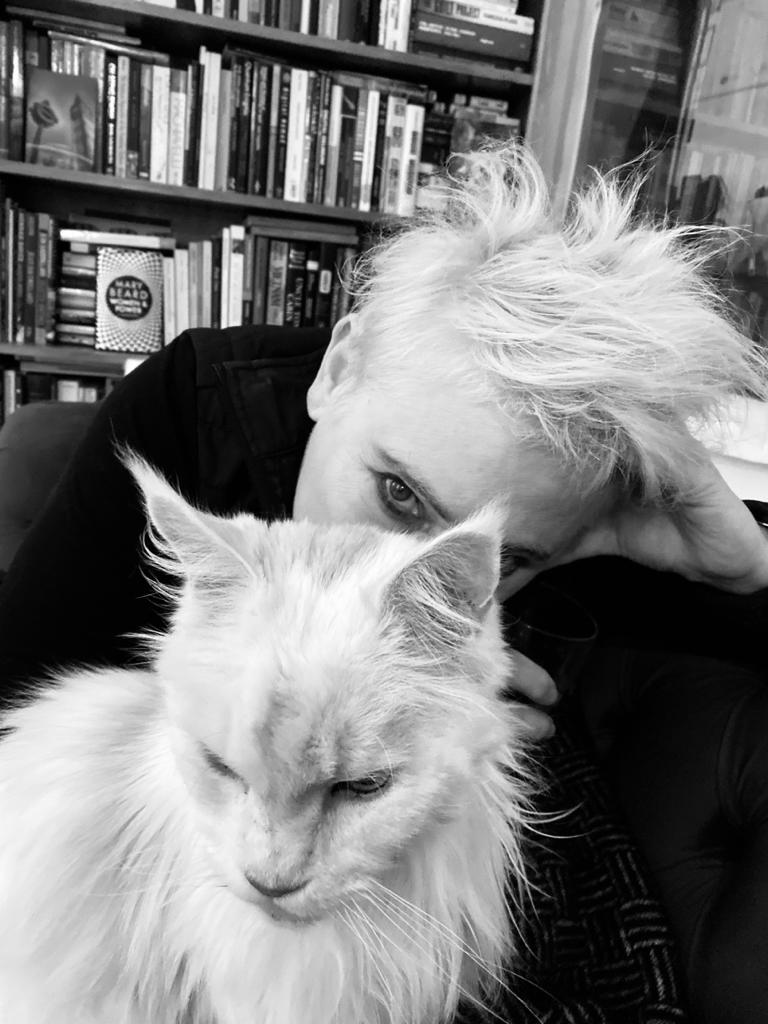
- Golding and the Mighty Finn 2020
- Born: Johnny Golding; New York City, U.S.

Johnny Golding (also known as Sue Golding) is an American philosopher who is Professor of Philosophy & Fine Art, and senior tutor at the Royal College of Art, London, England. Golding's work deals with the onto-epistemological nuances of radical matter: artificial and distributed intelligence, embodiment, and the ethical-political. Golding is Philosopher-in-Residence at the Royal Academy, London (2019). Golding also leads the PhD Research Lab Entanglement, which includes 25 PhD researchers and is co-led with artist Meg Rahaim. Most recently the lab-produced "Entanglement: Just Gaming," a mixed-media approach to consciousness, poetics, warfare, and risk set across several social platforms (including Vimeo, SoundCloud, YouTube, TikTok, Instagram). From 2012-16, Johnny was Director of the Centre for Fine Art Research (CFAR) at Birmingham School of Art (Birmingham City University), and from 2009-2012 Director of the Institute for the Converging Arts and Sciences (ICAS) at the University of Greenwich and Head of Theory at the Jan van Eyck Akademie in Maastricht (1998–2003)..

== Personal life and work ==
Born in New York, Golding lived in Toronto where she completed her PhD in political philosophy at the University of Toronto, concurrently studying under the tutelage of Michel Foucault, Ernesto Laclau, and from 1980-84 under the guidance of Raymond Williams at Cambridge University. She was the founding President of Buddies in Bad Times Theatre, the first LGBT theatre company in Canada, from 1983 to 1995. She was a regular contributor to The Body Politic, a monthly magazine that played a key role in the LGBT community in Canada.

In 1994 Golding moved to Soho, London. She has written and edited several books including Gramsci's Democratic Theory, The Eight Technologies of Otherness, and On the Verge of Photography. She produces public lectures presented in the form of sound/image installations, often in complete darkness. She was the head of theory at the experimental post-academic institute, the Jan van Eyck (Maastricht), from 1998-2003, where she worked with artist Steve McQueen, art historian Norman Bryson, and philosopher-artist Sarat Marharaj.
