= FreeUp! The Emancipation Day Special =

Annual Canadian television special

FreeUp! The Emancipation Day Special is an annual Canadian television special, which was broadcast for the first time by CBC Gem on August 1, 2020. Growing out of an arts festival created by actress Ngozi Paul in 2017, the special features musical, acting, dancing, comedy and spoken word performances by Black Canadian and Indigenous Canadian performing artists to celebrate Emancipation Day.

== Performers ==
=== 2020 ===
- Jully Black
- Jay Rukas
- Sarah Musa
- Chivengi
- David Delisca
- Andrew Forde
- Zoë Edwards
- Amina AbNa Alfred
- Mackenta
- Amaka Umeh
- Janette King
- Aba Amuquandoh
- Hassanlogic
- Matthew "Snoopy" Cuff
- Jendayi Dyer
- Travis Knights
- Jaz Fairy J
- Esie Mensah

=== 2021 ===
- Aquakultre
- Bukola
- Peace Akintade
- Tawiah M'carthy
- Silla + Rise
- Luke Reece
- Shah Frank
- Randell Adjei
- Wayne Tennant
- Michie Mee
- Haviah Mighty
- Hollywood Jade
- Anyika Mark
- Aria Evans
- RVZON
- d’bi.young anitafrika

=== 2022 ===
In 2022, the special was paired with Freedom Talks, a special roundtable discussion on freedom and racism in Canada. It also followed a different format than the previous two years, blending creative performances, documentary segments on Caribana, St. Lawrence Hall and the Buxton National Historic Site and Museum, and a tribute to jazz musician Joe Sealy.

- Jully Black
- Measha Brueggergosman
- Hollywood Jade
- Zaki Ibrahim
- Matter of Black
- Ahmed Moneka
- Red Sky Performance
- Shad
- TiKA

== Awards ==
The 2020 special received a Canadian Screen Award nomination for Best Performing Arts Program at the 9th Canadian Screen Awards in 2021.

At the 11th Canadian Screen Awards in 2023, the 2022 performance special was nominated for Best Variety or Entertainment Special, Freedom Talks was nominated for Best Performing Arts Program, and Paul was nominated for Best Writing, Variety or Sketch Comedy.
