= Karen Bernard =

American choreographer and performance artist

Karen Bernard is an American choreographer and performance artist. Bernard is the Founder and executive director of New Dance Alliance in New York City. Karen Bernard creates nuanced, movement-based work that explores divergent themes surrounding the female body—from motherhood to sex goddess to murder victim. Using sampled dance styles and episodic scenes, Bernard pits everyday life and current events against perceptions of the feminine mystique and aging. The work is developed in the context of location and an intuitive fusion of costuming, sporadic sound scores, video, and minimal sets. Unpredictable choices from the mundane to the extravagant translate into a form that compels my audiences to look at their own experiences from alternative perspectives which, in turn, can alter their actions and reactions.

== Early life ==
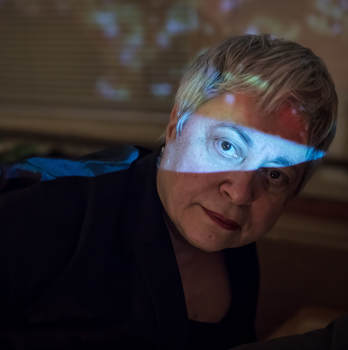
Karen Bernard, photo by Svelta Atanasova

Karen Bernard was born in Brookline, MA, and grew up in Marblehead, MA. She began studying dance at age three under the tutelage of her father, Steven Bernard, a company member with modern dance pioneer Charles Weidman. Her childhood home consisted of a barn, which Bernard's father renovated to include a large dance studio and office, attached to the family home. The constant flow of students filtering in and out sparked Bernard's study of performance merging with life itself.

In 1966, Bernard received a three-year scholarship to attend The Boston Museum of Fine Art, but after one year, diverted to join the pilot program of The London School of Contemporary Dance. By 1969, Bernard premiered a solo in collaboration with sculptor David Tremlett at Tate Britain (f.k.a Tate Gallery) and performed an adaptation of Les Sylphide while on tour with Captain Beefheart & His Magical Band at The Royal Albert Hall on March 27, 1972.

== Career ==
Bernard moved to New York City in 1979, where her adult life began to mirror her formative years. Her husband, the painter Scott Wixon, began to renovate a loft in Tribeca to include painting and dance studios, an office, in their living space, where they raised three children. Between 1986 and 1998, Bernard presented a series of solos presented in collaboration with Dia Center for the Arts in SoHo, most notably Footsteps on the Dance Floor (1996). During this time, she began to steadily integrate projection, popular music, photographs, and found objects as performance elements, juxtaposing these with her unique movement quality.

The early years saw the premieres of Blue, Star, Dying for Lace, Vinyl (1999) at Danspace at St. Mark's Church, Removed Exposure (2004) at Dixon Place, and Surfing The Shadow(2007) at Joyce SoHo (originally, Dia Center for the Arts), among other works. A handmade book for Removed Exposure, was co-created with Canadian bookmaker Gray Fraser. Bernard continued to explore themes of grief, honesty, age, and humor throughout these works, often to critical acclaim.

From 2008 to 2022, through a series of residencies and performances, Bernard created most notably Ouette (Bogliasco), Showgirls (Emily Harvey Foundation and Brooklyn Studios for Dance), Vinyl Retro (The Kitchen) Poolside (Obras and Chashama), Lakeside (Obras, Chashama, and L'Annexe), Green (Cill Rialaig Project), and Device Not Detected (Emily Harvey Foundation).

Bernard has been an Artist in Residence at Movement Research (1997-1998) and Brooklyn Studios for Dance (2018) and served on the board of directors at Earthdance from 2011 to 2013, where she co-founded The E|MERGE Interdisciplinary Collaborative Residency, which continues to this day.

Bernard is credited as being the inaugural artist at Montreal's Edgy Women Festival produced by Studio 303 in 1994. Edgy Women and Edgy Redux are feminist experimental art events devised by Miriam Ginestier and produced by Studio 303 that ran for 23 years from 1994 to 2016. Karen Bernard was a key choreographer with the Edgy Women Festivals in 1994, 1997, 1998, 1999, 2000, 2001, 2002, 2003, and 2005.

== New Dance Alliance ==
In 1986, Karen Bernard founded New Dance Alliance, Inc., a non-profit organization offering artistic residencies (Black Artists Space to Create, LiftOff and Satellite) and Performance Mix Festival. For over thirty years, NDA has operated out of its Tribeca loft to provide opportunities to the artistic community starved of resources. As an artist and the Founder and executive director of New Dance Alliance (NDA), she teaches, lectures, and serves on advisory panels across the U.S., Canada, and Europe.

In 2006, Bernard was awarded the BAX 10 Award, for her service to artists in the founding and development of the Performance Mix Festival.

== Selected works ==
- Device Not Detected (2022)
- Lakeside (2020)
- Poolside (2019)
- Showgirls (2018)
- Green, Performance (2017), Film (2018)
- Ouette (2012)
- Surfing The Shadow (2007)
- Removed Exposure (2004)
- CAUTION: The Madonna Songs (2001)
- Blue, Star, Dying for Lace, Vinyl (1999)
- It Could Have Been Different (1997)
- Footsteps on the Dancefloor (1996)
- Buono Duo (1988)
