= Nathalie Claude =

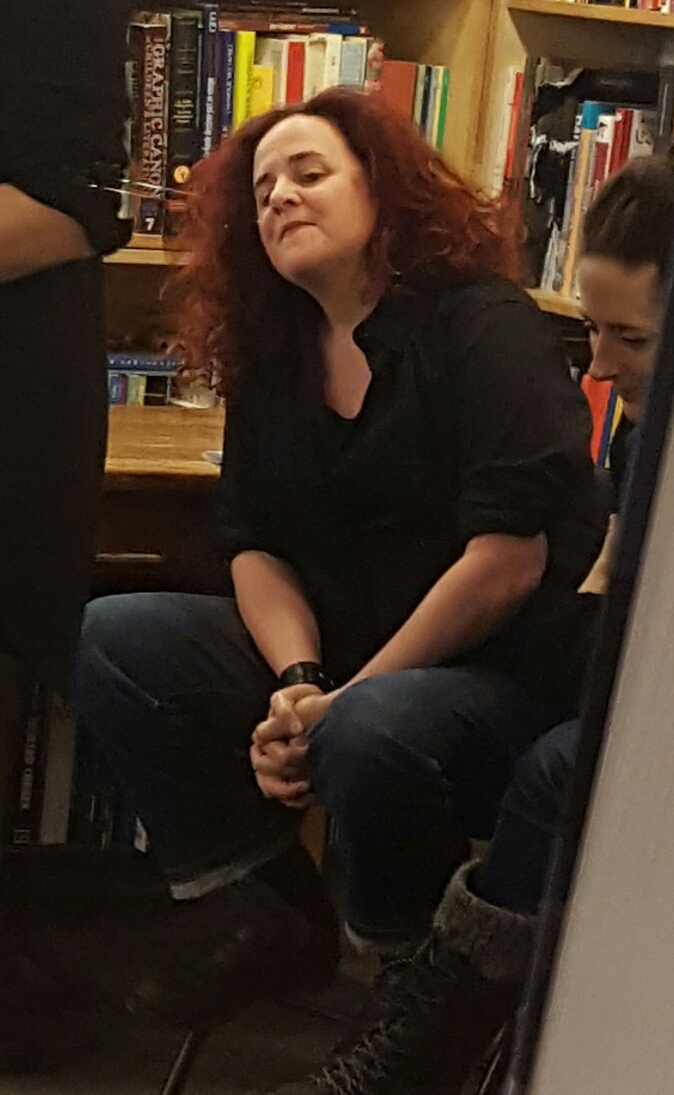
Nathalie Claude photographed in Montreal, Quebec, Canada at the bookstore Le Port de tête

Nathalie Claude is a self-described "actress, director, dancer, choreographer, writer, and a sometimes MC, Drag King, clown, artistic coach and musician" from Montreal. She works in French and in English and sometimes creates bilingual performances.

She created her first five solos for Studio 303 in Montreal and toured many of them to Toronto (Buddies in Bad Times Theatre), New York (Performance Mix Festival and Dixon Place), Berlin (Ausland), Florence (Teatro della Limonaia) and Ljubljana (City of Women)." One of her most notable works was Le Salon Automate/The Salon Automaton, in which she shared the stage with three human-sized robots. Created in 2008 at Montreal's Usine C, it then toured Quebec, and was featured in Buddies In Bad Times' 2009 theatre season, all to great critical acclaim. As a member of the theater collective Momentum, she collaborated with such artists as Céline Bonnier and Lin Snelling to generate theatre pieces, including: Les Filles de Séléné (1999-2001), La Fête des Morts (2002-2004), and Limbes/Limbo (2004).

She has been a contributor to two Montreal-based annual queer feminist platforms: Le Boudoir, a lesbian cabaret night which existed from 1994–2006, and Edgy Women, a platform for feminist experimental performance which incarnated annually from 1993 - 2016. In addition to this, Claude was a frequent feature of Toronto's Hysteria: A Festival of Women directed by Moynan King at Buddies in Bad Times Theatre.

She has also appeared on screen in Canadian produced films such as Higglety Pigglety Pop! or There Must Be More to Life, The Orphan Muses (Les Muses orphelines) and Mistral Spatial. On TV, she played for 6 years the character of "Tite-Lène" in the Quebec sitcom Km/h.

Nathalie was a co-designer of an exhibition at the Montreal Museum of Fine Arts: JW Waterhouse: The Garden of Enchantment. It was "the largest-ever retrospective of works by the celebrated pre-Raphaelite British artist John William Waterhouse." The exhibition was named in Canadian Art Magazine as one of the top ten exhibitions in Canada in 2009.

Most recently, she toured internationally from 2012 - 2015 with the Montreal-based circus company Cirque Du Soleil, playing Jeeves, the male clown in the show Amaluna.
