= Coral Short =

Canadian multimedia artist and curator

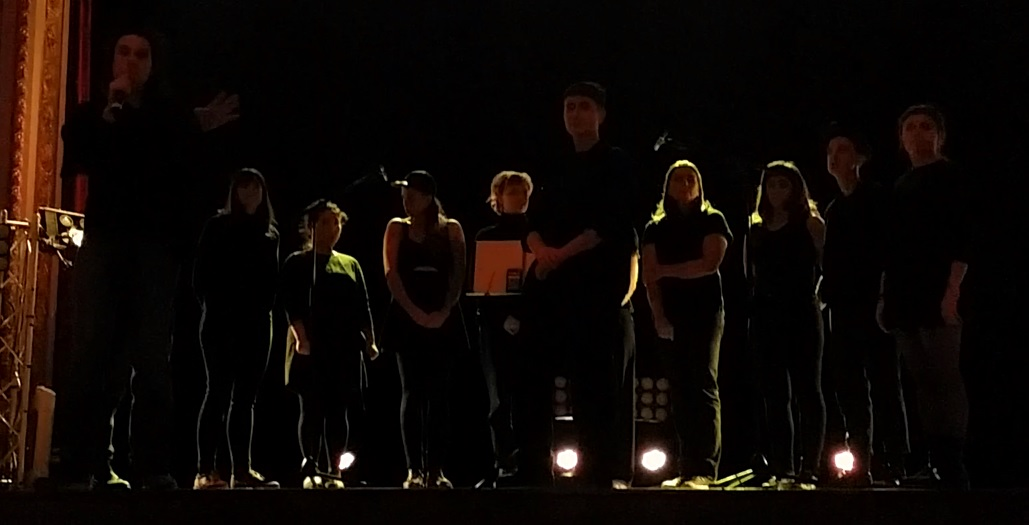
- Coral Short photographed in Montréal, Québec, Canada in the Rialto Theatre.
- Born: 1973 (age 52–53); Victoria, British Columbia

Coral Short (born 1973) is a queer Canadian multimedia artist and curator. Based in Berlin and Montreal, they are best known for their performance art, as a curator of short film programs, and as a creator of affordable queer artist residencies.

== Career ==
Short was educated at Concordia University and obtained their master's degree in fine art at the Chelsea School of Art. They use textiles, video, nature, and their own body as their media. Short has curated independent queer films internationally in Canada, the United States, the United Kingdom, Germany, and elsewhere in Europe. In this capacity, they have worked with organizations such as MIX NYC, MIX Copenhagen, Entzaubert Festival (Berlin), and the Queer Arts Festival.

=== Multimedia and performance art ===
While still attending Concordia University in 1998, Short formed Women With Kitchen Appliances, a performance art collaborative.

In 2012, Short's project The Hole-y Army, featuring choreographed queers and 100 hand-made puppets, was integrated into Dyke Marches in New York City, Montreal, Ottawa, and Toronto. Short identifies as a third-wave feminist and is notable within the craftivism movement. They describe this work as "a slow, thoughtful activism [and] a strong powerful display of resistance." Stop Beating Yourself Up, first performed in 2013 at Edgy Women in Montréal, involves Short wearing boxing gloves and hitting themself for three hours. They repeated the same performance, Stop Beating Yourself Up (this time for one hour) at Vancouver's Queer Arts Festival opening art party in 2015.

Scream Choir is a 2014 sound piece consisting of a large group of people screaming in the formation of a traditional choir. The Laughter Choir is a similar 2015 sound piece with a choir of laughter and was performed at Art in the Open in collaboration with Sarah Wendt (and Russell Louder assisting) along with Scream Choir. Fake Orgasm Choir is a 2016 work featuring a large group of people standing in the formation of a traditional choir. Instead of singing notes, they fake orgasms. In 2017, Short used their previous experiences in working with the voice as an instrument and presented a human noise workshop on sound experimentation and production from the body at Sound Acts co-curated by FYTA in Athens, Greece.

Future Visions is a 2014 work presented as a website of over 100 video tarot cards representing queer voices from Europe and North America. Other performance pieces include Gay Incantations (2013), Nest (2014), and Plush (2015).

In 2016, Short began curating regular film screenings in Berlin, including a sporty queer video program called "Pumped" for Gegen, Berlin's biggest queer party. In 2017, they received a grant from Senatsverwaltung für Kultur und Europa to pay 115 of the video artists they curated that year.

In 2018, they began a series of short eco performance works on their Instagram. They also facilitated three plant-based ASMR workshops with Jean P'ark at Martin-Gropius-Bau as part of Welt ohne Außen: Workshops, curated by Isabel Margarita Lewis. These workshops were an opportunity to hear and create beautiful noises as well as relax.

=== Selected films ===
- We Don't Want to Marry (2013)
- Gay Incantations (2013)
- Genderless Jellyfish (2013)
- Narcissus (2011)
- HUMANimals (2011)
- Lesbian Hand Gestures (2011)

Short was awarded the HARDtv Hot Shorts Award at the 2012 Inside Out Film and Video Festival for Narcissus, a short about trans love. In 2014, Short withdrew We Don't Want to Marry from the Vancouver Queer Film Festival program because the festival accepted advertising from a pro-Israel group Yad b'Yad.
