= Buddies in Bad Times =

Canadian queer theatrical company

Coordinates: 43.66402°N 79.38289°W

Buddies in Bad Times Theatre
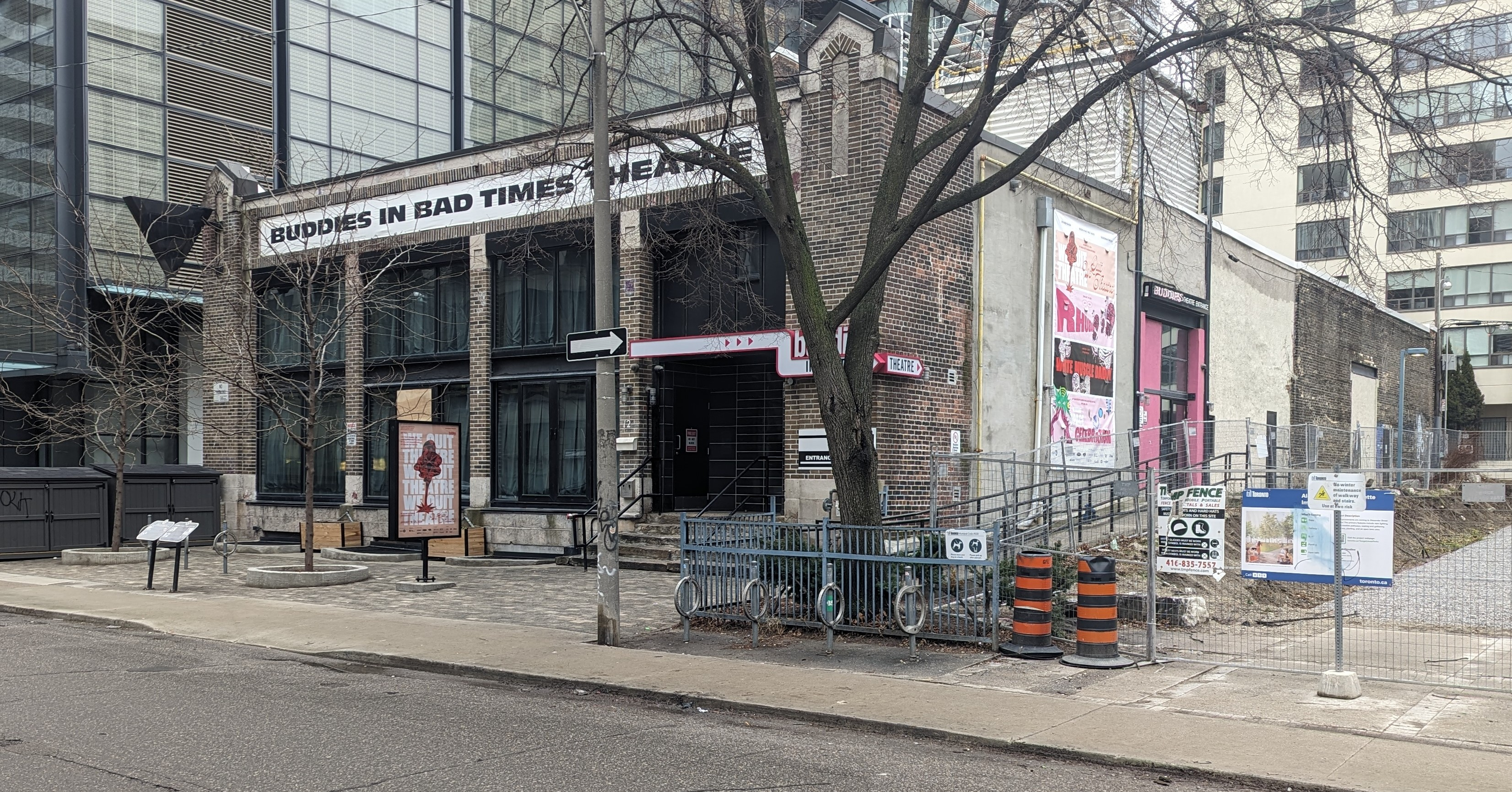
- Buddies in Bad Times in 2024
- Interactive map of Buddies in Bad Times Theatre
- Address: 12 Alexander Street; Toronto, Ontario, Canada; M4Y 1B4

Construction
- Opened: 1979

Website
- buddiesinbadtimes.com

Buddies in Bad Times Theatre (BIBT) is a Canadian professional theatre company. Based in Toronto, Ontario, and founded in 1978 by Matt Walsh, Jerry Ciccoritti, and Sky Gilbert, Buddies in Bad Times is dedicated to "the promotion of queer theatrical expression". It's the largest and longest-running queer theatre company in the world.

Although the company eventually achieved notoriety and success in the 1980s as a queer theatre company, it wasn't founded with that intent. Buddies' original focus was on staged adaptations of poetry. However, during the 1980s, under the sole leadership of Sky Gilbert, Buddies developed a distinctly queer aesthetic and practice. The company is known for work that is political, pro-sexual, and anti-establishment. In 1983, Sue Golding joined the company as its founding Board President, a post which she held until 1995. Some of the company's earliest commercial and critical successes included productions of Gilbert's Lana Turner has Collapsed! (1980), The Dressing Gown (1984), Drag Queens on Trial (1985), and The Postman Rings Once (1987); Don Druik's Where is Kabuki? (1989); as well as the Sex Tours of the Church-Wellesley community hosted by Gilbert's drag persona Jane.

== History ==
Buddies in Bad Times was established and incorporated in Toronto in 1979. Sky Gilbert was the company's first artistic director. Sue Golding was Board President from 1983 to 1995.

Buddies' inaugural production was a Sky Gilbert play, Angels in Underwear. An anthology of Beat poetry, Angels starred Matt Walsh as Jack Kerouac and Jerry Ciccoritti as Allen Ginsberg, and was performed at The Dream Factory on Queen Street in Toronto in September 1978.

Gilbert, Walsh, and Ciccoritti, along with playwright Fabian Boutilier, subsequently founded the Rhubarb Festival of Canadian Plays, first produced by the theatre company at The Dream Factory in January 1979 and featuring short plays written by local, unknown playwrights directed by all four of Rhubarb's founders.

The name Buddies in Bad Times was taken from the poem of the same title by the French poet Jacques Prévert. It was used between Walsh and Gilbert about their friendship during their years at York University and The Three Schools of Art.

Shortly after Walsh and Ciccoritti stopped working with the company in its infancy, Gilbert moved its artistic direction toward the then-emerging gay subculture of Toronto. Buddies has become one of North America's premiere queer theatres and has aided the successful careers of dozens of Canadian actors, playwrights, and directors.

=== 1979–1983 ===
Buddies was one of the six influential companies who banded together to form The Theatre Centre in Toronto—a movement of theatre that was hailed as the "next wave". Buddies formed an alliance with Nightwood Theatre to create six collaborative Rhubarb! Festivals. The Rhubarb! Festival was held for the first time in 1979.

By 1983 Buddies in Bad Times Theatre was receiving funding from four levels of government.

=== 1985–1993 ===
In 1985 BIBT gave birth to the 4-Play Festival which premiered at Theatre Passe Muraille. This festival was dedicated exclusively to the promotion of lesbian and gay writers and creators. Seed Shows came into being in 1986. The Seed show DNA Theatre's This Is What Happens in Orangeville won a jury prize at The Festival Des Ameriques in Montreal. Platform 9 Theatre's Steel Kiss was also produced, having been born out of Rhubarb! and developed through Seed. It is now known as one of the most important plays of the 1980s.

BIBT's first mainstage production, Sky Gilbert's The Postman Rings Once, opened with Toronto Workshop Productions at 12 Alexander Street in 1987. Tim Jones became general manager in 1988. By 1990 BIBT had been nominated for and presented with numerous cultural awards. In 1990, Gilbert's Drag Queens in Outer Space was produced in Seattle and San Francisco.

In 1991, BIBT set up its first permanent performance space at 142 George Street. Sky Gilbert's Suzie Goo: Private Secretary went on to win a Dora Mavor Moore Award for Best Production. Daniel MacIvor's 2-2-Tango was nominated for a Floyd S. Chalmers Canadian Play Award and Don Druick's Where Is Kabuki? was nominated for a Governor General's Award. BIBT also supported smaller independent companies, such as Platform 9 by Robin Fulford; Topological Theatre by Edward Roy; and the Augusta Company by Daniel Brooks, Don McKellar and Tracy Wright.

By 1993, BIBT had successfully negotiated a 40-year lease with the city and entered into a partnership with The Alexander Street Theatre Project, a company formed primarily to raise funds and manage expenses for the renovation of the theatre. Sue Golding was President throughout this period.

=== 1994–1998 ===
In 1994 BIBT opened its first season at Alexander Street with Sky Gilbert's More Divine. The community support for the company was at an all-time high, and Strange Sisters had achieved notoriety.

Queerculture, 4-Play, and Seed Shows all ended during this period. Associate artists took on a larger role of shaping the subsidized work in the building, and as a result there was great success with Daniel MacIvor's Here Lies Henry and The Soldier Dreams. Sky Gilbert's Ten Ruminations on An Elegy Attributed to William Shakespeare toured to glowing reviews in Great Britain with stops in London, Brighton, and Cardiff. Two anthologies of Sky Gilbert's plays were also published.

In 1996, Tim Jones resigned as general manager. 1997 marked the highly successful Martha Steward Projects and The Attic, the Pearls and Three Fine Girls and the resignation of founding artistic director Sky Gilbert. Sarah Stanley was appointed as Sky Gilbert's successor in April, and Gwen Bartleman was appointed general manager in July.

During the 1997–1998 season, BIBT's profile rose with the premiere of Brad Fraser's Martin Yesterday and Diane Flacks' Random Acts, as well as the 20th anniversary of Rhubarb! curated by festival director Franco Boni. RHUBARB-O-RAMA!, an anthology of works from the Rhubarb! Festival over the years, was published in 1998

1997–1998 heralded a renewed commitment to play development, marked by the birth of the Ante Chamber Series and the development of six scripts under the supervision of company dramaturg Edward Roy. In 1997, the theatre also hosted the inaugural We're Funny That Way! festival of LGBT comedians.

BIBT's programming grew more ambitious in 1998–1999; the company produced the world premiere of R. M. Vaughan's camera, woman, the Toronto premiere of Live With It by Winnipeg playwright Elise Moore, and the repertory run of Robin Fulford's Steel Kiss and Gulag.

=== 1999–2000 ===
In 1999, following a national search, David Oiye was hired as BIBT's third artistic director.

Expanding its commitment to gay, lesbian, and bisexual youth, BIBT launched its first annual Summer Youth Arts Programme in 1999, providing a summer-long outlet for twelve queer youth, and two year-round internship positions.

BIBT's 1999 tribute to Canadian singer-songwriter Carole Pope, Shaking the Foundations, received Dora Mavor Moore Award nominations for Outstanding Production, Direction, and Musical Direction, and won in the category of Outstanding Female Performance (for Paula Wolfson).

BIBT also increased its commitment to new play development in 1999 by introducing Winter Fling in partnership with the Shaw Festival, to develop and present workshops of new Canadian scripts.

=== 2000–2003 ===
Over the 2000–2001 season, BIBT programmed Vancouver-based artist Dorothy Dittrich's award-winning musical When We Were Singing, Winnipeg playwright Ken Brand's comedy Burying Michael, and PileDriver! from Edmonton-based companies Guys in Disguise and Three Dead Trolls in a Baggie.

For the 2001–2002 season Buddies produced the largest production in its history with Kelly Thornton's Peep Show (designed by Steve Lucas and Sherri Hay, with lighting by Michael Kruse), and also received eight Dora Mavor Moore Award nominations for da da kamera's production of In on It by Daniel MacIvor as well as Damien Atkins' Real Live Girl, the latter of which won in the categories of Outstanding Male Performance and Outstanding New Musical.

During the 2002–2003 season Gwen Bartleman resigned as general manager. Jim LeFrancois stepped in to oversee operations as Buddies' producer in the spring of 2003. Shows presented that season included James Harkness' rural drama Homage and Stem (created by Greg MacArthur, Ruth Madoc-Jones, Erika Hennebury, and Clinton Walker), developed through Buddies' developmental programmes.

The 2002–2003 season also launched the late night series Tallulah's Cabaret, dubbed the Friday Superstar Series, featuring performers such as Sasha Van Bon Bon, Kitty Neptune, R. Kelly Clipperton, Pretty Porky and Pissed Off, Will Munro, Kids on TV, and Josh Schwebel. A highlight of the 25th Rhubarb! Festival included two works from a contingent of Czech artists.

=== 2003–2006 ===
In 2003–2004 Buddies celebrated its 25-year anniversary by programming its largest season ever and welcoming back key artists who helped shape the company over the years. Sky Gilbert returned to direct the season opener, his Play Murder (which starred Jason Cadieux, Marc Gushuliak, Ellen-Ray Hennessy, Ann Holloway, Jane Johanson, and Edward Roy), and artistic director David Oiye directed a re-mount of one of Gilbert's biggest hits, Suzie Goo: Private Secretary.

Moynan King returned as associate artist, and was instrumental in launching Hysteria: A Festival of Women. Moynan also joined forces with Franco Boni on The Retro Rhubarb! Festival, which featured new work and pieces from past incarnations of the festival. Hits of The Retro Rhubarb! Festival included Hope Thompson's Green and The Magic Key and Peter Lynch's Colourful Conversation. Damien Atkins' Real Live Girl returned, as did a remount of Brad Fraser's Unidentified Human Remains and the True Nature of Love from Crow's Theatre.

For 2004–2005, offered a season of theatrical works by Greg MacArthur (Snowman), Daniel MacIvor (da da kamera's Cul-de-sac), Mirha-Soleil Ross (Yapping out Loud), Marie Clements (Native Earth's The Unnatural and Accidental Women), Adam Bock (Theatrefront's Swimming in the Shallows), Darren O'Donnell (Mammalian Diving Reflex's Suicide-site Guide to the City), Ann Holloway (Kingstonia), Sky Gilbert (Cabaret Company's Rope Enough), and Judith Thompson (Volcano's adaptation of Henrik Ibsen's Hedda Gabler).

Moynan also had great success with the second incarnation of Hysteria: A Festival of Women, which saw artists come to Buddies from as far as Sweden (The Lion Kings). Damien Atkin's Real Live Girl toured to London (The Grand Theatre) and Winnipeg (Manitoba Theatre Centre), and in June Cheap Queers returned to Buddies.

The company's 2005–2006 season included shows such as R. M. Vaughan's The Monster Trilogy, Marie Brassard's Jimmy, The Scandelles' remount run of Under the Mink, Salvatore Antonio's family drama In Gabriel's Kitchen, and Daniel MacIvor's A Beautiful View.

The company also workshopped a new play by artist d'bi young, and supported presentations of Edward Roy's The Golden Thug (Topological Theatre) and Sky Gilbert's Bad Acting Teachers and the workshop of Diane Flacks' new one-woman show Bear With Me (Nightwood Theatre). The company's Queer Youth Arts Programme brought youth into Buddies throughout the season, to learn about theatre, see shows and meet artists and to create their own performance for Pride Week.

=== 2006–2007 ===
The company's 2006–2007 season, dubbed ArtSexy2, was experimental in structure, development, and presentation. Instead of full-scale productions, the company instead presented a series of works-in-development, which allowed the audience an opportunity to see artists developing non-linear work in workshop settings. Most of the presentations were only two or three performances long and the season was divided into three "waves" of development, each around a core theme: Wave One, The Creator/Performer; Wave Two, Audience Relocation (anchored around the presentation of Mammalian Diving Reflex's Diplomatic Immunities); and Wave Three, Art & Sex (which included a presentation by performance artist Annie Sprinkle and Sky Gilbert's play Will The Real JT Leroy Please Stand Up).

The season also included Keith Cole's sprinkler tap-dance from Mine in Wave One; Emergency Exit's moody forest of headphones as part of their installation the evening news; and the Scandelles' Neon Nightz, an exploration of the relationship between strip clubs and the Church in Montreal in the 1990s. Also developing work in ArtSexy2 were Edwige Jean-Pierre, Andrew Kushnir, Nathalie Claude, Small Wooden Shoe, Edward Roy, Kids on TV, Mikiki, 2boys.tv, and One Reed Theatre.

This schedule was anchored by Necessary Angel's Dora Award-winning production of Insomnia and the farewell season of the da da kamera theatre company, which staged three solo shows directed by Daniel Brooks and performed by Daniel MacIvor. Here Lies Henry, Monster, and House had some of the most successful runs in Buddies' history.

=== 2007–2008 ===
The 2007–2008 season, Guilty Pleasures, offered an array of performance styles.

ArtHouse Cabaret, a modern queer vaudeville conceived and directed by Jim LeFrancois and David Oiye, opened the 2007–2008 season. The set design for this multidisciplinary production transformed the theatre, and featured Keith Cole as the omniscient MC, burlesque from The Scandelles, Shane MacKinnon, and 2boys.tv. ArtHouse Cabaret won Outstanding New Musical at the 2008 Dora Mavor Moore Awards.

The 2007–2008 line-up also included a large-scale burlesque from The Scandelles (Who's Your DaDa?), a new musical from Sky Gilbert (Happy), a modern dance programme (Art Fag), and the return of Hardworkin' Homosexuals' Cheap Queers.

=== 2008–2009 ===
Two young artists developed through Buddies' Queer Youth Arts Programme took centre-stage in 2008–2009. Agokwe, written and performed by Waawaate Fobister, enjoyed critical acclaim and won six Dora Awards. Agokwe received awards for Outstanding Production of a Play, Outstanding New Play, Outstanding Performance by a Male in a Principal Role (Waawaate Fobister), Outstanding Direction of a Play (Edward Roy), Outstanding Costume Design (Erika Iserhoff), and Outstanding Lighting Design (Kimberley Purtell). Mark Shyzer, also from the Queer Youth Arts Programme, wrote and performed Fishbowl: A Concise, Expansive Theory Of Everything. This limited run performed to sold-out audiences.

Buddies continued long-time partnerships with Canadian cultural artists and independent theatre companies. Crow's Theatre, Mammalian Diving Reflex, The Scandelles, Necessary Angel, Native Earth Performing Arts, 2boys.tv, Small Wooden Shoe, and Sky Gilbert were also included as part of the 2008–2009 season.

During this period, Buddies in Bad Times Theatre felt increased pressure related to the 2008 financial crisis. Gay4Pay, written by Edward Roy, had its scheduled mid-season run cancelled. Buddies' extended family of artists came forward to help weather the financial storm. Daniel MacIvor performed his one-man show Cul-de-Sac, raising much-needed revenue. Sharron Matthews and a cast of musical theatre performers presented Sing Out, Louise! and The Scandelles performed Funhouse. Comedians Gavin Crawford and Elvira Kurt also mounted a joint comedy show, Together Again for the First Time.

During the 2008–2009 season, major changes to staffing occurred. Jim LeFrancois resigned as artistic producer and David Oiye announced that 2008–09 would be his last season as artistic director.

=== 2009–present ===
Following an extensive national search for a new artistic head, the company underwent two major shifts in leadership in 2009. Director Brendan Healy became the artistic director in October 2009, and acting general manager Shawn Daudlin officially became the general manager of the company in December 2009.

The programming for the 2009–2010 season, the final season programmed by Oiye, featured work led by female creators. This decision was in response to a national study on gender parity in Canadian theatre which revealed that female representation in theatres is very low. Participating artists included The Scandelles (Neon Nightz), Nina Arsenault (The Silicone Diaries), The Independent Aunties (Breakfast), and Nathalie Claude (The Salon Automaton).

Healy's first season in 2010–2011 featured many artists long associated with the company, such as Sonja Mills, Evalyn Parry, Sky Gilbert, and 2boys.tv, while also announcing some new directions for the company. For the first production of the season, Healy helmed the English-Canadian premiere of Sarah Kane's play Blasted. Rhubarb! returned with a new festival director, Laura Nanni, and featured, for the first time, off-site performances in public spaces. Buddies also embarked on two major national tours of productions from its recent repertoire, Agokwe and The Silicone Diaries. The company received five Dora Mavor Moore Awards (for Outstanding Production, Lighting Design, Set Design, Sound Design, and Direction) for its production of Blasted. This year also saw a 25 per cent growth in attendance for the company's main stage shows and festivals, which included sold-out runs of Blasted, The Silicone Diaries, and Spin.

The 2011–2012 season opened with a production of Jean Genet's play The Maids and included work from Native Earth Performing Arts, Modern Times Stage Company, and Split Britches. The season also hosted a revival of Larry Kramer's play The Normal Heart (Studio 180 Theatre), and the Toronto premiere of Margaret Atwood's The Penelopiad (Nightwood Theatre), which went on to win several Dora Mavor Moore Awards.

Buddies in Bad Times' 2012–2013 season began with Tawiah M'carthy's Obaaberima, which was originally developed as a part of the Young Creators Unit (YCU) in 2009. In the spring Daniel MacIvor returned to Buddies with his play Arigato, Tokyo. The season also included Sky Gilbert's A Few Brittle Leaves, a partnership with performance company Ecce Homo to present Of a Monstrous Child: a Gaga Musical, and Studio 180's The Normal Heart. Laura Nanni returned as the Rhubarb Festival director and oversaw the return of the very successful One-To-One performance series and Mobile Works project. The 34th Rhubarb Festival broke all previous attendance records and engaged almost 200 artists. The season saw 22 Dora Mavor Moore Award nominations overall, including three awards for Obaaberima (Music, Set Design, and Outstanding Production). In 2012, Buddies was voted Toronto's Best Small Theatre Company by Now Magazine.

The 2012–2013 season also saw the completion of two large-scale initiatives: a three-year Audience Development Project, and a strategic planning process that helped revise Buddies' mandate and articulated a long-term vision for the company.

Buddies' 2013–2014 season marked the company's 35th anniversary. Its programming included the world premiere of PIG directed by artistic director Brendan Healy, the return of the Strange Sisters Festival, and the premiere of The Gay Heritage Project. The 35th Rhubarb Festival, helmed by director Laura Nanni, marked the milestone with a 35 Performances for 35 Years Cabaret. The festival looked to explore ideas of heritage and archiving while looking forward to possible queer futures. The 2013–2014 season was filled out with multiple guest companies, including Theatre Rusticle, Pleiades Theatre, Cahoots Theatre Company, Cabaret Company, and inDANCE.

The 2014–2015 season included Lois Fine's Freda and Jem's Best of the Week, Evalyn Parry's SPIN, and Michel-Marc Bouchard's Tom at the Farm. Mel Hague took over as festival director for the 36th Rhubarb Festival.

In 2015, Evalyn Parry became the new artistic director for the theatre. The 2015–2016 season opened with The 20th of November, directed by outgoing artistic director Brendan Healy, as well as a remount of The Gay Heritage Project; Gertrude and Alice by Evalyn Parry, Anna Chatterton, and Karin Randoja; Body Politic by Nick Green; and work by Sky Gilbert and Sunny Drake.

The 2016–2017 season opened with a queer version of Rebecca Northan's long-running clown improv show Blind Date. The season also included Norah Sadavah and Amy Nostbakken's Mouthpiece; Tawiah M'carthy, Stephen Jackman-Torkoff, and Thomas Antony Olajide's Black Boys; Diane Flacks' Unholy; and The Youth-Elders Project in collaboration with The 519 and Senior Pride Network.

The 2017–2018 season included remounts of Unholy, Black Boys, and Mouthpiece, as well as the premiere of Kiinalik: These Sharp Tools by Evalyn Parry and Laakkuluk Williamson Bathory, My Funny Valentine by Dave Deveau, Acha Bacha by Zaiba Baig, and LULU v.7 // aspects of a femme fatale by the red light district.

2018–2019 was the theatre's 40th anniversary season. It opened with a remount of Gertrude and Alice and also included Obaaberima by Tawiah M'carthy, Shove It Down My Throat by Johnnie McNamara Walker, and Lilies; Or, The Revival of a Romantic Drama by Michel-Marc Bouchard.

The 2019–2020 season included Box 4901 by Brian Francis and the 41st Rhubarb Festival curated by new festival director Clayton Lee. Several productions during this season were cancelled due to the COVID-19 pandemic.

In 2020, during the COVID-19 pandemic, Buddies in Bad Times and CBC Arts collaborated on the production of Queer Pride Inside, a television special featuring LGBTQ performers for CBC Gem, as part of the online component of Pride Toronto.

The theatre returned to producing live events in 2022 with the 43rd Rhubarb Festival, featuring White Girls in Moccasins by Yolanda Bonnell and Distant Early Warning by Justin Miller.

The 2022–2023 season opened with The First Stone by Donna-Michelle St. Bernard and also featured Zom-Fam by Kama La Mackerel and Body So Fluorescent by Amanda Cordner and David Di Giovanni.

The 2023–2024 season opened with speaking of sneaking by daniel jelani ellis and also included a new production of Angels in America, three plays by We Quit Theatre, White Muscle Daddy by Raf Antonio, and the Toronto Fringe's Next Stage Festival.

ted witzel was announced as the theatre's new artistic director in fall 2023. The 2024–2025 season, the first season fully programmed under witzel's leadership, included Oraculum, a show mixing drag, puppetry, and projection work by drag queens Pythia and Denim.

== Artistic directors ==
- Sky Gilbert (1979–1997)
- Sarah Garton Stanley (1997–1999)
- David Oiye (1999–2009)
- Brendan Healy (2009–2015)
- Evalyn Parry (2015–2020)
- ted witzel (2023–present)
