= House of Electronic Arts =

Contemporary art museum in Münchenstein, Switzerland

- Haus der Elektronischen Künste
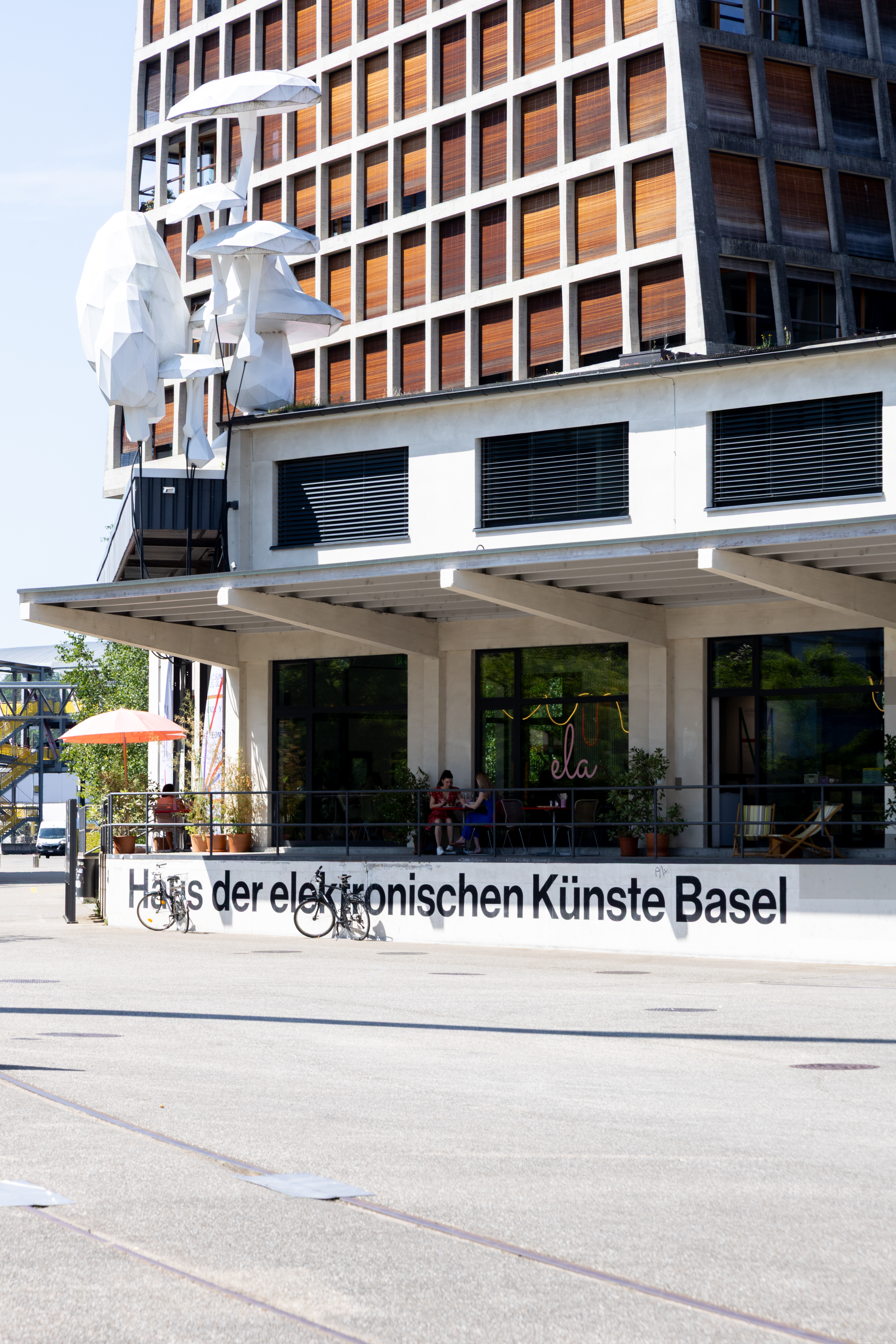
- HEK in 2025

General information
- Location: Freilager-Platz 9, 4142, Münchenstein, Switzerland
- Coordinates: 47.53290527440213°N 7.6098295970404655°E
- Opened: 2011

The House of Electronic Arts (HEK), or Haus der Elektronischen Künste, is a contemporary art museum in Münchenstein, Switzerland. Directed by Sabine Himmelsbach, HEK's exhibitions concentrate on digital, media forms and topics pertinent to the modern age of information.

Since 2018, HEK has collaborated with the Art Foundation Pax to present the Pax Art Awards each year to media artists in Switzerland. It also serves as the venue and exhibition space for works awarded the VH Award hosted by Hyundai Motor Company.

In 2016, HEK was included in the Swiss Heritage Society's second volume of Most Beautiful Museums in Switzerland.

== History ==
HEK was founded in 2011 on the Dreispitz site in Münchenstein, which was formerly a warehouse grounds then redeveloped by the Christopher Merian Foundation. Himmelsbach has directed it since 2012.

In 2014, HEK moved to Freilager-Platz, subsequently reopening on November 21 after over a year of construction. The new building offered 550 square meters for exhibitions, as well as a new foyer and café, and an event hall with 200 square meters. It also provided a robust server room in order to support the network and power needs of the museum.

In 2018, HEK faced the threat of closure after the Federal Office of Culture in Switzerland slashed its annual funding. However, losses were compensated by the Basel-Stadt and Basel-Landschaft cantons, thus allowing HEK to continue operations.

In 2022, HEK began using NFT and blockchain technologies to manage and provide memberships, as well as to collect art in digital spaces. The Friends of HEK membership platform was thus augmented to allow for collective access and decision-making in the museum's activities.

== Open Decks ==
In 2024, HEK began the Open Decks project to allow DJs to perform sets on Thursday evenings. In 2025, it changed its hours to allow attendance of exhibitions on Thursday evenings as well.

== Mesh Festival ==
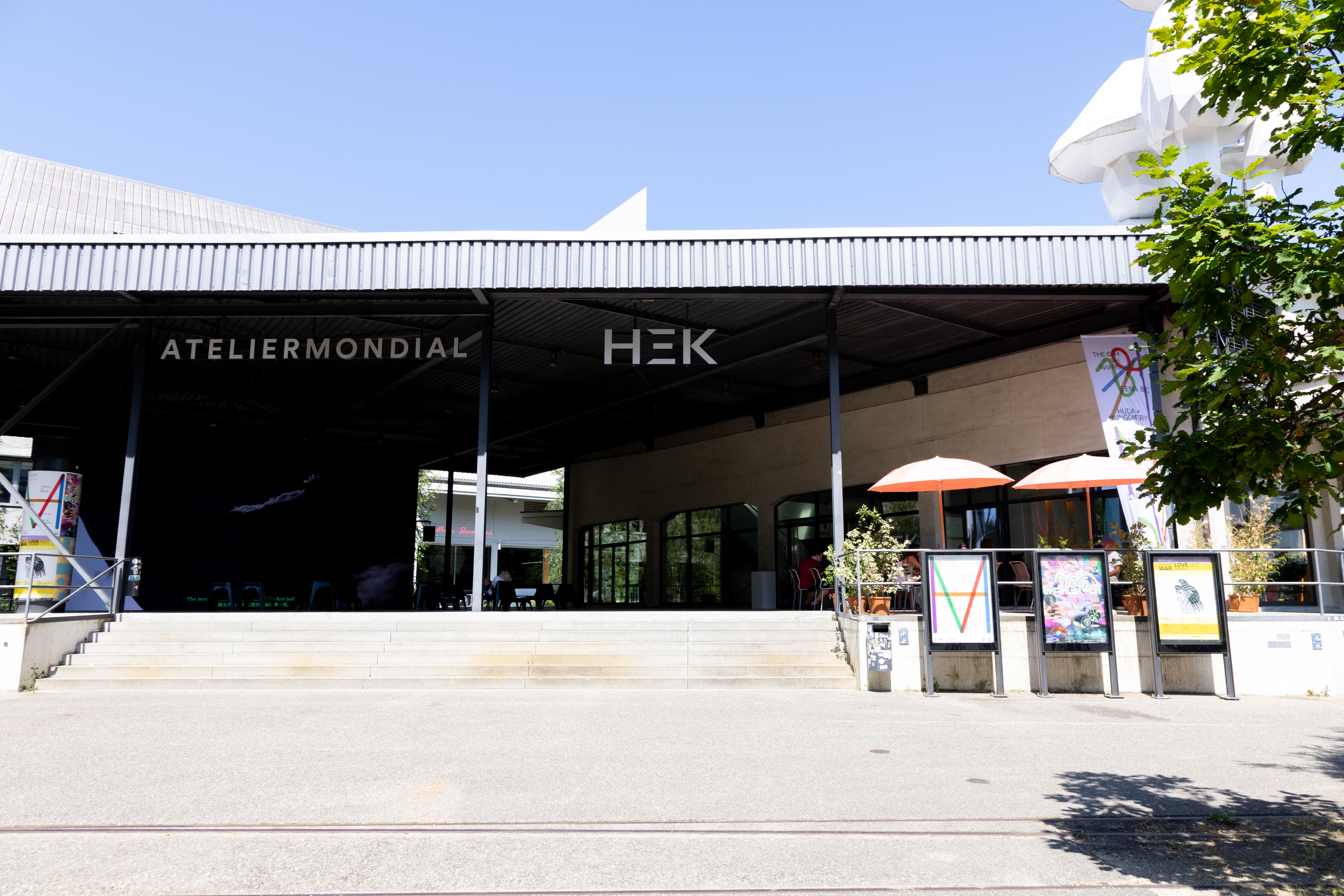
Front of HEK in 2025.

In 2024, HEK collaborated with the Basel School of Art Design to launch the Mesh Festival, a festival concentrated on innovations at the intersection of art and technology.

== Exhibitions ==
Temporary exhibitions:

- How I Learned to Stop Listening and Love the Noise, May 27–August 30, 2015
- Rafael Lozano-Hemmer: Preabsence, June 9–August 2018, 2016
- Eco-Visionaries, September 14–November 11, 2018
- Farsight Freeport, September 5–November 10, 2019
- Making Fashion Sense, January 16–March 8, 2020
- Radical Gaming, September 14–November 14, 2021
- Earthbound, October 5–November 13, 2022
- Quantum Soup, April 12–May 26, 2024
- Visual Beauty, July 18–August 18, 2024
- Tools for Change, October 7–November 17, 2024
- Other Intelligences, May 10–August 10, 2025

In addition to temporary exhibitions, the award winners of the Pax Art Awards are shown in an exhibition subsequent to the award ceremony. HEK has also shown exhibitions during certain iterations of the Liste Art Fair Basel.

== Pax Awards ==
Every year, since 2018, HEK and Art Foundation Pax have given out a series of Pax Art Awards, with a main prize, a few honorable mentions, as well as "talent development prizes" for art school graduates in Switzerland rolled out as of 2024. It is considered one of the most significant opportunities in the country for Swiss artists to find funding to support their work.
