= Alexis O'Hara =

Canadian transdisciplinary performer

Alexis O'Hara is a Canadian transdisciplinary performer, born in Ottawa, Ontario, and currently living and working in Montreal, Quebec.

Since 1997, she has been active in the Montreal cabaret and experimental music scenes. O'Hara ran the Montreal poetry slam for several years before switching her focus to vocal and electronic music and interactive performance projects. Subject to Change and The Sorrow Sponge, two projects in which audience participation and electronic clothing are elements, have toured Canada, the United Kingdom, Ireland, Belgium & Switzerland.

In 2009, she began working on immersive, interactive sound installations. SQUEEEQUE! The Speakerdome, a fort built entirely from recycled speaker boxes, has been presented at numerous media art festivals in Europe and Canada. The work was the first acquisition to Basel's Haus der Elektronische Kunst's media art collection.

She has been described as a "a mainstay of the cabaret scene in Montreal for years," performing in her drag king persona, Guizo LaNuit. She began performing as Guizo in 2003.

O'Hara is a frequent collaborator of Montreal based haute-drag / video installation artist duo 2boys.tv (Stephen Lawson and Aaron Pollard) having played a key role in Tightrope (2011–2016).

O'Hara is the niece of Catherine O'Hara and Mary Margaret O'Hara.

== Discography ==
- In Abulia (2002) - Grenadine Records
- Ellipsis (2010) - &records
- Le Grand Silence (2015) self-released
