= D'bi.young anitafrika =

Canadian musician-poet

d'bi young anitafrika
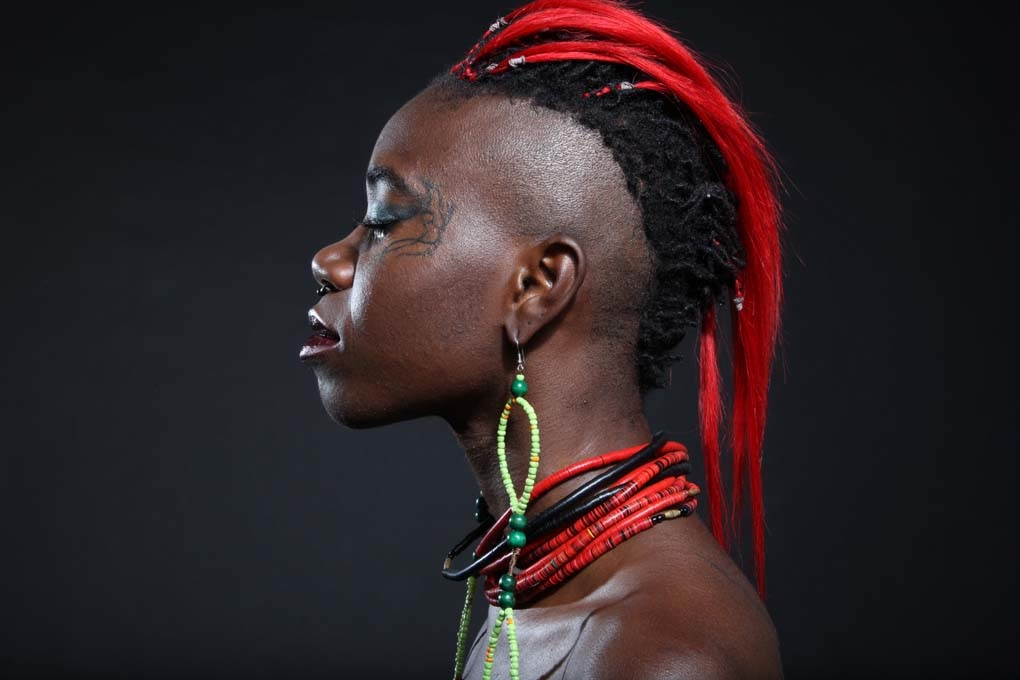
- d'bi Young
- Born: December 23, 1977 (age 48); Kingston, Jamaica
- Occupations: Dub poet, performance artist, actor, playwright
- Notable work: The Sankofa Trilogy; The Orisha Trilogy; The Ibeji Trilogy; Da Kink in My Hair

d’bi.young anitafrika is a Jamaican-Canadian feminist dub poet, activist, and singer for the band D’bi and the 333. Their (Note: Young is genderqueer and uses shx/hxr and they/them pronouns. This article uses they/them for consistency.) work includes theatrical performances, four published collections of poetry, twelve plays, and seven albums.

== Early life and education ==
d’bi young anitafrika was born on December 23, 1977, in Kingston, Jamaica to dub poet, Anita Stewart, and community organizer, Winston Young. Young spent much of their childhood in Jamaica watching their mother perform dub poetry. In 1993, they moved to Toronto, Canada, to join their parents where they completed high school.

== Career ==
Young's early career included the role of “Crystal” on the Frances-Anne Solomon produced sitcom Lord Have Mercy! (2003), theatre work with Black Theatre Workshop and Theatre Passe Muraille, and artist residencies with Soulpepper Theatre, CanadianStage, Obsidian Theatre, and Banff Centre for the Arts. In 2001, their breakout role as “Stacyanne” came through Da Kink in My Hair, by Jamaican-Canadian writer Trey Anthony, for which they were nominated for a Dora Award. Badilisha Poetry X-Change has ranked d'bi young anitafrika in the top ten poets.

Young's early poetry, including their first dub poem entitled "once dere was a mxn" written in 1988, followed the foundational aesthetic of dub poetry's form, style, and content. In 2013, Young was one of the headline names for the 2013 Human Rights Concert in Harare, Zimbabwe. There, they collaborated with Zimbabwean musician Victor Kunonga on a song called Ruvengo (Hate) off Kunonga's album Kwedu.

=== Key works ===
Young's works, The Sankofa Trilogy, The Orisha Trilogy and The Ibeji Trilogy, explore the psychological and ideological impacts of colonization to capitalism on people of African descent, from a Black Feminist perspective. They are triptych dramas.

The Sankofa Trilogy are the stories of three Jamaican women, Mudgu Sankofa, their daughter Sekesu, and their granddaughter Benu. Each play uses the women's familial bond to tell of their respective journeys of revolutionary self-determination, and transformative self-expression. The Orisha Trilogy is a series about the experiences of women characters of the past, present, and future who survived the transatlantic slave trade. In each time period, the women grapple with power, gender, and sexuality through oppression and social unrest, under the help and protection of the Orishas. The Ibeji Trilogy are three biomyth dramas about Black love as it evolves in the midst of major life changes, from friendship to romance, between mother and son, and deep self-love.

=== Publishing and theatre ===
Young established the micro-press Spolrusie Publishing, a publishing house to support the work of emerging black writers, and BQTIPOC and feminist works.

From 2008 to 2018, they also created and ran The Watah Theatre, the only black-focused performance art school in Canada. The Watah Theatre offered tuition-free professional development programs. Between The Watah Theatre and Yemoya Artist Residency, they mentored some of Canada's up and coming young black creatives and international artists of color including Amanda Parris, Kim Katrin Milan, Titilope Sonuga, and photographer, Che Kothari.

Young's style of theatre practice developed draws from their upbringing in the performative and political environment of emerging Dub poetry in Jamaica of 1980s. They use Jamaican language and idiom as nation language, as opposed to colloquialism. They work extensively with monodrama and biomythography, or “biomyth monodrama.”

They appeared on the 2021 FreeUp! The Emancipation Day Special.

== The Anitafrika Method ==
Young's work recognizes the connections between identity and community as both inextricable and sacred. The Anitafrika Method initiates self-recovery through a creative process of performance that grounds broader notions of identity, community, social constructs, and metaphysical concepts, and focuses them into an embodied performance experience. The Anitafrika Method stems from the Dub theory of their mother, Anita Stewart. They have applied the method in a variety of disciplines and with practitioners in health care, social justice, art, and leadership development.

From January to June 2015, Young applied the method in a special collaboration with the Women's College Hospital in Toronto, Ontario, Canada: The Black Womxn's Health Research Project.

In 2018, Young began work in postgraduate studies in the Praxes, Politics and Pedagogies of Black Performance at Goldsmiths, University of London.

== Personal life ==
Young is non-binary and genderqueer.

== Selected works ==
=== Plays ===
Year(s)	Title	Notes
2001	The Sankofa Trilogy	Featuring: Benu, Bloodclaat, & Word! Sound! Powah!
2006	organ-eye-zed crime	Hysteria: A Festival of Women, Buddies in Bad Times Theatre
2017	The Orisha Trilogy	Featuring: Esu Crossing the Middle Passage, Mami Wata & the Pussywitch Hunt, & Lukumi: A Dub Opera,

=== Theatre (actor) ===
Year	Title	Role	Theater	Notes
2001	Da Kink in My Hair	Staceyanne/Claudette	Toronto Fringe Festival	Role debut
2003/2005	Da Kink in My Hair	Staceyanne/Claudette	Theatre Passé Muraille	
2006	Da Kink in My Hair	Staceyanne/Claudette	San Diego Repertory Theatre California	
2006	Da Kink in My Hair	Staceyanne/Claudette	Princess Of Wales Theatre Toronto	
2007	Da Kink in My Hair	Staceyanne/Claudette	Hackney Empire London	

=== Film and Television (actor) ===
Year	Title	Role	Notes
2003	Lord Have Mercy!	Crystal	
2024	Village Keeper	Dr. Anitafrika	
