= 2boys.tv =

Canadian art duo

2boys.tv (Stephen Lawson and Aaron Pollard) are a Canadian art duo based in Montreal, Quebec, active since 2001. Lawson graduated from the National Theatre School of Canada, and Pollard from the Emily Carr Institute of Art & Design and Concordia University. Lawson and Pollard are also known both as Gigi L'Amour and Pipi Douleur. The team and real-life couple work in video-supplemented performance, video, and installation and have presented in arts and queer spaces across the Western Hemisphere, Europe, and New Zealand. The duo is known for its extravagant and intense stage spectacles.

Performance studies scholar Peter Dickinson notes that their performance work "supplements a camp aesthetic derived from drag with sophisticated video projections, original and found sound scores, the art of lip-synch and object-oriented and site-based installation (...)". 2boys.tv is interested in the plasticity of video, often using it in a sculptural way instead of as a large screen.

The name 2boys.tv resulted from looking for a web domain name for the project. "(...) We came across this .tv which both references transvestism and transversalism," the duo told The New York Times in a 2011 interview. "But it's actually the domain of the small island in the South Pacific called Tuvalu. The country sold off its domain name to raise money because it's sinking due to global warming. And, of course, we're two boys."

== Selected performance and presentations ==
- CatoptROMANTICS (2019)
- Tightrope (2011–2016)
- (re)Generation (2012)
- Phobophilia (2008, 2009, 2011)
- Zona Pellucida (2009)

== Installation ==
- ARCADE series (2009, 2011)
- Persephone (2007)

== Selected film and video ==
- Teddy Bears' Picnic (2001)
- 15 Questions (Something Blue) (2002)

== Publications ==
Lawson, Stephen. "Emcee Etiquettes: Experts Weigh In on How to Host the Perfect Cabaret Night." Canadian Theatre Review, vol. 177, 2019, p. 67-72.

Pollard, Aaron and Stephen Lawson. "Bonus Insert." Canadian Theatre Review, vol. 150, 2012, p. 1-17.

Pollard, Aaron and Stephen Lawson. "Tightrope, Translation and Transformation." Performance Research, vol. 21:5, 2016, p. 131-133.

== Prizes and awards ==
They are recipients of the 2009 Victor Martyn Lynch-Staunton Award for outstanding achievement by mid-career artists working in the Interdisciplinary Arts, Canada Council for the Arts.
