= R. M. Vaughan =

Canadian poet (1965–2020)

- Born: Richard Murray Vaughan; March 2, 1965; Saint John, New Brunswick, Canada
- Died: October 23, 2020 (aged 55); Fredericton, New Brunswick, Canada
- Education: University of New Brunswick (BA, MA)
- Occupations: Writer, poet, novelist, playwright, critic, video artist
- Writing career
- Notable works: A Quilted Heart; Invisible to Predators; Troubled: A Memoir in Poems; Bright Eyed: Insomnia and Its Cultures

Richard Murray Vaughan (March 2, 1965 – October 23, 2020), known professionally as R. M. Vaughan, was a Canadian writer, poet, novelist, playwright, journalist, critic, and video artist. He was associated with Toronto’s queer literary and theatrical communities and published work across poetry, fiction, drama, and non-fiction.

== Early life and education ==
Vaughan was born in Saint John, New Brunswick, in 1965. He attended Kennebecasis Valley High School before studying English at the University of New Brunswick in Saint John, where he earned a Bachelor of Arts degree in 1987. He later completed a Master of Arts in English at the University of New Brunswick in Fredericton in 1991.

== Career ==
Vaughan moved to Toronto in 1991, where he became active in the city’s literary and arts communities. His first play, Gentleman Caller, was produced in 1992 at Buddies in Bad Times Theatre. He served as playwright-in-residence at Buddies in Bad Times from 1994 to 1995.

He published poetry and fiction beginning in the mid-1990s, including A Selection of Dazzling Scarves (1996), the novel A Quilted Heart (1998), and the poetry collection Invisible to Predators (1999).

His later publications included Troubled: A Memoir in Poems and Fragments (2008), Compared to Hitler: Selected Essays (2013), and Bright Eyed: Insomnia and Its Cultures (2015).

In addition to literary work, Vaughan wrote arts criticism and cultural commentary for publications including The Globe and Mail, the National Post, Xtra!, and Eye Weekly, and served as arts editor for This Magazine. He also produced short films distributed through the Canadian Filmmakers Distribution Centre and exhibited visual art.

In 2019, Vaughan returned to New Brunswick as writer-in-residence at the University of New Brunswick for the 2019–2020 academic year.

== Personal life ==
Vaughan was openly gay, and LGBTQ themes appeared frequently in his writing and criticism. He lived and worked in various cities including Toronto, Berlin, and Montreal before returning to New Brunswick as writer-in-residence at the University of New Brunswick in 2019.

== Death ==
In October 2020, Vaughan was reported missing in Fredericton, New Brunswick, prompting public appeals for information by police. He was found deceased on October 23, 2020. Police stated that no foul play was suspected.

== Legacy ==
Following his death, the R. M. Vaughan Memorial Scholarship was established at the University of New Brunswick to support students in creative writing, with preference given to LGBTQ2S+ students. Vaughan’s novel Pervatory was published posthumously in 2023 by Coach House Books.

== Awards and honours ==
- Playwright-in-residence, Buddies in Bad Times Theatre (1994–1995)
- Dora Mavor Moore Award nomination (1996)
- ReLit Award (Poetry) shortlist (2010), Troubled: A Memoir in Poems
- The Globe and Mail Top 100 Books selections for Troubled and Bright Eyed

== Bibliography ==
=== Poetry ===
- A Selection of Dazzling Scarves (1996)
- Invisible to Predators (1999)
- Ruined Stars (2004)
- Troubled: A Memoir in Poems (2008)

=== Novels ===
- A Quilted Heart (1998)
- Spells (2003)
- Pervatory (2023, posthumous)

=== Drama ===
- Camera, Woman (2001)
- The Monster Trilogy (2003)

=== Non-fiction ===
- Compared to Hitler: Selected Essays (2013)
- Bright Eyed: Insomnia and Its Cultures (2015)
