= Dana Michel =

- Born: Ottawa, Canada
- Education: Concordia University
- Known for: Dance
- Website: www.dana-michel.com

Dana Michel (born in Ottawa) is a choreographer and performer based in Montreal. She is part of the contemporary dance company Par B.L.eux founded by Benoît Lachambre.

== Biography ==
Prior to her dance career, Dana Michel was a marketing executive, competitive runner and football player. She obtained a Bachelor of Fine Arts degree in contemporary dance from Concordia University in 2006.

In 2018, Michel became the first contemporary dance artist in residence at the National Arts Centre in Ottawa, Canada. She also completed a residency at Usine C, in Montreal.

Her first solo performance Yellow Towel was listed in 2013 as one of the "Top Five" dance moments in Voir magazine (Montreal) and among the "Top Ten" in Dance Current magazine. Other solo works include Mercurial George and Cutlass Spring.

The New York Times listed Dana Michel as one of the most notable choreographers of the year in 2014.

== Awards ==
In 2011, Michel was a recipient of the DanceWEB scholarship in Vienna, Austria. In 2014, Michel was awarded the ImPulsTanz Award (Vienna) which recognizes outstanding artistic achievements. In 2017, she received the Silver Lion award for innovation in dance at the Venice Biennale, and in 2019 she was awarded the ANTI Festival International Prize for Live Art (Kuopio, Finland).

== Dana Michel in a performance art at the Modern Museum in Stockholm 2024 ==
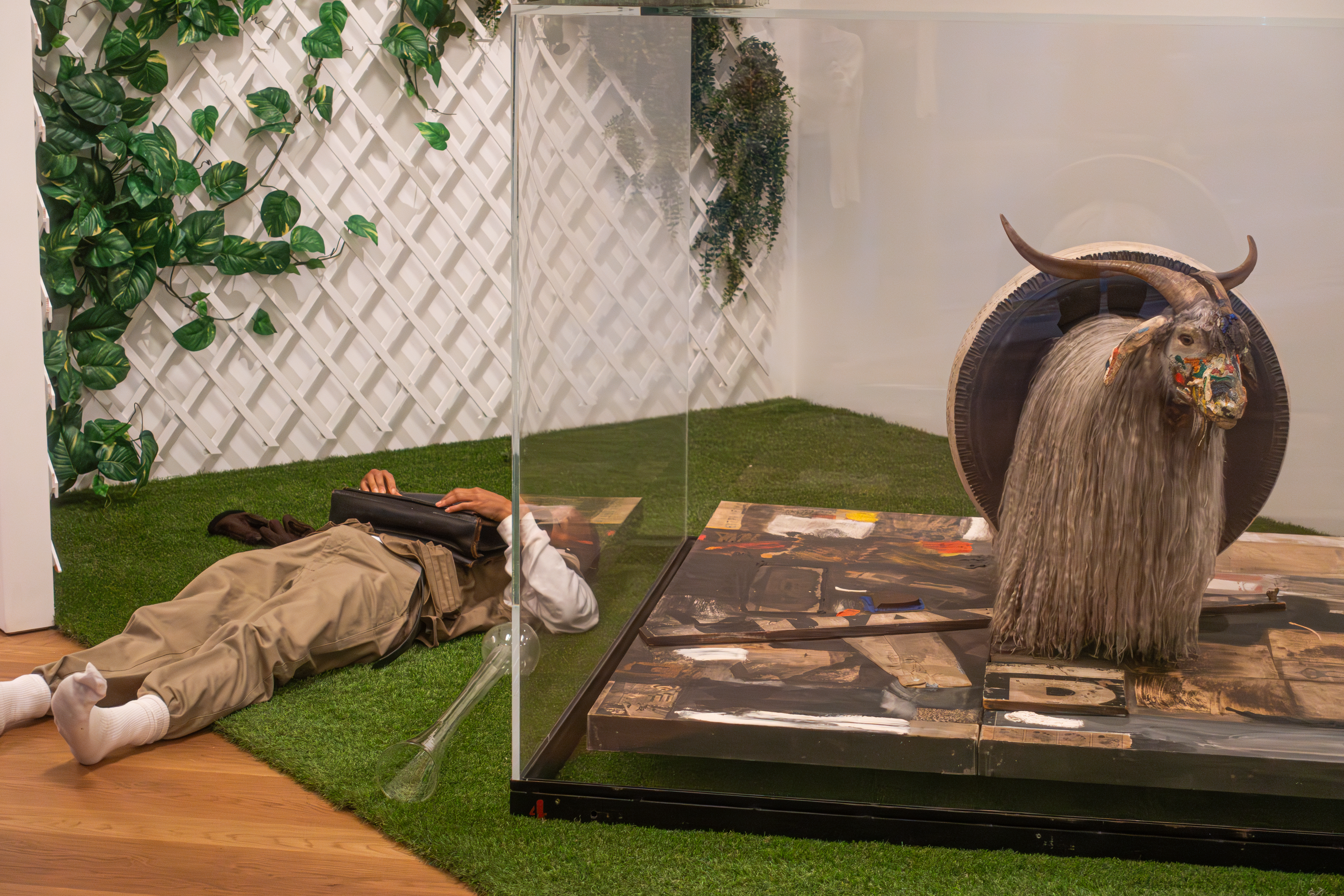

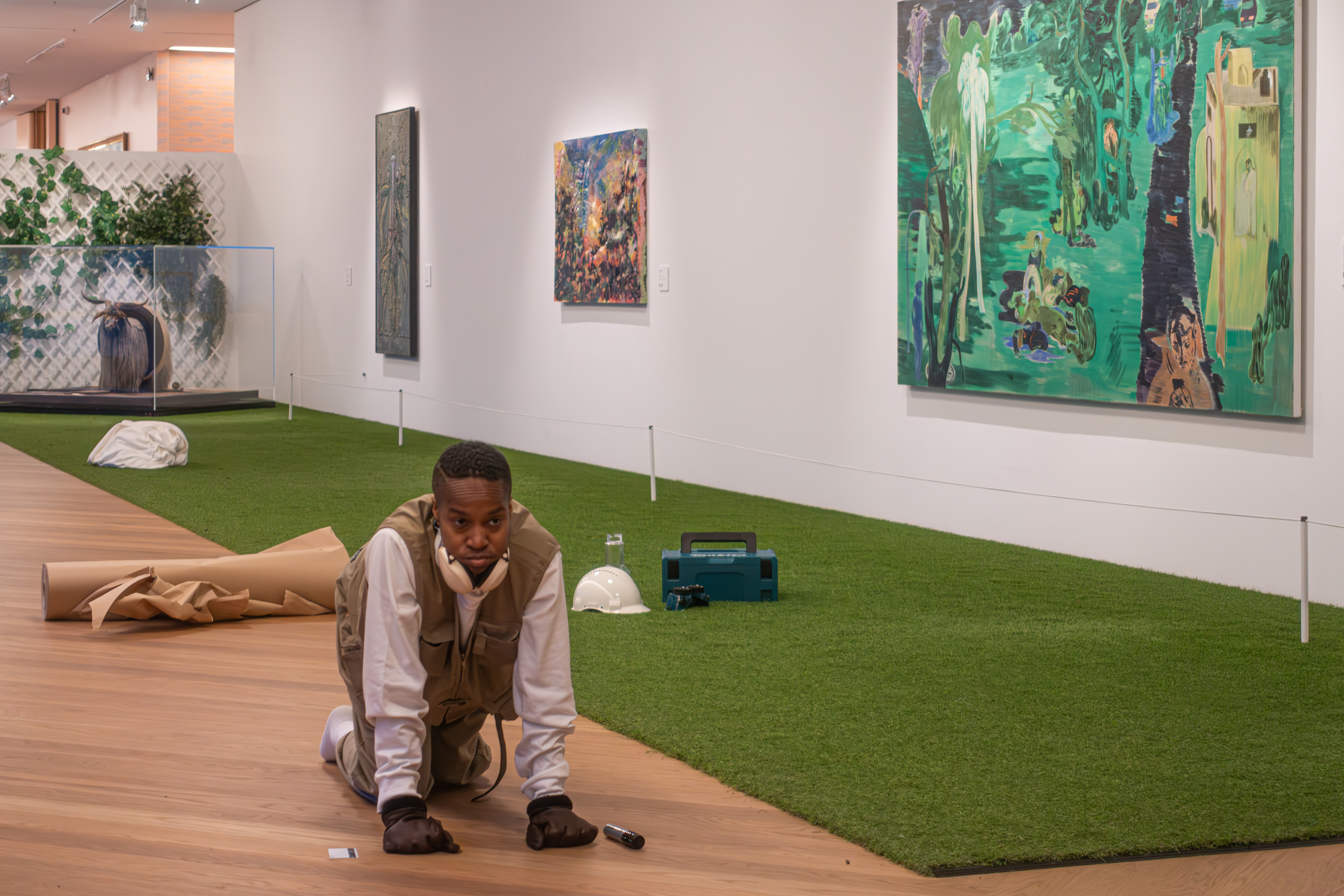

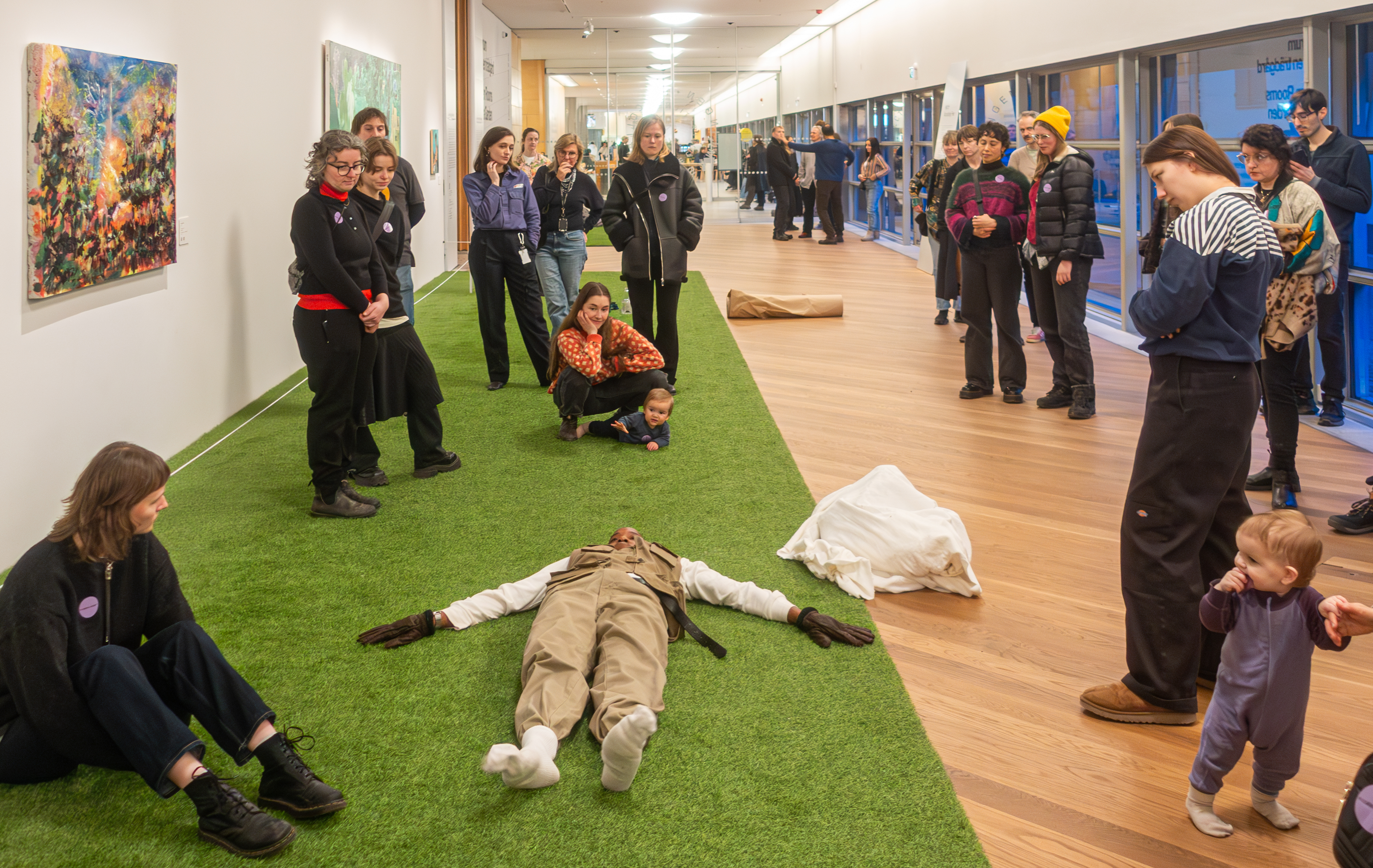

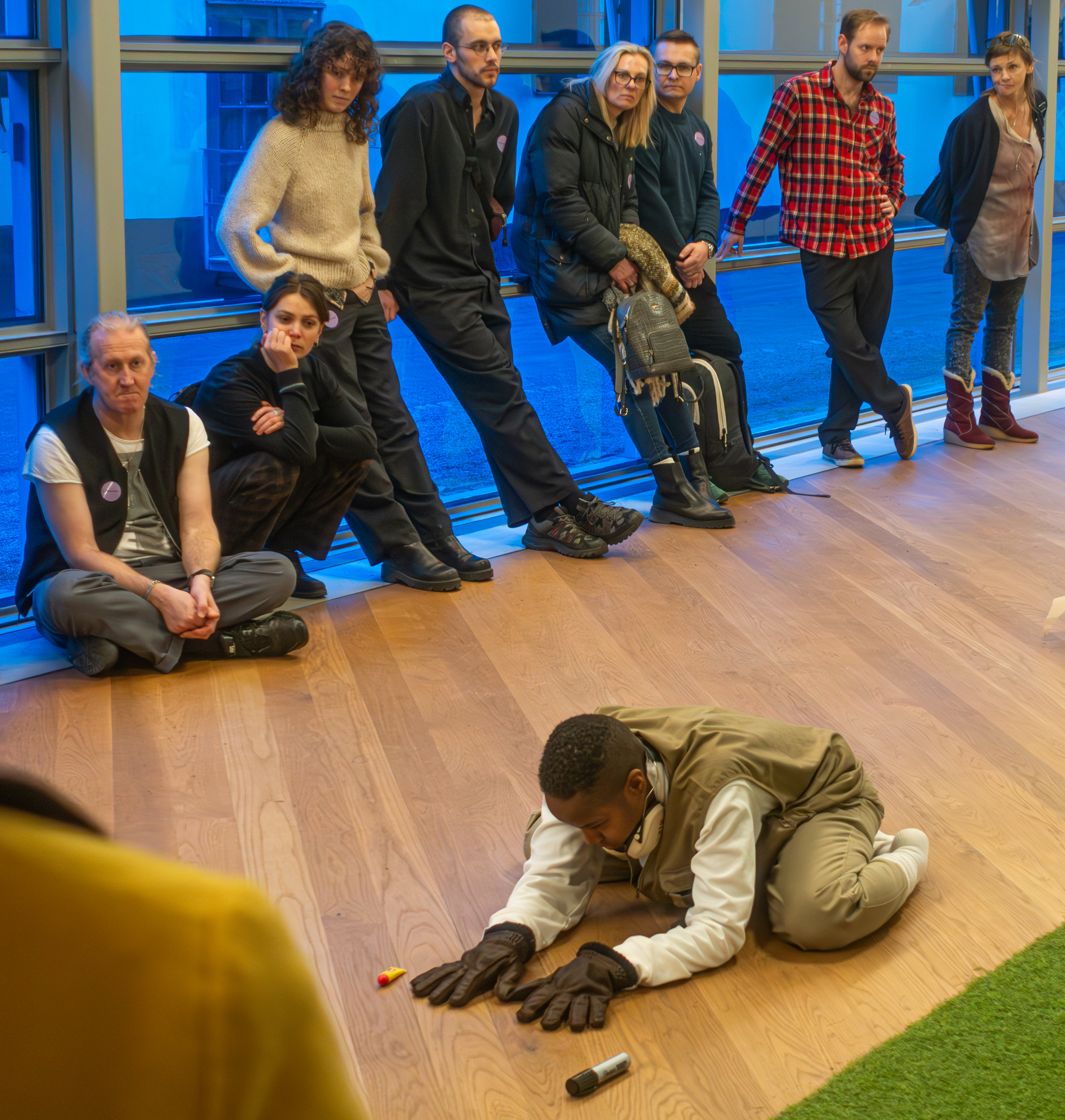
