= Will Munro =

Canadian artist

- Born: William Grant Munro; February 11, 1975; Sydney, Australia
- Died: May 21, 2010 (aged 35); Toronto, Ontario, Canada
- Education: OCAD University
- Known for: artist who made Assemblage, silkscreens, collage, and wearable art

William Grant Munro (February 11, 1975 – May 21, 2010) was a Toronto artist, club promoter, and restaurateur known for his work as a community builder among disparate Toronto groups. As a visual artist, he was known for fashioning artistic works out of underwear; as a club promoter, he was best known for his long-running Toronto queer club night, Vazaleen.

Born in Australia, Munro grew up mostly in Mississauga, Ontario, Canada, and moved to nearby Toronto to study at OCAD University, graduating in 2000. Influenced by such artists as General Idea and the queercore movement, he received critical attention for his work with men's underwear, a medium he used eventually to create collages of colourful performers he admired such as Klaus Nomi and Leigh Bowery. He created silkscreen posters to advertise Vazaleen—his monthly nightclub party that was unusual for being a queer event where punk and other rock music was prominently played, and for being one of the first to exist beyond the confines of the gay ghetto. The party was known for attracting a diverse crowd, and at its peak brought in such performers as Nina Hagen; international "best-of" nightclub lists took notice.

Munro died of a spinal cord infection caused by brain cancer in May 2010. Posthumous exhibits of his art work included a 2010 show at the Art Gallery of Ontario, and in 2011 he was the first male artist to be featured in the feminist Montreal art gallery La Centrale.

== Personal life ==
Will Munro was born in Sydney, Australia in 1975. Later that year his family moved to Canada, just outside Montreal, and then lived in Mississauga, Ontario from 1980 onwards.

Despite his involvement in nightclub events, Munro did not consume alcohol or recreational drugs. He was a vegan from a young age. For many years, he volunteered as a peer counsellor at the Toronto Lesbian Gay Bi Trans Youth Line, where an annual award was established in his honour after his death.

Munro was diagnosed with brain cancer and underwent surgery to remove a tumour in 2008. A second surgery was performed in October 2009. He entered into palliative care in April 2010, and died on May 21, 2010.

== Art career ==
Munro moved from Mississauga to Toronto after high school, to attend OCAD University. From early on in his career, his signature medium was pastiche work with men's underwear. The origins of this work date back to his Intro to Sculpture class at OCAD, where his professor asked the students to "bring a special object to class that isn't really functional, but is special to you." Munro had long had an affinity for special underwear, ever since his mother had refused to buy him Underoos superhero underwear when he was a child; regarding white briefs, he said, "They were clinical and sterile. They weren't very sexy. It just felt very repressed. I wanted Underoos so bad." For the sculpture class, Munro decided to bring in a pair of underwear that he had stolen from a high school friend on whom he had a crush. He put the grey underwear on display in a Plexiglass cage, complete with air holes. In his subsequent work he decided to use white briefs as a medium "because they were so accessible." The summer after his sculpture class, to keep himself busy on a road trip, he made a quilt out of white underwear. In 1997, his first show involving underwear was held in a gallery supported by his college. The show received publicity after conservative columnist Michael Coren, in the Toronto Sun and on the radio, criticized Munro and his show, in particular for having said that it involved "boys' underwear" (although Munro had simply meant guys' underwear). Coren asked the public to bring dirty diapers to the exhibit, but no one did. Munro went on to have many showings of his underwear art, mostly "rescued" from second-hand Goodwill clothing outlets, including at Who's Emma, HEADspace, and Paul Petro Contemporary Art. Actor Selma Blair bought one of Munro's underwear works when she was in town for the 2004 Toronto International Film Festival.

Munro's influences included the work of General Idea, and the queercore movement. Speaking about the confluence of his music events and his art, Munro said in 2004, "This is where the music scene and gay underground come together. We're at a time when all kinds of shifts are happening. The structure of artists' galleries are changing. Magazines are changing. There's more different kinds of artist activity that's happening. All this is having an impact on my visual work. And my visual work is more and more going into performance." Galleries exhibiting his work have included Art in General, in New York City, Confederation Centre Art Gallery in Charlottetown, and Toronto galleries Zsa Zsa, Mercer Union, YYZ Artists' Outlet, Paul Petro Contemporary Art, and the Art Gallery of York University. Munro was named on the longlist of finalists for the Sobey Art Award in 2010.

A posthumous exhibit of his work, "Total Eclipse", was presented at the Art Gallery of Ontario in 2010. Works included collages, made from underwear, that depict Klaus Nomi and Leigh Bowery, both of whom Munro admired. Reviewing the show in Canadian Art, critic Sholem Krishtalka wrote that Munro's work is "insistent on the necessity of self-made culture and buttressed by an encyclopedic knowledge of queer underground cultural history."

Other posthumous exhibitions of his work include a 2011 show at the feminist La Centrale gallery in Montreal—a first for a male artist in that space—and in 2012 a major retrospective at the Art Gallery of York University.

== Club promoter and community builder ==
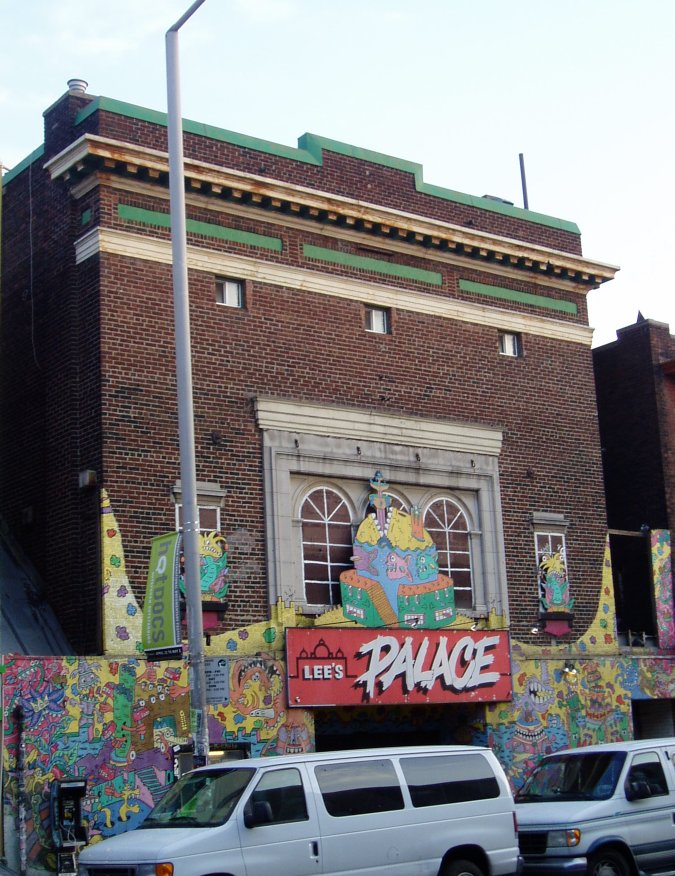
Lee's Palace, the location of Munro's monthly Vazaleen parties from 2001–06

Munro started the monthly party Vaseline (later renamed Vazaleen) in Toronto at a time when most gay clubs featured house music or other types of dance music. His hope was to draw a more diverse crowd: he said at the time, "I'd like to do something that'll encompass all the freaks out there, myself included." In addition to its stereotype-countering incorporation of punk and other rock music, his club night was also noted to be unusual for being located outside of the Church and Wellesley gay neighbourhood. It was atypical as well for having about 50 percent women attending the event. Munro said, "I was determined to get women to attend and I did it in a really simple way. I put lots of images of women and dyke icons on the posters and flyers—groups like The Runaways or singers like Nina Hagen and Carole Pope. I wanted women to know instantly that this was their space as much as anybody else's." It began in the downstairs space at El Mocambo in late 1999, moved to the upstairs space in January 2000, and in late 2001, when El Mocambo was threatening to close, to Lee's Palace, where it continued as a monthly event until 2006; it continues to this day as an annual event as part the city's Pride Week festivities, to raise money for the Will Munro Fund for Queer and Trans People Living with Cancer.

In a lengthy article about Vazaleen in Toronto Life, critic R. M. Vaughan wrote, "In its lewd, spontaneous, hysterical and glamorous way, Vazaleen defined a new Toronto aesthetic, a playful and endlessly inventive mode of presentation that encompassed everything from lesbian prog- rock to tranny camp to vintage punk revival to good old-fashioned loud-mouthed drag." In an editorial in C magazine, Amish Morrell wrote, "At [Vazaleen] it was not only okay to be gay, but it was okay to be other than gay. One could be just about anything. The effect was that it completely destabilized all preconceptions of gender and sexual identity, in a hyperlibidinous environment where everyone became a performer." Benjamin Boles of Now wrote, "These days it's normal in Toronto for hip gay scenes to flourish outside of the queer ghetto and to attract a wide spectrum of genders and orientations, but that didn't really happen until Vazaleen took off and became a veritable community for everyone who didn't fit into the mainstream homo world. For too long, it was too rare to see dykes, fags, trans people, and breeders hanging out together, and Munro changed that." Vazaleen became a launching pad for such musical acts as Peaches and Lesbians on Ecstasy. Other bands performing at Vazaleen early in their careers were The Hidden Cameras, Crystal Castles, and The Gossip. At the height of the event's popularity, Munro appeared on the cover of Now magazine (made up to look similar to David Bowie's Aladdin Sane album cover), musical guests included Carole Pope, Tracy + the Plastics, Vaginal Davis, Glen Meadmore and Nina Hagen, and Vazaleen appeared on "best-of" nightclub lists internationally.

Munro produced other Toronto club nights such as Peroxide, which featured electro music, No T. O., which showcased No Wave, Seventh Heaven Dream Disco, and the amateur stripper party Moustache. In 2006, Munro and his friend Lynn MacNeil bought The Beaver Café, in the West Queen West neighbourhood. Arts columnist Murray Whyte of the Toronto Star wrote, "Will's virtual status as hub took bricks-and-mortar form: The Beaver quickly became that cozy, everyone-in-the-pool house party, a sort of community hall/mini dance club, and an alt-culture oasis". "Love Saves the Day" became Munro's dance music night at The Beaver, which he continued to organize even as his illness began to prevent him from leaving home. His final night of DJing in person was at a special Halloween Vazaleen party at Lee's Palace in 2009.

Bruce LaBruce wrote of Munro's impact on Toronto, just prior to his death: "As we all know, Toronto can be a cruel and unforgiving city. What makes Will Munro so extraordinary as an artist and as a person is that he has not only remained true to such a harsh mistress, but that he has also contributed so substantially to the fabric and heft of this often maleficent metropolis. His dedication to community work (including volunteering for a decade at an LGBT youth crisis hotline) and to creating social and sexual stimulation for the queer community outside the decaying gay ghetto (namely, his wonderfully raunchy club night, Vazaleen, and his participation as a founding partner in revitalizing the Beaver Café) is unmatched."

In 2013, Toronto-based writer Sarah Liss published Army of Lovers: A Community History of Will Munro, a book which collected reminiscences about Munro from his family, friends and colleagues. The book's launch party, dubbed Vaza-Launch, featured performances by both Peaches and Light Fires. The book is divided into three parts (Mississauga Goddam, Rock Show, and Heaven), which all work to highlight what an extraordinary talent Munro had for community cultivation. It begins with Munro's childhood spent in Mississauga, which both of his parents state that Munro and his brother, Dave, "hated Mississauga." (pg. 16) Dave Munro recalls that Will experienced a sudden shift in personality in or slightly before grade seven, where he became a different person: "Will was like, 'Fuck doing after-school-programs,' and started down his own path" (pg. 23).
