= Calvin Gimpelevich =

American writer

Calvin Gimpelevich is an American writer. He is the founder of the T4T Reading Series in Boston, Massachusetts, and a founding member of the Lion's Main Art Collective in Seattle, Washington. He was born in San Francisco, and has lived around the West Coast and in Cambridge, Massachusetts.

== Education ==
Gimpelevich received a Bachelor of Arts from University of California, Santa Cruz in 2012.

== Writing ==
Gimpelevich is the author of the short story collection Invasions (Instar Books, 2018), a Lambda Literary Awards finalist.

His writing has also appeared in Los Angeles Review of Books, Ploughshares, The Kenyon Review, Electric Literature, Literary Hub, A Public Space, Joyland, The Stinging Fly, Cream City Review, Them, The Account, and elsewhere.

He has been anthologized in The Best American Essays 2022 (HarperCollins, 2022), Meanwhile, Elsewhere: Science Fiction and Fantasy from Transgender Writers (LittlePuss Press, 2021), and The Collection: Short Fiction from the Transgender Vanguard (Topside Press, 2012).

Gimpelevich works in both fiction and nonfiction. Common themes in his writing include ways that class and technologies operate on queer bodies and relationships; transgression; morality; and the fluidity of perception and identity. His fiction operates at the intersection of speculative fiction and literary realism.

== T4T and Lion's Mane ==
In 2023, Gimpelevich founded the T4T Reading Series, a monthly event in Boston that spotlights published transgender authors. Gimpelevich ran the series from 2023 to 2025. Past featured readers include McKenzie Wark, Emily Zhou, Jeanne Thornton, Andrea Lawlor, Denne Michele Norris, Torrey Peters, Imogen Binnie, Casey Plett, Jordy Rosenberg, Cameron Awkward-Rich, and others.

He is also a founding member of the Lion's Main Art Collective for Queer and Trans Artists, a Seattle-based group of artists working across a variety of media, which has exhibited together and organized events at cultural institutions since 2013.

== Awards and distinctions ==
Gimpelevich is a 2022 NEA Fellow and a recipient of the 2020 Markowitz Emerging Writers Award from Lambda Literary.

His work has been recognized by Artist Trust, Jack Straw Cultural Center, 4Culture, CODEX/Writer's Block, Studios at Mass MoCA, the Kimmel Harding Nelson Center for the Arts, the Speculative Literature Foundation, and Woodward Residency.

His webcomic, Wolfmen, was awarded the 2014 Prism Comics Queer Press Grant.
