= Torrey Peters =

American author (born 1981)

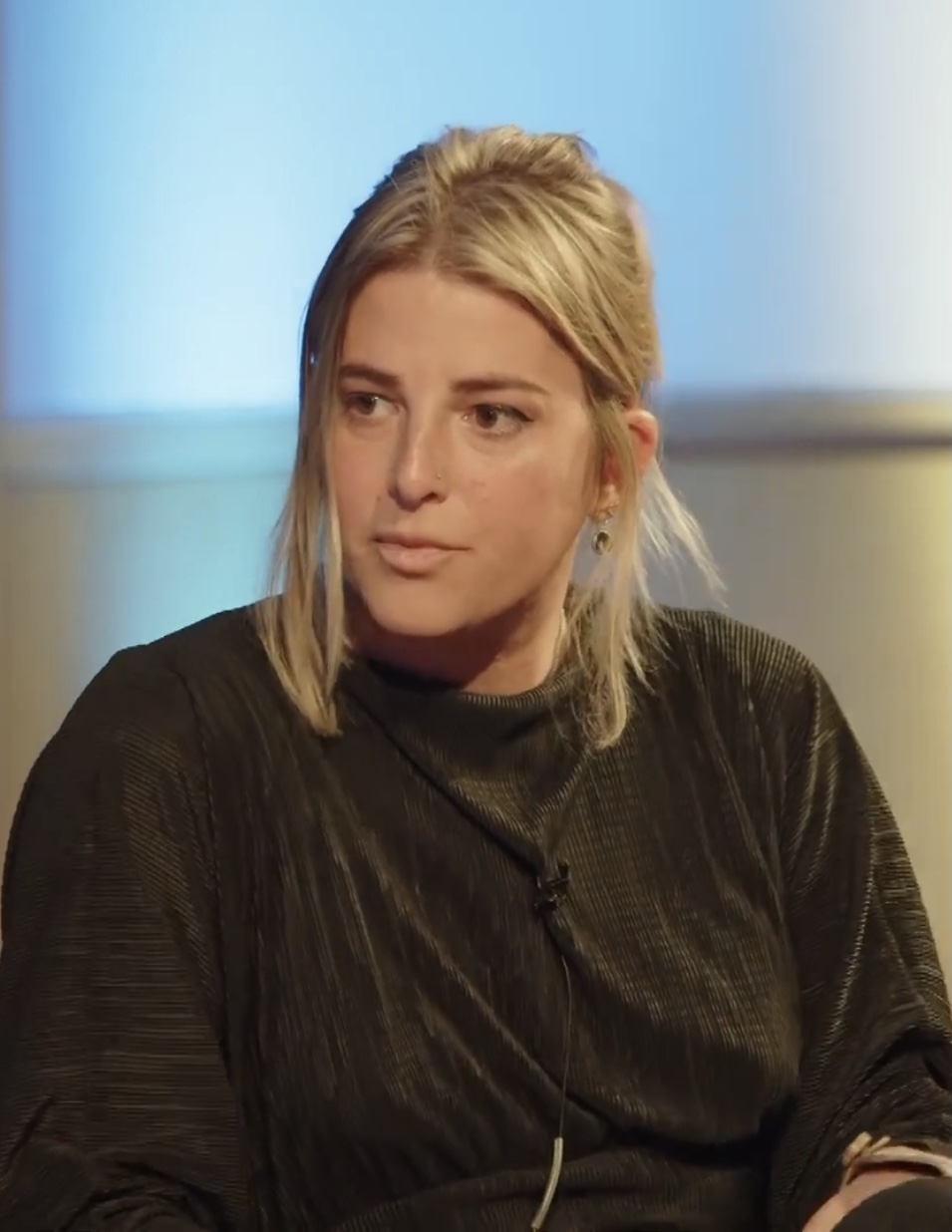
- Peters at the British Library in 2022
- Born: July 1981 (age 45); Evanston, Illinois, U.S.
- Education: Hampshire College (BA); University of Iowa (MFA); Dartmouth College (MA)
- Writing career
- Genre: Fiction
- Notable works: Detransition, Baby; Stag Dance
- Website: Official website

Torrey Peters (born July 1981) is an American author. Her debut novel, Detransition, Baby, has received mainstream and critical success. The novel was nominated for the 2021 Women's Prize for Fiction and won the 2022 PEN/Hemingway Award.

Her second book, Stag Dance, was a finalist for the 2026 Pulitzer Prize.

== Early life and education ==
Peters was born in Evanston, Illinois. Her father was a professor and her mother was a lawyer. Peters says she grew up in a community that was not very religious or socially liberal, and she did not know the word "trans" until she was an adult.

She grew up in Chicago, later attending Hampshire College. During her young adulthood, she traveled to the Dominican Republic as an exchange student, and later lived in Cameroon and Uganda. She graduated from the University of Iowa with an MFA, and from Dartmouth College with an MA in Comparative Literature.

== Career ==
=== Early writing and self-publishing ===
In 2012, when Peters was at the University of Iowa, she published a biographical essay for Gawker called "The Crossdressing Room". Peters had not yet transitioned and later regarded this piece as dishonest, more interested in hunting for acceptance from her audience rather than seeking out truths. After initial interest in expanding this essay into a book dwindled because an agency thought it would not connect with a "mainstream" audience, Peters stopped writing for some time.

Peters moved to Brooklyn in 2015 to join the Topside Press trans literary scene. She was inspired to join after reading their influential novel Nevada by Imogen Binnie, and meeting Tom Léger, Topside's editor. During this time she began shaping her writing to primarily speak to an audience of trans women, rather than sanitizing her tone to cater to a cisgender audience.

Peters wanted to promote a wider trans literary scene by encouraging writers to self-publish novellas using shared classes and resources. She spent half a year setting up and sharing her methods, and began publishing her first two novellas this way. She shared them widely for free download from her website and online trans communities, or for variable prices in small-run print editions. Her novellas eventually built a cult following and sold in the thousands, but she was disappointed when nobody else joined her in the project. Later, she reflected that more authors were following this method, but it had just taken five years.

Peters has written reviews for a breadth of transgender and gender non-conforming authors, such as Janet Mock, Akwaeke Emezi, and Casey Plett, who have published books through Arsenal Pulp Press, Metonymy, and Topside Press.

=== Novellas ===
Peters's first two self-published novellas, The Masker and Infect Your Friends and Loved Ones, were published online in 2016 and reviewed by writer Harron Walker for them. Peters planned these novellas as part of her project to promote a culture of self-publishing amongst trans writers. She wanted to create a series of novellas that discussed trans issues from different genres, with The Masker embracing horror, Infect Your Friends and Loved Ones being science fiction, and Detransition, Baby a planned soap opera novella. As Detransition, Baby grew to novel-length, Peters temporarily published a single chapter from it as the standalone novella Glamour Boutique.

The Masker is about a person contemplating transitioning from male to female. The novella's main character, Krys, is a sissy who is choosing between living out her forced feminization fantasies or undertaking the transition process.

Infect Your Friends and Loved Ones is set in a dystopian future where bioterrorism has destroyed the body's ability to produce sex hormones and follows Patient Zero and her cat-and-mouse relationship with Lexi, a working-class, gun-obsessed trans girl.

Glamour Boutique, Peters's third novella, explores a casual Craigslist encounter at a crossdressers' boutique store. This novella explores the differences between dissociation and fantasy, and was excerpted from Peters' larger work, Detransition, Baby.

In 2021, it was announced that Infect Your Friends and Loved Ones and The Masker would be reissued by Random House in 2022 and would be published in a collection under the title Infect Your Friends and Loved Ones. Emily Zhou credited Peters' novellas as inspirations for her 2023 short story collection Girlfriends.

=== Detransition, Baby ===
Peters' debut novel, Detransition, Baby, published by Penguin Random House Profile Books in 2021, was met with critical success and praise for crafting an exploration of gender, parenthood, and love. The main characters are Reese, a trans woman working in PR and former partner of Amy; Amy, who detransitions and becomes Ames; and Katrina, a Chinese Jewish woman who is Ames' boss and pregnant with his child.

This book was the first time Peters published with a mainstream publisher, and it was also one of the first times that a "big five" publisher would release a novel by an out trans author. Peters previously had ignored mainstream publishing, asserting that these companies chose not to support trans women. She says that they only wanted "trans 101" primers for cisgender audiences, rather than real trans literature, and that this was a strict limit until the mid-2010s, and continued to be a heavy barrier until at least 2021. However, after seeing some of the first cases of large institutions supporting the success of unabashedly trans media, with Transparent, Pose, and them, Peters thought it might be time to work with a large publisher so she could reach more readers. The dedicated following of her self-published novellas gave some editors an interest in buying her upcoming book, and she included a two page letter to publishers explaining that they could market her book similarly to how they had always marketed women's fiction, and they did not need to "freak out" over publishing an explicitly trans story.

Detransition, Baby was nominated for the 2021 Women's Prize for Fiction, making Peters the first openly trans woman nominated for the award. The longlisting of Peters was met with some controversy from those who did not consider her to be a woman. A letter argued that she is "male" and therefore should not be eligible for the prize. Its list of signatories included atheist writer Ophelia Benson and environmentalist Rebecca Lush, but as a rhetorical strategy the letter also included long-dead writers such as Emily Dickinson and Willa Cather. Authors including Melinda Salisbury, Joanne Harris, and Naoise Dolan—another nominee for the 2021 prize—condemned the letter and expressed their support for Peters. The organisers of the prize released a statement condemning the letter and defending the decision to nominate Peters' book.

=== Stag Dance ===
In 2025, Stag Dance, a collection containing a novel and three short stories by Peters, was published by Penguin Random House. It was a finalist for the 2026 Pulitzer Prize.

== Personal life ==
Peters came out as transgender at age 26, and began taking hormones to physically transition at age 30. In her 20s, Peters was in a relationship with Olive Minor and had come out as trans to her but decided to not transition to avoid straining their relationship. Peters and Minor married in 2009, and Peters later recounted that she occasionally experimented with gender presentation during this time, conceptualizing days of experimentation as a "safety valve" so she could be a "good husband the rest of the time".

In 2010, the pair lived in Kampala, Uganda while Minor, a PhD student, worked on an ethnography of Uganda's only lesbian bar. Minor interviewed the bar's patrons during the same year Uganda debated the proposed 2009 Anti-Homosexuality Bill, which would increase punishments against gay and trans individuals. Many of Minor's friends in Uganda were queer activists, and they increasingly were targeted with tabloid coverage and physical violence. The assassination of David Kato started a significant period of fear for their friends and the larger queer community in Uganda. Peters did not express her gender at this time, presenting as a man in a heterosexual relationship with Minor. Peters later wrote about the personal impact of hiding her gender at this time:

"But the more I leaned into masculinity, the more opaque I became to myself. My internal landscape desaturated. Sussing my own emotions was like feeling for lost objects on the bottom of a murky pond. Affection withered before I could express it."

The strain of suppressing her gender caused Peters to leave Kampala while Minor completed her research. Peters and Minor divorced in 2015 but remained close friends. Peters then briefly dated Tom Léger, the editor of Topside Press.

As of September 2021, Peters lived in New York with her wife, whom she married that month. That year, they worked on renovating an off-the-grid log cabin they bought in Vermont. They split their time between Brooklyn and Vermont.

As of 2025, Peters lives in Santa Marta, Colombia.

== Awards ==
Year	Title	Award	Category	Result	Ref.
2017	Infect Your Friends and Loved Ones	Otherwise Award	—	Longlisted	
2021	Detransition, Baby	National Book Critics Circle Award	John Leonard Prize	Shortlisted	
2021	Detransition, Baby	Women's Prize for Fiction	—	Longlisted	
2022	Detransition, Baby	BookTube Prize	Fiction	Octofinalist	
2022	Detransition, Baby	British Book Awards	Discover Book of the Year 2022 Shortlist	Shortlisted	
2022	Detransition, Baby	Lambda Literary Award	Transgender Fiction	Shortlisted	
2022	Detransition, Baby	PEN/Hemingway Award	—	Won	
2022	Detransition, Baby	Publishing Triangle Awards	Leslie Feinberg Award	Shortlisted	
2022	Detransition, Baby	Gotham Book Prize	Fiction	Finalist	
2026	Stag Dance	Pulitzer Prize	Fiction	Finalist	

== Works ==
- Infect Your Friends and Loved Ones (2016)
- The Masker (2016)
- Glamour Boutique (2017)
- Detransition, Baby (2021)
- Stag Dance (2025)

== See also ==
- Calvin Gimpelevich
- Emily St. James
- Jeanne Thornton
- Kai Cheng Thom
- Mira Bellwether
- Nicola Dinan
- Ryka Aoki
