= Stag Dance (novel) =

2025 book by Torrey Peters

- Author: Torrey Peters
- Language: English
- Genre: Literary fiction, Transgender literature, Short stories
- Publisher: Penguin Random House
- Publication date: March 11, 2025
- Publication place: United States
- Media type: Print
- ISBN: 9780593595640

Stag Dance is a 2025 book by the American writer Torrey Peters, consisting of three short stories and the titular novel. It was published by Penguin Random House.

== Plot ==
=== "Infect Your Friends and Loved Ones" ===
In an apocalyptic near-future Seattle, a pandemic renders humans unable to produce sex hormones.

=== "The Chaser" ===
A boy questions his sexuality as he embarks on an ill-fated relationship with his femme boarding school roommate.

=== "Stag Dance" ===
Babe Bunyan, a large, unattractive lumberjack, decides to attend his winter camp's stag dance as a woman, placing him in a rivalry with the younger, more feminine Lisen.

=== "The Masker" ===
While attending a Las Vegas transfeminine gathering, Krys is forced to confront her own identity when others at the event turn on a guest wearing a full body silicone woman suit.

== Creation ==
Peters began writing the short stories included in Stag Dance in 2016 as an exploration of trans stories across different genres. She planned to self-publish a cycle of novellas, hoping to inspire more trans women to share self-published novellas with each other in a time when few could get published by traditional publishers. Peters wrote each of her novellas in a different existing genre to argue that trans stories can be rich and authentic without requiring the development of a new genre, which some contemporary trans stories had attempted. Thus she self-published Infect your Friends and Loved Ones as a post-apocalyptic story, The Masker as horror, and began writing Detransition, Baby as a melodrama, although it grew into a full novel.

Detransition, Baby was one of the first novels published by a mainstream publisher while written by an out trans author. It gathered a lot of acclaim and success, and cast Peters as the "latest de facto face of trans lit". It also elicited criticism from some trans people who were concerned by whether the story was good representation. Peters later stated that she felt "totally overwhelmed" by the response to her book, and not sure how to write for her new, broader audience and their expectations of her. After Detransition, Baby, she often felt stuck when writing in similar styles. However, Peters returned to her project of writing novellas across genres to explore transgender experiences, and planned to reissue The Masker and Infect your Friends and Loved Ones, along with two new stories, in a collection to be released in 2022. Peters wrote "The Chaser", in the genre of teen romance, as the next piece.

During this time, Peters and her wife worked on developing an off-the-grid cabin in Vermont. As Peters built a sauna there, she began considering lumberjacks and how people perform gender when they are away from others. She stated that she "was thinking about symbols of transition, which I sometimes didn’t have when I was in the woods...What does it mean to have a gender when you’re alone in the woods? Who are you performing for?" She began writing Stag Dance with the goal of creating an "Americana tall tale in a mythic sense". She felt freed from the weight of her audience's expectations by the esoteric nature of the subject, and spent over a year experimenting and developing the story. She researched the culture of loggers around the turn of the 20th century, from the slang they used to the evolution of their tools.

Peters declared a shift in her writing's intended audience throughout writing the four stories, broadening her notice from trans readers to anyone who she shares an affinity with. As she edited her earlier novellas into the collection's short stories, she realized that they were more "punk", with emotion she thought fit the 2025 landscape better than when they were first published. She also felt like the burden of being labeled a "spokesperson" for trans people had been lifted because far more trans authors were publishing with mainstream publishers.

== Themes ==
Peters stated that all four stories in the collection question the cis-trans binary, where people assume there is a clear distinction between cis and trans characters and experiences. She stated that all four stories in the collection contain certain key "building blocks" of trans experience that are also universal elements of the human experience. These include the way people perform and present themselves, their desire for their loved ones to recognize them as they want to be seen, how people work through shame, and when someone yearns to be with someone else.

Distinctive logging industry slang is a key part of Stag Dance's novella and a tool that Peters uses to help convey the protagonist's emotions. She used a dictionary of lumberjack lingo to shape the voice of the first three chapters of the novella, and then began to invent her own words to further stylize its culture, taking inspiration from other authors' creativity in voicing the characters of Moby-Dick and Blood Meridian. Peters also felt free to explore concepts on gender in new ways throughout the story because modern terminology had been replaced with period language. Similarly, the genres of each of the collection's short stories allowed Peters to explore gender and trans identities via lenses that create distance from modern discourse. Many of the characters' identities are ambiguous or in the process of transformation.

Stag Dance's novella also includes a historical method of gender transition for lumberjacks, which was to place a triangle of fabric over their crotch to signify their role as a woman. American lumberjacks and soldiers, as noted in books like Re-Dressing America's Frontier Past, have held stag dances for entertainment where men dance with each other. People who wanted to be treated as women during the dance would wear an upside-down brown triangle. Peters wrote about a drastic change in the behavior of Stag Dance's protagonist, Babe, when he decides to wear the triangle. She wanted to portray the experience where people, especially trans people, extend their bodies via objects used as prostheses, including acrylic nails, strap-ons, high heels, and packing.

In the novella, Peters also wanted to explore the very contrasting experiences of transition and gender presentation that people are afforded due to their circumstances, by contrasting Babe's difficulty gaining acceptance as a woman with Lisen's ease at doing the same. In the ending of the story, Peters wanted to portray the consequence of a person's transition denied, using supernatural and monstrous elements to punctuate the story in the vein of another dance story, Carrie.

== Reception ==
In his review for The New York Times, writer Hugh Ryan praised Stag Dance, praising Peters's skill at "plumbing the murky hearts of queer people". In The Washington Post, Ilana Masad also commended the book, arguing "Peters’s book is important, but putting aside for a moment the weight of that unasked-for responsibility, Stag Dance is a marvelous follow-up to a tremendous debut". Writer Lauren J Joseph praised the book in The Guardian, noting its ability to maintain cohesion across diverse stories, and comparing it to Mariana Enríquez's short story collection Things We Lost in the Fire.

Kirkus Reviews was more mixed on the book, writing that the titular story "feels interminable at novel length", before ultimately concluding that "even when Peters’ experiments don't pay off, it's exciting to read an author willing to take these risks".

Stag Dance was a finalist for the 2026 Pulitzer Prize for Fiction.

== Film adaptation ==
A film adaptation is being developed by Run-A-Muck, a media company founded by Pamela Drucker Mann, Ilene Chaiken, and Jennifer Beals.

== See also ==
- Get in Trouble
- God Loves Hair
- Girlfriends
- Meanwhile, Elsewhere
- Realistic Fiction
- The Trans Space Octopus Congregation
- Woodworking
