= Meanwhile, Elsewhere =

2017 anthology edited by Casey Plett and Cat Fitzpatrick

Meanwhile, Elsewhere: Science Fiction and Fantasy from Transgender Writers
- Editor: Cat Fitzpatrick, Casey Plett
- Language: English
- Genre: Speculative Fiction, Transgender literature, Short stories
- Publisher: Topside Press
- Publication date: 2017
- Publication place: United States
- Media type: Print
- ISBN: 978-1-62729-018-0

Meanwhile, Elsewhere: Science Fiction and Fantasy from Transgender Writers is a 2017 speculative fiction anthology by transgender authors, including Imogen Binnie, Jeanne Thornton, Ryka Aoki, and Trish Salah. The collection was edited by Cat Fitzpatrick and Casey Plett, and published originally by Topside Press. When Topside disbanded, Plett and Fitzpatrick created LittlePuss Press to continue printing the work.

Meanwhile, Elsewhere is one of the first speculative fiction anthologies written by trans writers. It won the 2018 Barbara Gittings Literature Award, a Stonewall Book Award.

== Contents ==
Meanwhile, Elsewhere: Science Fiction and Fantasy from Transgender Writers is an anthology of speculative fiction from transgender authors. Some stories explore the intersection of transgender identity and disability or race, and other themes include queer love and family, dysphoria, medical and reproductive technology, cross-generational infighting, coming out and growing up pains, anti-trans violence, and suicide. The collection has fewer explorations of nonbinary identity.

The book is dedicated: "For Rachel Pollack, who's been doing this for over forty years". Its short stories are:

- "Control": Rachel K. Zall
- "Delicate Bodies": Bridget Liang
- "What Cheer": RJ Edwards
- "Satan, Are You There? It's Me, Laura": Aisling Fae
- "It Can Grow!!!": Trish Salah
- "Rent, Don't Sell": Calvin Gimpelevich
- "No Comment": Ayșe Devrim
- "Control Shift Down": Paige Bryony
- "After The Big One": Cooper Lee Bombardier
- "Using A Treadmill, You Can Run Until Exhaustion Without Moving": Sadie Avery
- "Notes From A Hunter Boy": Beckett K. Bauer
- "Themyscira": Colette Arrand
- "Cybervania": Sybil Lamb
- "Under The Rainbow": Janey Lovebomb
- "Heat Death Of Western Human Arrogance": M Téllez
- "Thieves And Lovers": Emma Addams
- "Matchmaker": Dane Figueroa Edidi
- "Schwaberow, Ohio": Brendan Williams-Childs
- "It's Called Fashion": Kaj Worth
- "Gamers": Imogen Binnie
- "Imago": Tristan Alice Nieto
- "Kid Ghost": Nat Buchbinder
- "The Gift": Ryka Aoki
- "Visions": Morgan M Page
- "Angels Are Here To Help You": Jeanne Thornton

== Creation ==
During the 2010s Cat Fitzpatrick was an editor with Topside Press, an influential trans press that began in 2012. She envisioned creating a speculative fiction anthology with Topside because she wanted to revive a long tradition of trans speculative fiction authorship. She was inspired by the writing of Rachel Pollack, who the anthology would eventually be dedicated to. She also wanted Topside to produce successful political writing, in the way that Ursula K. Le Guin and others in the second-wave feminist movement had used speculative fiction. Finally, Fitzpatrick thought the genre would appeal to many trans readers, and she wanted to help reclaim its feminist traditions from trans-exclusionary currents, as in the writing of Joanna Russ.

Fitzpatrick had previously met fellow editor Casey Plett in the early 2010s at a writer's conference: both felt they grew as writers during that decade, which Plett labels the "trans lit renaissance". Fitzpatrick asked Plett to co-edit her anthology because Plett was skilled at character development. Its title became Meanwhile, Elsewhere: Science Fiction and Fantasy from Transgender Writers.

For the anthology, they chose to include 25 original works by authors who were often well known for queer literature but sometimes new to the genres of science fiction and fantasy. Plett recounted that she and Fitzpatrick received over 300 story submissions for Meanwhile, Elsewhere. The editors hoped to include many works by writers of color as a contrast to Topside Press's previous anthology, The Collection, which mostly included white authors. Jeanne Thornton, one of the contributing writers to Meanwhile, Elsewhere, also helped provide editing guidance.

== Publication ==
Cat Fitzpatrick and Casey Plett published Meanwhile, Elsewhere in 2017 with Topside Press. The press disbanded the same year, and the anthology went out of print. During the COVID-19 pandemic, Fitzpatrick and Plett complained about this loss to Jeanne Thornton, who suggested that the pair could reprint the work themselves. They created LittlePuss Press and reprinted Meanwhile, Elsewhere in 2021, followed by new works like Cecilia Gentili's Faltas: Letters to Everyone in My Hometown Who Isn't My Rapist, and Emily Zhou's Girlfriends.

== Reception ==
Meanwhile, Elsewhere received a Stonewall Book Award in 2018.

Reviews by Strange Horizons and Publishers Weekly said that some stories had plot devices that were clunky for the genre, but that others had refreshing new ideas for science fiction and fantasy. Evelyn Deshane, reviewing for Plenitude, linked the strength of the work's creativity and novelty to the fact that it centered on real trans characters, not treating them as symbols of fantasy for cis readers as in most previous speculative fiction, as Plett explained in a 2015 Walrus piece. Megan Milks, in her Strange Horizons review, praised the large variety of stories that brought quintessentially trans subjects and experiences to speculative fiction, showing "a field of vibrant possibilities" for the future.

== Legacy ==
The collection was one of the first to prioritize science fiction and fantasy written by trans authors. Previously, Kate Bornstein and Caitlin Sullivan's Nearly Roadkill: An Infobahn Erotic Adventure may have been the first speculative fiction trans story written by trans authors, and Brit Mandelo's Beyond Binary: Genderqueer and Sexually Fluid Speculative Fiction covered a collection of queer desire in speculative fiction but did not center trans experience in the same way.

By 2021, Charlie Jane Anders cited Meanwhile, Elsewhere, as part of a thriving movement of trans and nonbinary speculative fiction. The Transcendent series also focused on trans speculative fiction, and some authors, like Nino Cipri and Bogi Takács, released their own collections of short stories in the genre.

== See also ==
- Both/And: Essays by Trans and Gender-Nonconforming Writers of Color
- Light from Uncommon Stars
- New Suns: Original Speculative Fiction by People of Color
- Pet
- Stag Dance
- The Sapling Cage
