= Leslie Feinberg Award =

Literary award for books with transgender themes

- Awarded for: Transgender and gender variant literature
- Sponsored by: Publishing Triangle
- Reward: US$1,000
- Established: 2016
- Website: https://publishingtriangle.org/awards/trans-gender-variant-literature/

The Leslie Feinberg Award for Trans and Gender-Variant Literature (formerly the Publishing Triangle Award for Trans and Gender-Variant Literature) is an annual literary award, presented by Publishing Triangle to honour works of literature on transgender themes.

The award may be presented for work in any genre of literature. To be eligible, a work of poetry or fiction must be written by a transgender or gender variant author, while a work of non-fiction may be written or cowritten by a cisgender writer as long as it addresses transgender themes. The award hopes to elevate outstanding trans literary works, especially those that explore themes like gender identity, the diversity of the trans community, and the lives of trans and gender-nonconforming people.

The award comes with a cash prize of USD1,000.

The award was established in 2016 and renamed in 2023 to honor Leslie Feinberg, an activist and author of works like Stone Butch Blues and Transgender Warriors.

== Recipients ==
Award winners and finalists
Year	Author	Title	Publisher	Result	Ref.
2016	Nathanaël	The Middle Notebookes	Nightboat Books	Winner	
2016	Corrina Bain	Debridement	Great Weather for Media	Finalist	
2016	Jackson Wright Schultz	Trans/Portraits: Voices from Transgender Communities	Dartmouth College Press	Finalist	
2016	Maggie Nelson	The Argonauts	Graywolf Press	Finalist	
2017	Vivek Shraya	Even This Page Is White	Arsenal Pulp Press	Winner	
2017	Jay Besemer	Chelate	Brooklyn Arts Press	Finalist	
2017	Ma-Nee Chacaby with Mary Louise Plummer	A Two-Spirit Journey: The Autobiography of a Lesbian Ojibwa-Cree Elder	University of Manitoba Press	Finalist	
2017	Qwo-Li Driskill	Asegi Stories: Cherokee Queer and Two-Spirit Memory	University of Arizona Press	Finalist	
2018	Reina Gossett, Eric A. Stanley, and Johanna Burton (ed.)	Trap Door: Trans Cultural Production and the Politics of Visibility	The MIT Press	Winner	
2018	Amir Rabiyah	Prayers for My 17th Chromosome	Sibling Rivalry Press	Finalist	
2018	Danez Smith	Don't Call Us Dead	Graywolf Press	Finalist	
2018	Kai Cheng Thom	A Place Called No Homeland	Arsenal Pulp Press	Finalist	
2019	Ely Shipley	Some Animal	Nightboat Books	Winner	
2019	Gwen Benaway	Holy Wild	Bookthug Press	Finalist	
2019	Jordy Rosenberg	Confessions of the Fox	One World/Random House	Finalist	
2019	Joy Ladin	The Soul of the Stranger	Brandeis University Press	Finalist	
2020	Kai Cheng Thom	I Hope We Choose Love	Arsenal Pulp Press	Winner	
2020	Arielle Twist	Disintegrate/Dissociate	Arsenal Pulp Press	Finalist	
2020	Ellis Martin and Zach Ozma (ed.)	We Both Laughed in Pleasure: The Selected Diaries of Lou Sullivan, 1961–1991	Nightboat Books	Finalist	
2020	Hazel Jane Plante	Little Blue Encyclopedia (for Vivian)	Metonymy Press	Finalist	
2021	Hil Malatino	Trans Care	University of Minnesota Press	Winner	
2021	Akwaeke Emezi	The Death of Vivek Oji	Riverhead	Finalist	
2021	Andrea Abi-Karam and Kay Gabriel (ed.)	We Want It All: An Anthology of Radical Trans Poetry	Nightboat Books	Finalist	
2021	S. Brook Corfman	My Daily Actions, or The Meteorites	Fordham University Press	Finalist	
2022	Ari Banias	A Symmetry	W. W. Norton	Winner	
2022	Casey Plett	A Dream of a Woman	Arsenal Pulp Press	Finalist	
2022	Torrey Peters	Detransition, Baby	One World	Finalist	
2022	Zoë Playdon	The Hidden Case of Ewan Forbes	Scribner	Finalist	
2023	Wo Chan	Togetherness	Nightboat Books	Winner	
2023	Cecilia Gentili	Faltas: Letters to Everyone in My Hometown Who Isn't My Rapist	LittlePuss Press	Finalist	
2023	imogen xtian smith	stemmy things	Nightboat Books	Finalist	
2023	Kemi Alabi	Against Heaven	Graywolf	Finalist	
2024	Emily Zhou	Girlfriends	LittlePuss Press	Winner	
2024	Oliver Radclyffe	Adult Human Male	Unbound Edition Press	Finalist	
2024	Casey Plett	On Community	Biblioasis	Finalist	
2024	Talia Bettcher, Marci Blackman, Claudia Sofia Garriga-Lopez, Cecilia Gentili, Kris Grey, Shereen Imayatulla, Nadine Rodriguez, Cassidy Scanlon, Catalina Schliebener Munoz, Red Washburn, Fitch Wilder, and Sarah Youngblood Gregory	Sinister Wisdom 128: Trans/Feminisms	Sinister Wisdom	Finalist	
2025	Charlie J. Stephens	A Wounded Deer Leaps Highest	Torrey House Press	Winner	
2025	Julian Carter	Dances of Time and Tenderness	Nightboat Books	Finalist	
2025	Samia Marshy and Eli Tareq El Bechelany-Lynch (eds.)	El Ghourabaa: A Queer and Trans Collection of Oddities	Metonymy Press	Finalist	
2025	Joshua Jennifer Espinoza	I Don't Want to be Understood	Alice James Books	Finalist	
2026	Jzl Jmz	Local Woman	Nightboat Books	Winner	
2026	Mirha-Soleil Ross (ed.)	Gendertrash from Hell	LittlePuss Press	Finalist	
2026	Tourmaline	Marsha: The Joy and Defiance of Marsha P. Johnson	Tiny Reparations Books	Finalist	
2026	dezireé a. brown	they/she/he: ritual to forget your (un)becoming	Host Publications	Finalist	
2026	Zefyr Lisowski	Uncanny Valley Girls	Harper Perennial	Finalist	

== See also ==
- Lambda Literary Award for Transgender Literature
- Otherwise Award
- Stonewall Book Award
