= Nevada (Binnie novel) =

2013 novel by Imogen Binnie

- First edition
- Author: Imogen Binnie
- Language: English
- Genre: Literary fiction, transgender literature
- Publisher: Topside Press
- Publication date: April 2, 2013; 13 years ago
- Publication place: United States
- Media type: Print (hardback & paperback)
- Pages: 262
- ISBN: 9780983242291

Nevada: A Novel is the debut novel from author Imogen Binnie, released by Topside Press in 2013. Nevada follows the story of Maria Griffiths, a trans woman living in Brooklyn, who embarks on a road trip headed towards the West Coast. Along the way, she meets James, a Walmart employee questioning his gender.

The novel was not an initial success, but gained an online following and was reissued in 2022. In the years following its release, it has been credited by literary critic Stephanie Burt as having started a transgender literary movement and inspiring other trans woman authors such as Torrey Peters and Casey Plett.

== Background ==
Binnie has said that in writing a story about a transgender protagonist, she wanted to resist the risk of explaining "The Trans Experience for cis people," which she says often happens with transgender memoirs. Because Nevada is a work of fiction, Binnie said she approached writing it as a transgender story written for trans women. "One of the questions I was trying to answer with Nevada was, what would a story about trans women that was intended for an audience of trans women — what would that look like?" Binnie told blogger Sarah McCarry in an interview about the book.

Binnie told W magazine that she was inspired by interactions she had in both online and offline transgender communities, saying:

Everybody who was like 'This is how to be trans' was doing it in a way that didn't resonate, so I wrote a book about somebody who was trying to tell somebody else how to be trans and it didn't resonate.

In an interview with Niko Stratis for Autostraddle, Binnie stated that while she shares similarities with the characters of Maria and James, Nevada was not meant to be autobiographical. Binnie remarked that two details about Maria—her red hair, and her enjoyment of Poison—were deliberately added to distinguish the character from herself.

Binnie felt enabled to write Nevada's narrative outside of the Western hero's journey format due to an essay by Joanna Russ: "What Can a Heroine Do? or Why Women Can’t Write". Binnie credits Dennis Cooper and Junot Díaz as other significant influences on Nevada. More broadly, her thinking on being trans is rooted in works by marginalized feminists, especially This Bridge Called My Back, edited by Cherríe Moraga and Gloria E. Anzaldúa; and writing by Audre Lorde and bell hooks.

== Publication history ==
Nevada was originally released by independent transgender literature focused publisher Topside Press in 2013. It was published under a Creative Commons license so that PDF copies could be distributed freely. In 2017, Nevada went out of print due to Topside Press disbanding. During this initial release it had sold about 10,000 copies. Fans of the novel continued to circulate copies of the novel and created a website where digital copies could be downloaded.

In June 2021, it was announced that Nevada would be reissued in the fall of 2022 by MCD Books' FSG Originals due to its enduring popularity. Later that summer, Binnie retweeted that the book would be published in June 2022 by Picador, making it available in the UK for the first time. On August 24, 2023, French publisher Gallimard published a French language translation of Nevada.

== Plot ==
Maria Griffiths lives in an apartment in Williamsburg, Brooklyn with her girlfriend, cisgender lesbian Steph. She has been working at the same bookstore in Manhattan for the past six years, during which she came out as a transgender woman. On a Sunday in October, over brunch, Steph confesses to Maria that she cheated on her with a mutual friend, a transgender man named Kieran. Maria processes the events of that day over the course of the week, ultimately deciding to break up with Steph. As she goes to work on the day of her decision, Maria sees Kieran; he admits that he and Steph never actually had sex, and the two made up the story to goad Maria into discussing her feelings with Steph. Steph ultimately breaks up with Maria before Maria has the chance to break up with her.

Immediately after the breakup, Maria visits the apartment of her close friend Piranha, another trans woman whom she had met on the way to Camp Trans. While there, she discovers that Piranha has been using heroin, partly as a way of coping with her chronic pain, as well as her pain being a likely contraindication for getting bottom surgery. The following day at work, Maria is fired for repeatedly showing up late, as well as taking breaks without her manager's permission. Following a difficult conversation with Piranha about their friendship, Maria visits a bar, where she makes the decision to drive as far away as possible from New York. After seeing Piranha for the last time, Maria buys heroin using the money she had been saving for her bottom surgery, and begins heading west in Steph's car.

One month later, in Star City, Nevada, James Hanson works at the local Walmart. James has been questioning his gender, and uses marijuana to avoid thinking about both his gender identity and how it would affect his relationship with his girlfriend, Nicole. Maria arrives at the store James works at, and immediately realizes that he is likely transgender. After purchasing a Miranda Lambert CD, Maria asks James if he would like to spend time with her. The two smoke marijuana in Steph's car (which has now been reported stolen) outside of James' apartment, where Maria stays for the night. The following day, James asks Maria if she is transgender, which prompts Maria to ask James whether or not he is trans as well. Over breakfast, the two decide to go to Reno for the day.

On the car ride to Reno, James brings up the concept of autogynephilia to Maria. Maria dissects the concept for James, and criticizes the work of J. Michael Bailey for promoting it. The two arrive at a restaurant, where they make plans to visit a casino. While at the restaurant, Maria gives further criticism of Kenneth Zucker, and recalls calling into a show on NPR to excoriate him on air, but getting too nervous to say anything. After arriving at the casino, James steals Maria's heroin while she's in the bathroom. Maria abandons James at the casino. The book ends with Nicole giving James a ride home; the fates of the main characters are left unclear.

Maria frequently lapses into long inner monologues throughout the book, reflecting on gender, heteronormativity, and social conditioning, as well as referencing other queer women authors by name, including Michelle Tea and Julia Serano.

== Analysis and themes ==
Noah Berlatsky, writing for the Los Angeles Times, wrote that the book challenges traditional linear narratives about gender transition and life in general, writing "it’s a road-trip novel that refuses to go anywhere, in which people aren’t locked into linear narratives."

Lily Meyer has pointed to themes of class in Nevada, writing that "...Nevada is as much about class and labor as it is about transness and gender." Maria's occupation as a bookseller is described as a dead end job that contributes to her feeling of being "stuck". In addition, it explores the intersection of class and gender. Maria is unable to afford gender affirming care such as electrolysis due to her low wage. Writing in GLQ, Rachel O'Connell argues that the novel depicts how economic struggles can affect transition, and how being transgender can create economic precarity. She additionally states that Maria and James represent two different generational responses to this precarity. Maria represents a Millennial response, by hyperactively taking extreme risks in a modern neo-bohemian environment. James represents a Generation X response, by disassociating from the world and adopting an apathetic affect. In creating this structure, the novel depicts how capitalism has affected trans lives through history.

== Reception and legacy ==
Nevada garnered little attention in the literary world upon its release. It received a negative review from the magazine Publishers Weekly. After its reissue, it gained several positive reviews, with Kirkus Reviews calling it "a funny, free-wheeling novel", and Library Journal stating it was "wry, hilarious, and smart".

Despite a small audience, Nevada soon gained a cult following among fans, who frequently shared copies with each other. Nevada was a finalist for the 2014 Lambda Literary Award for Transgender Fiction.

In 2022, transgender academic Stephanie Burt credited Nevada as having "changed the landscape of trans fiction—in part because it made no concessions to tourists," and argued that the book had become central to "the invention of the trans novel" in the 2010s.

Nevada was listed as one of The Atlantic's "Great American Novels" in 2024. Writing for the novel's inclusion on the list, critic Lily Meyer called Maria "a great character" and said that getting to know her through the text of the book "is worth doing again and again".

=== Influence ===
Nevada inspired other trans women writers, such as author Casey Plett, who said the book was "very bleak and it ends in a tough way," but ultimately made her feel that "nothing was off-limits" to write about. Torrey Peters, another trans woman and later the author of Detransition, Baby, cited it as a major inspiration of hers, writing that the book "shaped both my worldview and personhood, making me who I am".

Emily St. James credits Nevada, along with Hazel Jane Plante's Little Blue Encyclopedia (for Vivian), as the two key influences on her novel Woodworking.

== Adaptation ==
On January 17, 2023, director Jane Schoenbrun announced a casting call on their Twitter account seeking actors for a film adaptation of Nevada. Binnie endorsed the call with a retweet. However, in May 2024, it was announced that Schoenbrun had left the project due to "creative differences with cis people". As of 2025, there was no further public sign that the adaptation would move forward.
