= Trish Salah =

Canadian writer

- Born: Halifax, Nova Scotia, Canada
- Citizenship: Canadian
- Education: Concordia University (B.A., M.A.); York University (Ph.D.)
- Occupations: Poet; Activist; Academic
- Employer: Queen's University
- Notable work: Wanting in Arabic (2002; 2013); Lyric Sexology Vol. 1 (2014; 2017)
- Awards: Lambda Literary Award for Transgender Fiction (2014)

Trish Salah is an Arab Canadian poet, activist, and academic. She is the author of the poetry collections Wanting in Arabic (TSAR Publications, 2002) and Lyric Sexology Vol. 1 (Roof Books, 2014). An expanded Canadian edition of Lyric Sexology Vol. 1 was published by Metonymy Press in 2017.

== Biography ==
Salah was born and raised in Halifax, Nova Scotia, and is of Lebanese and Irish Canadian heritage. She received her B.A. and M.A. in English and Creative Writing from Concordia University in Montreal, Quebec, and her Ph.D. in English Literature at York University in Toronto, Ontario. Salah studied creative writing in Montreal during the late 1980s and early 1990s and had her first publications in little magazines and chapbooks, such as The Moosehead Anthology and Tessera. Loosely affiliated with ga press, she was a member of the performance poetry troupe, Ouma Seeks Ouzo and an editor and publisher at index magazine. Salah was active in the Montreal small press and spoken word scene until relocating to Toronto in 1996, where she became involved in Mirha-Soleil Ross's transsexual and transgender arts festival, Counting Past 2. While a PhD student and teaching assistant at York, Salah was politically active in the Canadian Union of Public Employees as the first transsexual representative to their National Pink Triangle Committee. She is currently associate professor in the Department of Gender Studies at Queen's University, and prior to her appointment at Queen's, was faculty in Women's and Gender Studies at the University of Winnipeg.

Her creative and scholarly work addresses transgender and transsexual politics and experience, diasporic Arab identity and culture, anti-racism, queer politics and economic and social justice. Her poetry combines lyric and experimental forms. She is urrently an assistant professor of Gender Studies at Queen’s University.

The 2013 reissue of Wanting in Arabic won the Lambda Literary Award for Transgender Fiction at the 26th Lambda Literary Awards in 2014. In 2018, she was named a finalist for the Dayne Ogilvie Prize for Canadian LGBTQ writers.

== Selected works ==
=== Books ===
Lyric Sexology, Vol. I. New York: Roof Books, 2014. (Second edition: Montreal, Metonymy Press, 2017.)

Wanting In Arabic: Poems. Toronto: Tsar Publications, 2002. (Second edition: Toronto, Mawenzi House, 2013.)

=== Edited volumes ===
Arc Poetry Magazine, "Polymorphous per Verse: Special Issue on Trans, Two Spirit and Non-Binary Writers." Co-edited with Ali Blythe. 94 (Winter 2021).

TSQ: Transgender Studies Quarterly. "Special Issue on Trans Cultural Production." Co-edited with Julian B. Carter and David J. Getsy. 1.4 (2014).

Canadian Review of American Studies. "Special Issue on Anne Marie MacDonald's Fall on Your Knees." Co-edited with Sara Matthews and Dina Georgis. 35.2 (2005).

=== Journal articles ===
"What Does Tiresias Want?" TSQ: Transgender Studies Quarterly. "Psychoanalysis and Trans Studies." 4.4 (Fall 2017): 632–638.

"'Time Isn't After Us': Some Tiresian Durations." Special Issue on Trans Temporalities. Somatechnics 7.1 (March 2017): 16-33.

"Backlash to the Future: Re/Inscribing Transsexuality as Fundamentalism." Topia: Canadian Journal of Cultural Studies, 25 (Spring 2011): 212–222.

"In Lieu of a Transgender Poetics." Contemporary Feminist Poetics in Canada. Ed. Kate Eichorn and Barbara Godard. Spec. Issue of Open Letter. 13.9 (Summer 2009): 34–6.

"After Cissexual Poetry." Contemporary Queer Poetics. Ed. Julian Brolaski. Spec. Issue of Aufgabe: Journal of Poetry. 8 (Summer 2009): 282–298.

=== Book chapters ===
"Returning to Schreber: Trans Literature as Psychoanalysis." Current Critical Debates in the Field of Transsexual Studies. Oren Gozlan, ed. New York: Routledge, 2018: 169–180.

"It Can Grow!!!" Meanwhile, Elsewhere: Science Fiction and Fantasy from Transgender Writers. Cat Fitzpatrick and Casey Plett, eds. New York: Topside Press, 2017: 67–78.

"Reflections on Trans Organizing, Trade Unionism and Radical Communities." Trans Activism in Canada: A Reader. Dan Irving and Rupert Raj, eds. Toronto: Canadian Scholar's Press, 2014: 149–167.

"From Fans to Activists: Popular Feminism enlists in 'The War on Terror'." Muslim Women, Transnational Feminism and the Ethics of Pedagogy: Contested Imaginaries in post-9/11 Cultural Practice. Lisa Taylor and Jasmin Zine, eds. Routledge, 2014: 152–71.

"Working for Change: Sex Workers in the Union Struggle." with J. Clamen and K. Gillies. Selling Sex: Canadian Academics, Advocates and Sex Workers in Dialogue. Emily van der Meulen, Elya M. Durisin, and Victoria Love eds. Vancouver: University of British Columbia Press, 2013: 113–129.

"Notes Towards Thinking Transsexual Institutional Poetics." Trans/acting Culture, Writing and Memory: Essays in Honour of Barbara Godard. Eva C. Karpinski, Jennifer Henderson, Ian Sowton, and Ray Ellenwood, eds. Waterloo: Wilfrid Laurier Press: 2013: 167–189.

"An-Identity Poetics and Feminist Artist-Run Centers/La poétique de l'anidentité et les centres d'artistes féministes autogérés." Féminismes électriques. Leila Pourtavaf, ed. Montreal: Les Éditions du remue-ménage/ La Centrale Gallerie Powerhouse, 2012: 81–106.
