= Girlfriends (short story collection) =

2023 book by Emily Zhou

- Author: Emily Zhou
- Language: English
- Genre: Coming-of-age stories, Transgender literature, Short stories
- Publisher: LittlePuss Press
- Publication date: October 17, 2023
- Publication place: United States
- Media type: Print
- ISBN: 9781736716847

Girlfriends is the 2023 debut story collection by the American writer Emily Zhou, published by LittlePuss Press. It contains seven short stories centering on coming-of-age moments for queer Gen Z women in New York City and Ann Arbor, Michigan.

== Plot ==
=== "Performance" ===
Lara is a 21-year-old graduate student working on a thesis about Henry James. She compartmentalizes while performing sex work, dealing with the advances of a friend's boyfriend, and starting a new romance.

=== "Affection" ===
Marina is a poet who drops out of graduate school. She gets a crush on the photographer of her nude photo shoot.

=== "Do-Over" ===
Kieran and her father struggle to connect as they remodel an inherited house into a bike store with the help of her dad's trans old coworker.

=== "Means to an End" ===
Leonora lives with three lesbian roommates who are constantly fighting and stuck in a love triangle. She has dropped out of NYU and attempts to plan her new path as she deals with conflict in the small apartment.

=== "Ponytail" ===
Veronica visits her ex-boyfriend and chats with other trans women at a party.

=== "Separate Ways" ===
A partner tries to end a one-sided relationship and break out of a rut in their life.

=== "Gap Year" ===
A college student recounts years of memories about their crush, Genevieve, a straight trans girl from the same school.

== Creation ==
Zhou was inspired to write fiction after reading works published by Topside Press, especially A Safe Girl to Love, by Casey Plett. Zhou began writing short stories after graduating from college, sharing them via a Substack newsletter. Edited versions of these stories, including one with a different ending, appear in Girlfriends.

All stories are set in Ann Arbor, Michigan, and New York City, both places Zhou has lived. She stated that her overarching goal "was to depict life in these places in a naturalistic but forgiving way, and show how young trans girls make their ways through social worlds that uncomfortably and incompletely accommodate us". Beyond Plett, Zhou stated that works by Mira Bellwether, Torrey Peters, hannah baer, and Mary McCarthy were influences on the development of Girlfriends.

== Publication ==
Stephen Ira suggested that Zhou share her Substack short stories with the new LittlePuss Press, which agreed to publish her collection. Casey Plett became the editor of what would become Girlfriends. Throughout the two years between acceptance and publication, Zhou added more stories and heavily edited the existing ones.

Girlfriends was published in 2023 by LittlePuss Press. It was Zhou's first published book.

== Reception ==
Kirkus Reviews praised Girlfriends' depiction of Gen Z queer coming-of-age stories and its nuanced take on the genre. Publishers Weekly described the stories as "animated depictions of youthful angst and queer desire", reviewing them as character studies which "are light on plot, but the women spring to life through dialogue, body postures, and personal style". Roz Milner, reviewing for the Toronto Star, praised Zhou's scene-crafting and characterization of youth who are learning to understand themselves.

Girlfriends won the 2024 Leslie Feinberg Award for Trans and Gender-Variant Literature. It was a finalist for the 2024 Lambda Literary Award for Transgender Fiction and the 2024 Ferro–Grumley Award for LGBTQ Fiction.
