= Ted Ngoy =

Cambodian American entrepreneur

- Born: Bun Tek Ngoy
- Occupations: Baker, entrepreneur, real estate agent
- Spouse: Christy Ngoy

Ted Ngoy (born Bun Tek Ngoy 倪文德; 1941) is a Cambodian American entrepreneur and former owner of a chain of doughnut shops in California. He is nicknamed the "Donut King".

== Biography ==
Ted Ngoy was born in the Cambodian village of Sisophon near the country's border with Thailand to a Chinese immigrant family. His father left him when he was 5 years old and was left to be raised alone by his single mother, who was from Shantou, Guangdong. Ngoy's mother did not speak Khmer, which meant they struggled to get by.

=== Early life in Cambodia ===
In 1967, Ngoy was sent by his mother to study in the capital, Phnom Penh, where he met and married Suganthini Khoeun, the daughter of a high-ranking government official. Ngoy worked at various jobs, including as a travel agent and tour guide, before joining the military in 1970. Through the maneuvering of his brother-in-law, chief of police and briefly future president of Cambodia, Sak Sutsakhan, Ngoy was promoted to the rank of major and appointed military attache at Cambodia's embassy in Thailand. In 1975, Ngoy fled the Khmer Rouge with his wife and three children and came via the U.S. Refugee Admissions Program to Camp Pendleton.

=== Donut King ===
Ngoy secured work as a janitor with Peace Lutheran Church in Tustin, California. While working a second job at a gas station, Ngoy took notice of a busy local doughnut shop and inquired of its operators about learning the business. He subsequently received training through an affirmative action program to increase minority hiring within the Winchell's chain of doughnut shops, and managed a store in Newport Beach where he employed his wife and nephew. By 1977 he was able to purchase his first doughnut shop, Christy's Donuts, in La Habra. Despite never really being a huge success under the previous owners, Christy's became popular under the ownership of the Ngoys. The Ngoys decided to keep uniformity amongst their shops, naming subsequent acquisitions Christy's.

Ngoy bought additional doughnut shops in Orange County. In 1979, Ngoy owned over 25 doughnut shops. He became tired running doughnut shops on his own and decided to train and lease shops to his relatives and employ Cambodian refugees. Ngoy stated, “I sponsored more than 100 families” and claimed to be related to each member on official government documents. He saw an opportunity to expand his business and help the large number of poor, unassimilated Cambodians who had fled the Khmer Rouge and came through the U.S. Refugee Admissions Program to the United States. By 1987, Ngoy owned 32 Christy's Donuts locations, largely accomplished by living out of a motor home allowing him and his family to travel up and down the state of California establishing new locations.

Ngoy's fortunes improved dramatically, such that by the mid-1980s Ngoy had amassed millions of dollars through his expanding doughnut shop empire. Ngoy claimed, ”I think I have 65 shops”, as a result of expansion primarily fueled by him and his wife's leasing program. In 1985, Ngoy and his wife became American citizens assuming the American names of Ted and Christy, respectively, and were enjoying a lavish lifestyle including a million dollar home at Lake Mission Viejo, a vacation home in Big Bear, expensive cars, and vacations to Europe. Ngoy had become an example to other Cambodian immigrants, who began to follow his business model for their own entrepreneurial endeavors. Ngoy also involved himself in American politics, joining the Republican Party and hosting fundraisers for George H. W. Bush and encouraged fellow Cambodian immigrants to support the GOP.

=== Decline ===
Despite the wealth he had amassed and his importance within his community, Ngoy felt dissatisfied, remarking that he had "No political life, no religious life, just work, work." In 1977, the Ngoys took a trip to Las Vegas where Ted saw Elvis Presley. It was here that Ngoy had his first taste of gambling while placing bets at the blackjack tables. Ngoy would make a habit of returning monthly to watch performers such as Tom Jones, Diana Ross, and Wayne Newton and indulging in the incentives pit bosses of major casinos offered all the while spending even larger sums at the card tables. This caused tension in the Ngoy household, being the center of many arguments between Ngoy and his wife. Ngoy would often visit Las Vegas for a period of a week, unbeknownst to his wife. He would forge her signature on checks and even borrow money from relatives who leased stores from him. When he was unable to pay back his debt, he would sign over his store to them. Once a paragon in the community, refugees now avoided him for fear of being asked for a loan. Ngoy attempted Gamblers Anonymous, but denied it helped with his situation, stating that when he went to meetings "I cry, everybody cry. After cry, go back gambling." Ngoy's gambling had progressed from the card tables to placing bets on sports games with Cambodian bookies.

That's why I want to tell the world, "Do not gamble." When you hook up with gambling, your life's finished. You will end up destroying the whole family and no more relationship with the world, just finished. Gambling is a devil.

After a particularly devastating gambling loss in 1990, Ngoy flew to Washington, D.C. and joined a Buddhist monastery where he spent a month meditating. Following his time in the nation's capital, Ngoy spent time in a monastery in the Thai countryside where he spent his morning begging for alms. Upon his return to Orange County, Ngoy began gambling harder than ever stating "Monks cannot help me, Buddha cannot help me." In 2020, he said his Christian faith ultimately helped him abandon the habit.

=== Political career ===
After Cambodia's establishment of a constitutional monarchy, Ngoy and his wife returned to the country for the 1993 Cambodian general election. He formed the Free Development Republican Party, believing that he could show others the path to wealth and hoping that being a politician might stymy his gambling addiction. He did not fare well in either the 1993 or 1998 parliamentary elections, but his friend, Prime Minister Hun Sen, made him an advisor on commerce and agriculture.

When his wife visited California for the birthday of their grandchild in 1999, Ngoy began an affair with a young woman; Christy divorced him soon after and has not since returned to Cambodia. Ngoy's political career ended in 2002 after breaking with two powerful allies, the commerce minister and the head of the Cambodian Chamber of Commerce, Teng Bunma. He dissolved his party and accused the government of corruption. The next day, he flew back to Los Angeles leaving behind his new wife and their two children. By 2002, after a failed political career in Cambodia, Ngoy came back to the United States with less than $100. Ngoy visited multiple churches and found shelter at a fellow Parkcrest Christian Church parishioner's mobile home. In 2013, he was living in Phnom Penh working in real estate.

== Film ==
Ngoy is the subject of the 2020 documentary film The Donut King. Ngoy was hesitant to return to California for the film; he was estranged from his children and former friends. However, the film's director—Alice Gu—persuaded him to and, ultimately, he regarded his return as a 'healing experience,' and his ex-wife and children have forgiven him.

== Legacy ==
Author Ryka Aoki describes Ngoy as "legend in our Asian-American community" and inspiration for her award-winning novel Light From Uncommon Stars for both his "stealing books" process and the legacy of Cambodian-American doughnut shops in Southern California.
