= Star City, Nevada =

- Ghost town
- Location within Nevada Location within the United States
- Country: United States
- State: Nevada
- County: Pershing
- Founded: 1861
- Abandoned: 1870s
- Elevation: 5,981 ft (1,823 m)

Nevada Historical Marker
- Reference no.: 231

Star City was a silver-mining boom town in present-day Pershing County, Nevada. It was located in the Star Mining District. It is now a ghost town.

The site is marked as Nevada Historical Marker 231.

== History ==
Star City was established in 1861 when rich silver ore deposits were discovered in the area. During its height from 1864 to 1865 the town was home to 1,200 people. It also housed two hotels, three general stores, a Wells-Fargo office, a church and more than a dozen saloons. The Post Office was in operation from April 1862 to September 1868. The largest mine in the Star Mining District was the Sheba Mine, which produced about $5 million in silver by 1868. That same year the ore deposit began to run out. An 1868 account remarks on Star City: "So sudden was its decline that the daily mail, the express office and the telegraph office are all in operation yet, though the entire population consists of a single family."

By 1871, only 78 people remained in Star City. Today the only reminders of the town are crumbling foundations and rusted mill equipment.

A fictionalized version of Star City is used as the setting for the second half of the novel Nevada, by Imogen Binnie. The Star City of Nevada, in contrast to the real-world ghost town, is home to a Walmart where the character James works.

A map references Star City on an early Map of the Overland Railroad route for the Central Pacific Railroad as "Ostar City," between Humboldt and Humboldt Wells, Nevada by mistake.
