= Charlie J. Stephens =

American writer

- Born: Salem, Oregon, US
- Occupation: Novelist and short story writer
- Education: San Francisco State University (MA, 2009)
- Notable awards: Leslie Feinberg Award (2025)

Website
- charliejstephenswriting.com

Charlie J. Stephens is an American novelist and short story writer. They are the author of the novel A Wounded Deer Leaps Highest (2024) and the short story collection Annihilation for Beginners (2026).

Beyond writing, Stephens owns the Sea Wolf Books & Community Writing Center in Port Orford, Oregon, which they opened in April 203. They have held various jobs across the United States, including teaching English at a public high school for a decade.

Stephens was born and raised in Salem, Oregon. They received a Master of Arts in Equity and Social Justice Education from San Francisco State University in 2009.

Stephens is queer, non-binary, and mixed race.

== Writing ==
Stephens's debut novel, A Wounded Deer Leaps Highest, was published by Torrey House Press on April 2, 2024. The novel, which started as the short story "Willamette", is set in the 1980s and centers Smokey Washington, an eight-year-old child who lives with their mother in a small and impoverished Oregon town. Inside the home, Smokey's mother is loving yet distant, bringing in abusive boyfriends. Beyond the home, Smokey is bullied by children and adults for being biracial and queer. As an escape from violence inside and outside of the home, Smokey seeks refuge with the natural world.

A Wounded Deer Leaps Highest was well received by critics, including a starred review from Foreword Reviews, whose Luke Sutherland praised the "prose drenched with awe". Julia Kastner, writing for Shelf Awareness, called the novel "heart-wrenching", noting that "the tragedies that befall Smokey and their family and neighbors will disturb even jaded and strong-stomached readers, but notes of stark truth and tenderness filter through. A will to live pervades these pages from beginning to end." In 2024, the novel received a bronze medal for the Foreword Indies Award in LGBTQ+ Adult Fiction, and was longlists for the Center for Fiction First Novel Prize. The following year, it won the Leslie Feinberg Award for Trans and Gender-Variant Literature, and was a finalist for the Oregon Book Award for Fiction.

Stephens's debut short story collection, Annihilation for Beginners, was published with Buckman Publishing in March 2026. The collection includes 28 stories written across 5 sections: Coast, Valley, River, Forest, and Sky.

== Books ==
- A Wounded Deer Leaps Highest. Torrey House Press. 2024. ISBN 978-1-948-81498-0.
- Annihilation for Beginners. Buckman Publishing. 2026. ISBN 978-1-967-05806-8.
