= Gwen Benaway =

Canadian writer

- Born: 1987 (age 38–39)
- Citizenship: Canadian
- Occupation: Poet
- Writing career
- Language: English

Gwen Benaway is a Canadian poet and activist. As of October 2019, she was a PhD candidate in the Women & Gender Studies Institute at the Faculty of Arts & Science at the University of Toronto. Benaway has also written non-fiction for The Globe and Mail and Maclean's.

== Activism ==
Benaway has spoken publicly about the healthcare system and transphobia. Benaway has said, ″I guess I can't tell the difference between living and writing, the social and the political, the body and the voice, the binary and the limitlessness of my heart. I'm trans, and by that I mean I'm beyond what the world can contain."

Benaway was one of the most prominent activists against the Toronto Public Library's decision to allow the feminist writer Meghan Murphy and the Radical Feminists Unite group to hold a speaking event at the library in 2019. She protested against the event to express her objection to comments Murphy had made about transgender people and Murphy's opposition to the establishment of transgender rights legislation. In an interview, Benaway said she had been "kettled in the library" by the Toronto police during the protest.

Benaway has also advocated for Indigenous trans people. She says she has Anishinaabe and Métis descent, although her Indigenous identity has been questioned.

== Publications ==
Benaway's poetry reflects her experience as a transgender woman, and often speaks about the ongoing realities of colonial violence. Scholar of LGBT and Two-Spirit Indigenous literatures Lisa Tatonetti described Benaway's work as "aesthetically beautiful" and wrote of Benaway's Passage that "while an incredibly personal book from a self-described feminist confessional poet, Passage, in its lyric beauty, its bravery, and its testament to survival and rebirth, is a gift to readers as well." The peer assessment committee for the Governor General's Literary Awards described Holy Wild as "lyrical rhythmic and fierce. It was an extraordinary experience reading this burning, honest manifesto."

Benaway has published three poetry collections to date, with one further announced:

- Benaway, Giles (2013). Ceremonies for the Dead. Chippewas of Nawash First Nation: Kegedonce Press. ISBN 978-0-9868740-5-5.
- Benaway, Gwen (2016). Passage. Chippewas of Nawash First Nation: Kegedonce Press. ISBN 9781928120087.
- Benaway, Gwen (2018). Holy Wild. BookThug. ISBN 9781771664394.
- Benaway, Gwen (2020). day/break. Book*hug.

Benaway curated the following collection of short fiction:

- Benaway, Gwen (2019) Maiden, Mother, and Crone: Fantastical Trans Femmes ISBN 978-1-988715-21-6

Benaway's writing has been featured in the following collections:

- Love beyond body, space, and time: an Indigenous LGBT sci-fi anthology (2016) Winnipeg: Bedside Press ISBN 9780993997075
- NotYourPrincess: Voices of Native American women (2017) Toronto: Annick Press. ISBN 9781554519576
- Refuse: CanLit in ruins (2018) Toronto: Bookhug. ISBN 9781771664332

== Essays and articles ==
- "Finding refuge in trans sisterhood" Xtra, November 20, 2019.
- "A Body like a Home", HazLitt, May 30, 2019 (a long-form essay about her gender-confirmation surgery)
- "Repair", Guts Magazine, May 3, 2019
- "The real price of transphobia", (Opinion) Xtra, February 12, 2019.
- "Pussy", carte blanche, December 12, 2018 (essay on trans women's bodies and transmisogyny)
- "Being loved back with Boy Meets Girl", Xtra, November 16, 2018.
- "Decolonial Love Letters to Our Bodies", Tea & Bannock, April 28, 2018 (a collaboration with Anishinaabe artist Quill Christie-Peters).
- "trans girl in love", Room Magazine (a long form essay about sexual violence, abusive relationships, and being a trans girl in love)
- "Dreaming of home" (a short essay on losing her "virginity").
- "Ahkii: a Woman is a Sovereign Land", Transmotion 3, no. 1 (2017)
- "The power-and the violence-of being an Indigenous trans woman", Maclean's. June 21, 2017.
- "No Contact Rule", carte blanche, June 12, 2017, (an essay on Canadian literature).
- "What Junot Diaz Doesn't Say", Flare Magazine, April 23, 2013 (an essay on the price that women pay to further men's self development).

== Awards ==
In 2015, Benaway was the inaugural winner of the "Legislative Assembly of Ontario Speaker's Award for Young Authors" for Ceremonies for the Dead In 2016 she received the Honour of Distinction from the Dayne Ogilvie Prize for LGBTQ writers.

She won Prism International's Creative Non-Fiction contest in 2017 for her piece "Between a Rock and a Hard Place".

In 2019, Benaway won the Governor General's Literary Award for English poetry for Holy Wild. The collection of poems look at the intersection of Indigenous and transgender identities. The book was also shortlisted for the Lambda Literary Award for Transgender Poetry at the 31st Lambda Literary Award, the Trillium Book Award for Poetry, and the Publishing Triangle Award for Trans and Gender-Variant Literature.

In 2019, Benaway's essay "A Body Like a Home" won a gold medal in the 42nd National Magazine Awards in the Personal Journalism category.
