= Hil Malatino =

Writer and academic

- Awards: Leslie Feinberg Award (2022)

Academic background
- Education: Florida Atlantic University (BA, 2005); Binghamton University (MA, 2008; PhD, 2010)

Academic work
- Discipline: Women, Gender, and Sexuality Studies
- Institutions: Pennsylvania State University

Hil Malatino is a writer and academic in the field of women's, gender, and sexuality studies. As of 2026, he is an associate professor at Pennsylvania State University. His research explores gender expansive individuals' experiences of violence, trauma, and resilience.

== Early life education ==
Though Hil Malatino was assigned female at birth, he learned he is intersex when he was 15 years old. In his 30s, he began taking testosterone.

Malatino earned a Bachelor of Arts in English literature from Florida Atlantic University in 2005. He then attended Binghamton University, from which he earned a Master of Arts in philosophy in 2008, followed by a Doctor of Philosophy in philosophy and a graduate certificate in feminist theory in 2010. He later held a postdoctoral fellowship at Indiana University.

== Career ==
Malatino began his career as a lecturer in women's, gender, and sexuality studies at East Tennessee State University. As of 2026, he is an associate professor in Pennsylvania State University's Department of Women's, Gender, and Sexuality Studies. His research explores gender expansive individuals' experiences of violence, trauma, and resilience.

Malatino published his first book, Queer Embodiment: Monstrosity, Medical Violence, and Intersex Experience, with the University of Nebraska Press in 2019. The book explores what it means to be intersex, while drawing from critical intersex studies, transgender studies, and feminist theory.

Malatino's second book, Trans Care, was published by the University of Minnesota Press in 2020. Throughout the book, "Malatino illustrates how daily negative affect impacts queer, trans, and non-binary lives", while building toward what he calls "a t4t (trans for trans) praxis of love". Malatino's concept builds from Leah Lakshmi Piepzna-Samarasinha's "care webs". Though Piepzna-Samarasinha's work focuses on disability, Malatino explores how transgender people work together "to provide everyday economic and social support". Trans Care won the 2022 Publishing Triangle Award for Trans and Gender-Variant Literature, since renamed as the Leslie Feinberg Award.

Side Affects: On Being Trans and Feeling Bad, Malatino's third book, was published by the University of Minnesota Press in 2022. The book uses critical phenomenology to explore "fatigue, envy, burnout, numbness, and rage amid the ongoing onslaught of casual and structural transphobia".

Malatino's fourth book, Climbing, is scheduled to be published by Duke University Press in July 2026. The book "explores rock climbing as a metaphor for the experience of being trans".

== Publications ==
- Queer Embodiment: Monstrosity, Medical Violence, and Intersex Experience. University of Nebraska Press. 2019. ISBN 978-0-803-29593-3.
- Trans Care. University of Minnesota Press. 2020. ISBN 978-1-517-91118-8.
- Side Affects: On Being Trans and Feeling Bad. University of Minnesota Press. 2022. ISBN 978-1-452-96729-5.
- Climbing. Duke University Press. 2026. ISBN 978-1-478-03881-8.
