= Transgender literature =

Literary genre

Transgender literature is a collective term used to designate the literary production that addresses, has been written by or portrays people of diverse gender identity.

== History ==
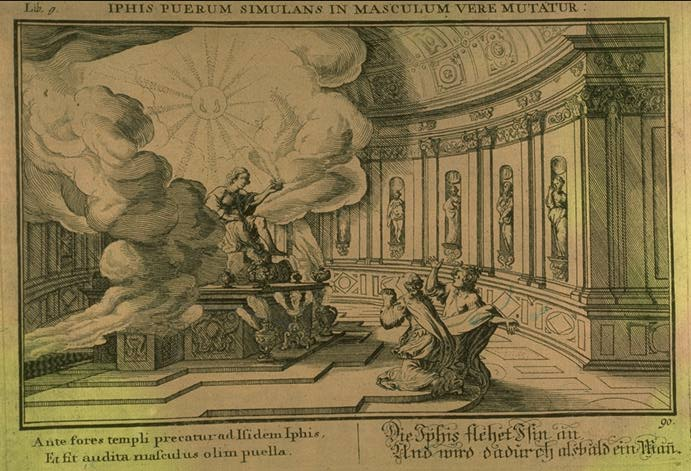
Isis changing the sex of Iphis. Engraving by Bauer for a 1703 edition of Metamorphoses.

Representations in literature of transgender people have existed for millennia, with Ovid's Metamorphoses (written in the year 8 CE) containing some of the earliest accounts.

The Routledge Handbook of Trans Literature, edited by Douglas A. Vakoch and Sabine Sharp, surveys core topics in transgender literary theory and criticism, such as performativity, visibility, temporality, and monstrosity, as well as diverse genres ranging from life writing and science fiction to comics and manga. The handbook includes overviews of trans literature from six periods: Medieval, Renaissance, Enlightenment, Romantic, Victorian, and Modernist.

Susan Stryker’s Transgender History: The Root’s of Today’s Revolution, revised edition published 2017, is a guide to the general history of American transgender culture. Both the original and revised editions are short books, but they provide a good overview of transgender history. Stryker covers topics from terminology to social movements. This book can be a good introduction to transgender culture and a guide for those unfamiliar with the LGBTQIA+ community and culture.

=== 20th century ===
In the twentieth century, it is notable that the novel Orlando (1928), by Virginia Woolf, is considered one of the first transgender novels in English and whose plot follows a bisexual poet who changes gender from male to female and lives for hundreds of years.

Before Orlando, The Marvelous Land of Oz by L. Frank Baum was published in 1904. Its main character, Ozma, was born female but turned into a boy named Tippetarius/Tip as an infant, and raised male until at the end of the book discovering their true identity as the princess of Oz.

Beyond Orlando, the twentieth century saw the appearance of other fiction works with transgender characters that saw commercial success. Among them is Myra Breckinridge (1968), a satirical novel written by Gore Vidal that follows a trans woman hellbent on world domination and bringing down patriarchy. The book sold more than two million copies after publication, but was panned by critics.

Trans literature was heavily marginalized and mostly shared underground during the 1900s. Red Jordan Arobateau self-published many forms of literature on trans subjects throughout the 1900s. Underground zines like gendertrash and TransSisters were sources of some trans fiction during the 1990s. In 1993, Leslie Feinberg published a seminal work in trans literature and culture, Stone Butch Blues.

==== Transgender memoirs ====
Many of the first publications that foregrounded transgender individuals and their experiences were memoirs. Perhaps the earliest example is Man into Woman (1933), by Lili Elbe. The older Autobiography Of an Androgyne (1918), by Victorian/Edwardian era activist Jennie June/Ralph Werther is also an important but often muddy insight into the lives of what he/she called "Ultra-Androgynes", a gender identity of which closest modern equivalent borders closely with transgender woman or effeminate-leaning non-binary.

For many decades, trans literature released by large mainstream publishers was very limited, and took the form of memoirs explaining a trans writer's life to an assumed cisgender audience. Critiques of these tropes evolved out of the new field of trans theory that developed during the 1990s. According to Kuchenga Shenjé, the shared structure and themes of these books were due to their political intentions. Commonly, the books focused on white trans women and followed a prescribed narrative: they were assigned male at birth, realized they were women, endured violence or discrimination before leaving for a big city, undertook medical transition, and thus finished their journey by "becoming woman". These tropes are further discussed by Jonathan Ames in Sexual Metamorphosis: An Anthology of Transsexual Memoirs.

Trans memoirs during the 1990s grew more diverse in their exploration of gender experiences than the model set by earlier memoirs like Jan Morris's Conundrum. Early acclaimed memoirs written by trans people include Gender Outlaw (1994), by Kate Bornstein; Man Enough to be a Woman (1996), by Jayne County; and Crossing: A A Memoir (1999), by Deirdre McCloskey.

=== 21st century ===
Transgender literature emerged as a distinct branch of LGBTQIA+ literature in the early twenty-first century, when the number of fiction works focused on trans experience saw a pronounced growth and diversification. This was accompanied by a greater academic and general interest in the area, as well as a process of differentiation from the rest of LGBTQIA+ literature. In recent decades, more books than ever have been written by transgender authors with an intended audience of transgender readers. Many academic writings on transgender topics are gathered in Transgender Studies, a set of volumes edited by Susan Stryker and Aren Aizura.

Critical and commercial success came to more memoirs in the 2000s, including the Lambda Literary Award winners She's Not There, by Jennifer Finney Boylan (2003); Becoming a Visible Man (2004) by Jamison Green, one of the first memoirs by a trans man to receive wide readership; and Dress Codes (2002), by Noelle Howey, about growing up with a trans parent.

Shenjé found that the trans memoir genre started to diversify, increasing the presence of Black trans narratives during the 2010s, such as Redefining Realness (2014), by Janet Mock. Still, many of these books had to be self-published. They include Dominique Jackson's The Transsexual from Tobago, Ts Madison's A Light Through The Shade: An Autobiography of a Queen and Hope Giselle's Becoming Hope: Removing the Disguise.

Other memoirs during this decade pushed against the narrative tropes of the trans memoir genre, in works like Juliet Jacques's Trans, Zoe Dolan's There is Room for You, and Thomas Page McBee's Amateur. Vivek Shraya examined how her relationship to men has changed over time in I'm Afraid of Men. In 2019 some of the first nonbinary memoirs were published, including Luna Ferguson's Me Myself, They: Life Beyond the Binary, T. Fleischmann's Time is the Thing a Body Moves Through and Jacob Tobia's Sissy: A Coming-of-Gender Story.

Publication of trans literature grew as small and indie presses enabled trans authors to traditionally publish authentic narratives. Self-published works also sustained the genre's growth. Like many other communities marginalized by their identities, trans writers had previously been excluded from most of the publishing industry. Tom Léger, Julie Blair, Riley Macleod, and Red Durkin founded Topside Press in 2011 to support trans publishing. Their press supported the careers of many new trans authors of the 2010s, pushed mainstream presses to support trans writers, and inspired further indie publishers of trans literature. They published Imogen Binnie's Nevada in 2013, which became a cult classic and breakthrough work of trans literature. Other writers associated with Topside included Ryka Aoki, Sybil Lamb, Casey Plett, and Kokumo.

During the late 2010s, more works of traditionally published trans literature could challenge and complicate literary ideas about trans people and writing. In 2015, Roz Kaveney published Tiny Pieces of Skull, a novel centering on a trans protagonist. Kaveney wrote the book in 1988 but could not get a publisher for years, even after other authors pushed for the book to be published. In 2016, Kai Cheng Thom subverted the tropes of the transgender memoir as a frame for her novel Fierce Femmes and Notorious Liars: A Dangerous Trans Girl's Confabulous Memoir. In 2017, C. Riley Snorton's Black on Both Sides was one of the first academic books to examine Black trans intersectionality. Tourmaline, Eric A. Stanley, and Johanna Burton published Trap Door the same year, an anthology sharing art, publications, and political materials produced by trans people. In 2018, Jordy Rosenberg published Confessions of the Fox with Random House, making it one of the first books written by an out trans author and published by a mainstream publisher. Also that year, Jules Gill-Peterson published Histories of the Transgender Child, an influential academic response to contemporary opinions about trans children.

Contemporary trans literature began receiving more critical notice and acclaim in the 2020s. In 2020, Dutch-born Lucas Rijneveld, who is non-binary, won the International Booker Prize with his novel The Discomfort of Evening. Torrey Peters' 2021 Detransition, Baby achieved immense popular and critical success. More trans writers and themes have since been published across a range of genres.

Still, intersectional trans literature is a slow-growing genre. Scholar Bethany Karsten found very few Black transfeminine novelists upon a survey of the field in 2024. Novels published in the 2020s included Shola von Reinhold's LOTE, Alexandrine Ogundimu's The Longest Summer, Kuchenga Shenjé's The Library Thief, and Denne Michele Norris's When the Harvest Comes. Kuchenga Shenjé praised the nuanced intersectional transmasculine narrative within the 2020 novel The Vanishing Half, by cisgender author Brit Bennett.

== In Spanish ==
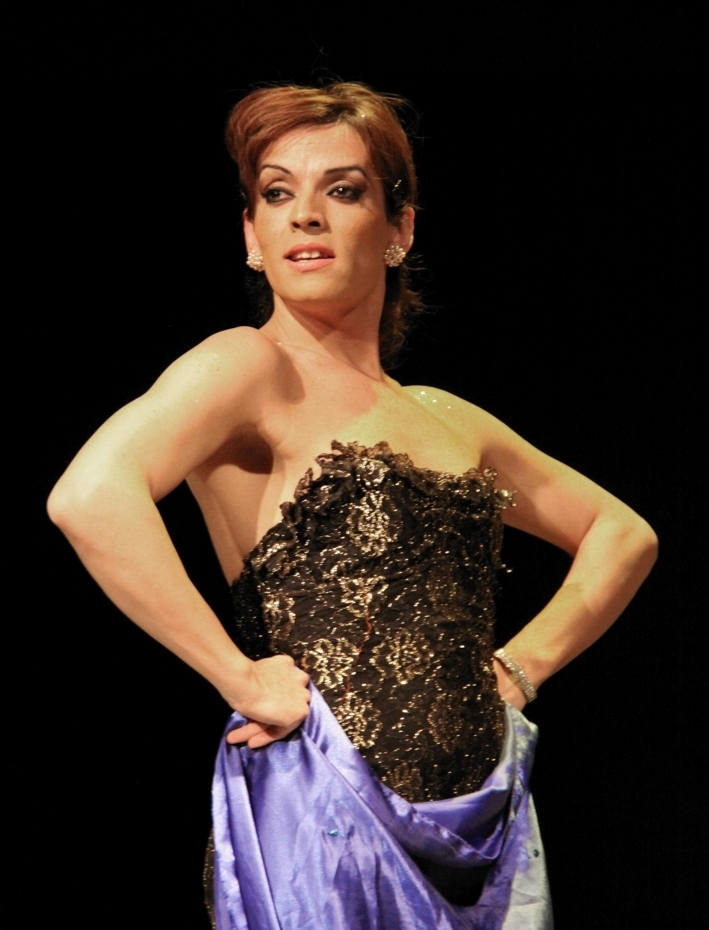
Camila Sosa Villada, author of Las malas (2019)

Among the best known works trans literature in Spanish language are: Hell Has No Limits, a novel by Chilean José Donoso published in 1966 whose protagonist is Manuela, a trans woman who lives with her daughter in a deteriorated town called El Olivo; Cobra (1972), by Cuban writer Severo Sarduy, that uses an experimental narration to tell the story of a transvestite who wants to transform her body; and Kiss of the Spider Woman (1976), a novel by Manuel Puig in which a young revolutionary called Valentín shares a cell with Molina, who is presented as a gay man but who during their conversations implies that his identity might be of a transgender woman, as its shown in the next passage:

– Are all homosexuals like that?
– No, there are others that fall in love among themselves. Me and my friends are women. We don't like those little games, those are things homosexuals do. We are normal women that have sex with men.

In recent years, many books in Spanish with transgender protagonists have garnered commercial and critical success. In Argentina, one of the most famous examples is Las malas (2019), by Camila Sosa Villada, which won the prestigious Sor Juana Inés de la Cruz Prize. The novel, inspired by the youth of the author where she narrates the lives of a group of transgender prostitutes working in the city of Córdoba, became a critical and commercial sensation, with more than eight editions in Argentina alone and translations to many languages in the first year of publication.

From recent Ecuadorian literature, one example is Gabriel(a) (2019), by Raúl Vallejo Corral, a novel that won the Miguel Donoso Pareja Prize with the story of a transgender woman that falls in love with an executive and faces a discriminatory society in her attempt to become a journalist.

== In children's literature ==
According to a 2015 NPR story, hundreds of books featuring transgender characters have been published since 2000. Although a vast majority of them tend to be targeted to a teenage audience, these publications also consist of picture books for younger children.

Transgender teenage girl Jazz Jennings co-authored a 2014 children's book called I Am Jazz about her experience discovering her identity. Scholastic Books published Alex Gino's Melissa in 2015, about a transgender girl, Melissa, who everyone else knows as George. Unable to find books with transgender characters to explain her father's transition to her children, Australian author Jess Walton created the 2016 children's book Introducing Teddy with illustrator Dougal MacPherson to assist children in understanding gender fluidity. Additional books listed by The Horn Book Magazine include:

- Melissa (2015) by Alex Gino
- Red: A Crayon's Story (2015) by Michael Hall
- The Other Boy (2016) by M. G. Hennessey
- Lily and Dunkin (2016) by Donna Gephart
- Alex as Well (2015) by Alyssa Brugman
- Jess, Chunk, and the Road Trip to Infinity (2016) by Kristin Elizabeth Clark
- Look Past (2016) by Eric Devine
- If I Was Your Girl (2016) by Meredith Russo
- Lizard Radio (2015) by Pat Schmatz
- Beast (2016) by Brie Spangler
- The Art of Being Normal (2016) by Lisa Williamson

In the past few years, transgender women have been finding publishers for their own picture books written for transgender kids. Some of these books include:

- A Princess of Great Daring (2015) written by Tobi Hill-Meyer, illustrated by Elenore Toczynski
- Super Power Baby Shower (2017) written by Tobi Hill-Meyer and Fay Onyx, illustrated by Janine Carrington
- He wants to be a princess (2019) written and illustrated by Nicky Brookes
- From the Stars in the Sky to the Fish in the Sea (2017) written by Kai Cheng Thom, illustrated by Kai Yun Ching & Wai-Yant Li
- The Girl from the Stars (2016) written and illustrated by Amy Heart
- The Sisters from the Stars (2018) written and illustrated by Amy Heart

== Publishing ==
During the late 1900s, media representations of trans people were largely created by cisgender screenwriters and medical practitioners. Trans authors were overwhelmingly excluded from the publishing industry, especially if their work involved trans topics and characters. Some mainstream presses occasionally sought works about trans people, but they only published narrow genres of writing. Instead, trans communities created their own underground cultural spaces.

Micropresses and anonymized publishing provided some of the first platforms for modern trans and gender-nonconforming literature. Virginia Prince's Chevalier Publications ran from 1960 to 1986, publishing influential U.S. works like the 1960 novel Fated for Femininity and the Transvestia magazine. Beginning in the 1980s, Sandy Thomas Advertising and Reluctant Press produced trans fiction, with the latter supporting authors like Roberta Angela Dee and Diane Woods. In the 1990s, self-published political zines became popular methods of distributing trans stories for trans communities. During this time, online platforms like Fictionmania, Crystal's Story Site, and BigCloset TopShelf became major venues for user-contributed trans fiction. BigCloset TopShelf launched DopplerPress in 2007 as a publishing arm for authors associated with the site, and its methods provided inspiration for many trans authors interested in self-publishing. Works published via DopplerPress include those by Katie Leone, Becoming Robin by Zoe Taylor, and The Reluctant Girlfriend by Melanie Brown.

Starting in the 1990s, small independent publishers helped publish trans literature for broader audiences. This established North American small presses as the publishing center of trans literature for decades. Firebrand Books was founded by Nancy K. Bereano in 1985 as an independent lesbian, feminist press. During the 1990s, they published works by well-known transgender activists like Leslie Feinberg and Riki Wilchins, with the 1993 Stone Butch Blues and 1997 Read My Lips.

=== 2000s ===
Arsenal Pulp Press established a LGBTQ publishing program in 1993, and produced explicitly trans and non-binary literature beginning in the 2000s with Ivan Coyote and S. Bear Bergman's work. In 2005, Arpita Das's Yoda Press began a Sexualities Series, which soon covered academic and trade books on queer subjects. Some of their first influential works on trans topics included Because I Have a Voice edited by Gautam Bhan and Arvind Narrain and Our Lives, Our Words by A. Revathi. Cleis Press, a queer feminist press, began publishing trans literature with works like The Transgender Child, Take Me There edited by Tristan Taormino, and Transitions of the Heart edited by Rachel Pepper. Manic D and Seal Press also published trans literature, along with academic presses like Routledge, Duke University, and Haworth Press.

=== 2010s ===
Queer and feminist presses in the 2010s also dedicated more space to trans titles. Egales, Mili Hernández's press dedicated to LGBT literature, began producing trans books in 2010. Urvashi Butalia's Zubaan Books, focused on queer and feminist writing, added early contributions to Indian trans literature including A Life in Trans Activism by A. Revathi and Nandini Murali, and No Outlaws in the Gender Galaxy edited by Chayanika Shah, Raj Merchant, Shals Mahajan and Smriti Nevatia. In 2014, Metonymy Press was founded in Montreal by Ashley Fortier and Oliver Pickle as a response to limited Montreal-created queer publishing in English. Dos Bigotes, founded in 2014 by Alberto Rodríguez and Gonzalo Izquierdo, published LGBTQ anthologies and titles focusing on trans topics.

Trans-led presses and indie publishers primarily dedicated to trans literature also formed during the 2010s. These included Trans-Genre Press with Ryka Aoki's Seasonal Velocities and biyuti publishing with Luna Merbruja's Trauma Queen. Instar Books produced works like Jeanne Thornton's The Black Emerald, growing to become one of the most notable indie publishers of trans writing. gaita nihil created puntos suspensivos ediciones (ellipsis press) in Argentina in 2015, focusing on trans poetry, travesti writing, and essays by trans people.

Topside Press became a very influential trans-led small press dedicated to publishing trans literature. It was founded in 2012 in New York where it published key works of modern trans literature and helped create a trans literary scene. Imogen Binnie's Nevada became their most popular book, but they also supported trans authors like Sybil Lamb, Ryka Aoki, Casey Plett, and Cat Fitzpatrick. However, Topside received criticism for not supporting trans authors of color. Jamie Berrout's Incomplete Short Stories and Essays provided particularly influential critiques of racism and tokenization within Topside's work. Topside disbanded in 2017.

Jamie Berrout decided to create a writers collective to fund trans women writers and distribute their work, seeing this as a better alternative for marginalized writers and readers than the traditional publishing industry with its systemic problems. Berrout's Trans Women Writers Collective produced booklets in Philadelphia from 2018 to 2020. The River Furnace collective inherited the project. Berrout's critiques had a large impact on the publishing sphere for trans literature, and especially the literary world's support of trans writers of color.

=== 2020s ===
In the 2020s, mainstream presses began to publish more works of trans literature by trans authors. This decade, indie presses, many trans-led, feminist-oriented, or focused on queer literature, continue to publish new types of trans literature. Cipher Press was founded in 2020 as a response to limited queer publishing from the UK. LittlePuss Press began in 2021 as a feminist press run by trans women, dedicated to publishing trans and marginalized authors. Other independent presses committed to trans publishing include Graywolf Press, Feminist Press, Nightboat, Kensington Publishing, Bold Strokes Books, Queen of Swords Press, Android Press, and Speaking Tiger Books.

=== Awards ===
Awards for trans literature include the Lambda Literary Award for Transgender Fiction, Nonfiction, and Poetry and the Leslie Feinberg Award for Trans and Gender-Variant Literature. Trans literature is also covered by awards for LGBTQ literature. Related awards include those centering on gender, including the Otherwise Award and the Sense of Gender Awards.

== See also ==
- List of transgender publications
- Gay literature
- Lesbian literature
- Trans poetry
