= Emily Zhou =

American author (born 2000)

- Born: October 1997 (age 29)
- Occupation: Author, Editor
- Years active: 2023–present
- Website: emilyzhou.neocities.org

Emily Zhou (born October 1997) is an American author known for her short story collection Girlfriends.

== Early life and education ==
Zhou is from Michigan. After she graduated from the University of Michigan she moved to New York City.

== Career ==
In 2023, Zhou released Girlfriends (short story collection), a collection of short stories about Gen Z queer life. Girlfriends was published by LittlePuss Press, where Zhou also works as an editrix. She was a finalist for the 2023 Lambda Literary Award in Transgender Fiction and won the 2023 Publishing Triangle's Leslie Feinberg Award. She has also published work in the journal e-flux.

== Personal life ==
Zhou is Transgender.
