= LittlePuss Press =

American independent publishing company

- Founded: 2020
- Founder: Casey Plett, Cat Fitzpatrick
- Headquarters location: Brooklyn, New York
- Publication types: Books
- Fiction genres: Feminist literature, Transgender literature

LittlePuss Press is a small press from Brooklyn, New York, founded by Cat Fitzpatrick and Casey Plett. LittlePuss is a feminist press run by trans women. Their books have won awards including the Stonewall Book Award and Leslie Feinberg Award.

== Background ==
Topside Press published Casey Plett and Cat Fitzpatrick's speculative fiction anthology Meanwhile, Elsewhere in 2017. After Topside Press disbanded, Plett and Fitzpatrick co-founded LittlePuss Press to continue printing the anthology. Fitzpatrick had some previous publishing experience, beginning with her production of Sybil Lamb's I've Got a Time Bomb, when they turned Lamb's zines into a book.

LittlePuss Press launched in 2020. The name "LittlePuss" is a portmanteau of Plett's Little Fish and Fitzpatrick's Glamourpuss works.

Plett and Fitzpatrick describe LittlePuss Press as "a feminist press run by two trans women", focusing on publishing works by authors that might struggle to get a publisher due to background, lack of prior publications, or unfinished manuscripts. They hope to support authors that have not even connected with other indie publishers, and want to publish books they help create with "eminent geniuses kind of just wandering around town". Another motivation was to make space "for trans writing that was off-kilter, really unique, really creative, and not necessarily commercial." They focus on publishing works by queer and trans authors, although they welcome submissions from anyone. One of their initiatives is The Trans Reprint Project, aiming to republish historical trans literature that is not currently available.

LittlePuss takes inspiration from the collaborations between earlier lesbian presses and bookstores, who created their own networks of distribution for marginalized works. Some of LittlePuss's feminist press inspirations include Firebrand Books, Naiad Press, and Kitchen Table: Women of Color Press. Plett said that Jeanne Thornton was a key mentor for helping her enter the publishing industry. Plett and Fitzpatrick are more involved with author writing than is standard for the publishing industry, and they publicize books via word-of-mouth like many other small presses.

Originally, LittlePuss Press works were edited by either Fitzpatrick or Plett. Other duties were divided so Fitzpatrick handled publicity-oriented work while Plett handled financial concerns. Both founders contributed personal funds to begin the press. From its first book, LittlePuss partnered with Small Press Distribution (SPD) to send its publications to bookstores, like many other indie publishers. However, SPD abruptly shut down in 2024, taking $12,000 in sales owed to LittlePuss. Plett said it was an unexpected blow but that LittlePuss adjusted with the help of personal networks who connected them to other distributors like Ingram, which became LittlePuss's new distributor. In 2025, LittlePuss was one of 35 of SPD's former presses to receive an award from the Community of Literary Magazines and Presses, earning $15,000 and a one-year membership.

As of January 2026, Emily Zhou, who previously published her debut work with LittlePuss, was an editor for the press alongside Fitzpatrick, while Plett worked as a publisher.

== Reception ==
Meg Reid of Hub City Press cited Plett and LittlePuss as an inspiration, in their care for authors and determination to fix holes they see in literary culture. S. Bear Bergman described the press's creation as a "deeply optimistic choice", naming Plett and Fitzpatrick "smartypantses" in a positive review for one of their first works. Luke Sutherland and Andrea Morgan were inspired by LittlePuss's influence on the Brooklyn trans literature community and decided to create Lilac Peril to emulate their work in Washington, D.C. Sutherland said Plett, Fitzpatrick, and Zhou "have built a culture where joy is the norm".

The New York Times profiled LittlePuss Press in 2022, but some criticized the paper for including a text box inside the profile "with links to fearmongering articles", and the textbox was later removed. Kay Gabriel described the contrast as "an extraordinary snapshot of the different aims of very mainstream liberal journalism right now", between "occasionally buttressing trans cultural creation" and repeating claims that aim to "limit access to trans medicine, as if the threats to trans safety were somehow separate from the concerted attempt to limit, or block entirely, access to transition care." Plett responded that she "hate[d] that some higher-up at the NYT put that infobox in there, and [she was] also not terribly surprised." She was pessimistic about institutions like this improving in their treatment of trans people, and wanted LittlePuss to be part of an independent institutional ecosystem to support trans writing.

== Works ==
The first publication by LittlePuss Press was a reissue of Meanwhile, Elsewhere. Plett said this was a helpful work to start the press with because it already had been edited and formatted. The original work's publication under a Creative Commons license also helped. LittlePuss began with a trial 1,000-copy print run for Meanwhile, Elsewhere, selling out in a year.

Their second publication was Faltas, by Cecilia Gentili. It was the recipient of the 2023 Stonewall Award in the nonfiction category. Fitzpatrick had wanted to publish Gentili's memoir for years after hearing some of Gentili's stories at New York literary events. Faltas is an epistolary memoir, in the form of eight letters to people from her youth in Gálvez, Argentina. Hugh Ryan, reviewing for the Los Angeles Review of Books, said it "strikes a rare balance: at once agonizing and hilarious, angry and forgiving, beautiful and unbearable. In other words, it is an almost perfect reflection of the fullness of a life marked by triumph".

=== 2023 ===
In 2023, they published Girlfriends, by Emily Zhou. Plett was the book's editor. Girlfriends won the 2024 Leslie Feinberg Award for Trans and Gender-Variant Literature. It was a finalist for the 2024 Lambda Literary Award for Transgender Fiction and the 2024 Ferro–Grumley Award for LGBTQ Fiction. S. Bear Bergman, reviewing for Xtra, said the work was "great", with stories that were "finely observed and funny and, in a way I find a bit difficult to describe, so very queer."

=== 2024 ===
In 2024, LittlePuss published Log Off: Why Posting and Politics (Almost) Never Mix, by Katherine Cross. The work debates the pros and cons of social media, investigating why social movements for marginalized groups often fail to sustain themselves on social media due to the platforms's choices to support intra-community violence in the hunt for increased platform engagement. Roz Milner, writing for Full Stop, said "Cross’s insights and experience as both a scholar and a poster make Log Off a book that’s fascinating reading and bound to stir up arguments."

=== 2025 ===
In 2025, LittlePuss published two debut works: Vivian Blaxell's Worthy of the Event: An Essay, and Anton Solomonik's Realistic Fiction. Both books received positive reviews. Erin Vachon, reviewing for The Rumpus, said "reading both LittlePuss books back-to-back is like attending a celebration with two different but equally sharp jokesters. Blaxell unspools a devastating meditation on life, sideswiping you with rapid-fire jokes. Solomonik spins fictions that feel like jokes before you realize you are devastated by them."

==== Worthy of the Event: An Essay ====
Worthy of the Event is a book with seven sections on subjects like disappointment, becoming, beauty, disaster, and infinity. Publishers Weekly, in a starred review, said: "teeming with wonder and wicked humor, Blaxell’s dispatches offer a boisterous trip through a formidable intellect". Agnes Borinsky, for the Los Angeles Review of Books, writes that Blaxell's "prose makes me want to get up out of bed and dance with it", with the book asking "What if transness—and by extension, trans writing—is better understood as nothing more or less than an experience of beauty?" Worthy of the Event is a finalist for the 2026 Judy Grahn Award for Lesbian Nonfiction.

==== Realistic Fiction ====
Realistic Fiction is a set of eleven short stories. Publishers Weekly described Realistic Fiction as a provocative work exploring trans identity with "philosophical musings and highbrow wit", good for "fans of weird and punchy short fiction". Sam Karagulin, writing for Full Stop, said that Solomonik's "essential contribution to [the] robust and growing tradition [of trans literature] lies in his humorous skewering of trans masculine loneliness and privilege". Willow Campbell, for the Cleveland Review of Books, said Solomonik's "refreshingly self-aware, dark, maniacal prose allows these stories to resonate. Solomonik’s characters are at once trapped by the form of fiction and freed by it."

==== Gendertrash from Hell ====
Also in 2025, LittlePuss published Gendertrash from Hell, edited by Mirha-Soleil Ross. The anthology is a compilation of a 1990s trans zine of the same name created by Ross and her girlfriend Xanthra Phillippa MacKay in Toronto, Canada. The original gendertrash helped shape a growing trans cultural movement and was well-remembered in the trans community, but had received little broader attention. The anthology, with an introduction by poet Trish Salah and afterword by historian Leah Tigers, was the first to collect the zine into a book and share it for a wider audience. The collection is a finalist for the 2026 Leslie Feinberg Award for Trans and Gender-Variant literature.

=== 2026 ===
Persona, by Aoife Josie Clements, was released in January 2026. The horror novel was Clements' debut. It received praise and affirmations of its scariness from Nic Anstett in Autostraddle, Tobias Carroll in Vol. 1 Brooklyn, and a starred review from Publishers Weekly.

In April, the press published Missed Connections with Tall Girls, a poetry book by Gwen Aube. It was LittlePuss's first poetry book, and chosen because Plett felt she had to publish Aube's work after hearing Aube at an open mic. Aube had published the chapbook Pulp Necrosis in 2025, but Missed Connections was her first full book of poetry. It centered on the trans community, poverty, Windsor, and how people can have fun and work together for better futures.

The press planned to publish Violet Allen's romantasy novel Plastic, Prism, Void: Part One in May 2026.

== See also ==
- Arsenal Pulp Press
- Cleis Press
- Feminist Press
- Instar Books
- Zubaan Books
