= Imogen Binnie =

American novelist

- Born: 1978 or 1979 (age 47–48); New Jersey, U.S.
- Education: Rutgers University
- Occupation: Writer
- Children: 2
- Writing career
- Notable work: Nevada

Imogen Binnie (born 1978 or 1979) is an American novelist and screenwriter. She is best known for her debut novel, Nevada, which was published in 2013. It is considered a key work in trans literature.

== Early life ==
Binnie was born and raised in rural New Jersey. She attended Rutgers University and graduated in 2002 after majoring in English and psychology. After graduating, she lived in New York City for a time before moving to Oakland, California. She began sharing her work via Fictionmania, a site devoted to sharing user-written stories on gender change. She then moved to creating zines and developing her artistry in writing groups.

== Career ==
Binnie was a columnist at Maximum Rocknroll magazine for 9 years. Her early writing appeared in two zines she self-published, The Fact That It's Funny Doesn't Make It A Joke and Stereotype Threat. While living in Oakland after 2007, Binnie was so tired of explaining to cisgender people why they shouldn't call trans people the slur "trannies" that she created a zine compiling three trans writers' arguments against the slur. She kept copies in her purse to share with people who used the word. She also discovered books during this time that would influence her later writing: This Bridge Called My Back, edited by Cherríe Moraga and Gloria E. Anzaldúa, works by Dennis Cooper and Junot Díaz, and Joanna Russ' essay "What Can a Heroine Do? or Why Women Can’t Write".

Binnie began writing articles for PrettyQueer.com, a site begun in 2011 by the four future founders of Topside Press. This was the first time Binnie received payment for her writing and it came in a lull while she tried to publish her first novel.

=== Nevada ===
Binnie's debut novel, Nevada, was published by Topside Press in 2013. The novel's plot centres around Maria, a transgender woman leaving New York after a break up. The novel is intended to primarily address a transgender audience. Some people credit Nevada as the first novel in a modern wave of trans literature. Katherine Cross identifies authors like Binnie, Casey Plett, Janet Mock, and Ryka Aoki as the vanguard of trans women authors who created a new tradition of unapologetic, dark and authentic trans narratives. These works tend to discard prior tropes about trans people that were usually employed in works for cisgender audiences, and instead the works showcase the personal experience of being trans and the impacts of transmisogyny.

At the 26th Lambda Literary Awards in 2014, Nevada was a finalist for the Transgender Fiction category, and Binnie won both the Betty Berzon Emerging Writer Award and the MOTHA award for "outstanding contribution to the transgender cultural landscape."

In 2021, Picador signed Nevada for publication in the UK for the first time, citing it as a "genuinely ground-breaking book, which has trenchant and inspired things to say about the trans experience". This same year, MCD announced it would reissue the book for wider distribution than the original run.

=== Short stories ===
Binnie has published several short stories, including "Gamers", in Meanwhile, Elsewhere (Topside Press, 2017) and "I Met a Girl Named Bat Who Met Jeffrey Palmer" published in the Lambda Award winning collection, The Collection: Short Fiction from the Transgender Vanguard (Topside Press, 2012). An essay by Binnie is featured in Videogames for Humans (Instar, 2017).

In much of Binnie's writing, her characters are not explicitly labeled as trans at the beginning of the story, which lets her explore how readers of art forms interpret stories through their own experiences. The unpublished short story "If You Leave" is a retelling of Andie Walsh's story from the film Pretty in Pink, casting Walsh as a punk rock trans girl who overcomes class and gender prejudices to find love. Andrew J. Young cites this short story as an example of a technique that trans and queer people use to read mainstream works through a queer lens. The technique has a long tradition because mainstream works frequently have not depicted or prioritized a queer audience.

=== TV writing ===
Binnie was a script writer for Doubt, a short-lived American TV drama which premiered on CBS in 2017. She wrote the August 5, 2017, episode "I'm In If You Are."

In 2020, she was a script writer for Council of Dads, an American TV drama which premiered on NBC. She wrote the May 28, 2020, fifth episode "Tradition!"

Most recently, Binnie co-wrote and was the executive story editor for teen drama Cruel Summer.

In May 2022, Binnie appeared on the podcast Gender Reveal, hosted by Tuck Woodstock.

== Personal life ==
Binnie is a transgender woman. She credits Camp Trans for saving her life: it was the first time she could spend time in person with a trans community. She met Julie Blair and Red Durkin there, who connected her later to Topside Press. Binnie moved from New York to Oakland in 2007 but felt out of place in the queer community there: while there were many trans people, she did not know many trans women, and the community wasn't always inclusive.

As of 2022, Binnie lives in Vermont, where she works as a therapist. She and her wife have two children.

== See also ==
- Akwaeke Emezi
- Emily St. James
- Jeanne Thornton
- Mira Bellwether
- Mirha-Soleil Ross
- Roz Kaveney
- Torrey Peters
