= Little Fish (novel) =

2018 novel by Casey Plett

- Author: Casey Plett
- Language: English
- Genre: Fiction
- Publisher: Arsenal Pulp Press
- Publication date: May 1, 2018
- Publication place: Canada
- Media type: Print
- Awards: Lambda Literary Award for Transgender Fiction
- ISBN: 9781551527208

Little Fish is a novel by Casey Plett, published May 1, 2018 by Arsenal Pulp Press. Centring transgender characters in Plett's hometown of Winnipeg, the book won the Lambda Literary Award for Transgender Fiction in 2018.

The book's title refers to a line in the song Violet from Hole's album, Live Through This, which the protagonist, Wendy, listens to several times throughout.

In 2023, film option rights for the book sold to Canadian filmmaker Louise Weard and will be adapted by independent production company Black Mansion Films.

== Reception ==
Booklist's Michael Cart provided a positive review, stating, "Plett writes extremely well, creating a mood and tone that match Wendy’s dark emotions and uncertainties. This character-driven novel is a welcome addition to the slender body of transgender fiction."

The Globe and Mail named Little Fish one of the best 100 books of the year.

Year	Award	Result	Ref.
2018	Lambda Literary Award for Transgender Fiction	Winner	
2019	Amazon Canada First Novel Award	Winner	
2019	Dayne Ogilvie Prize for LGBTQ Emerging Writers	Shortlist	
2019	Carol Shields Winnipeg Book Award	Shortlist	
2019	Firecracker Award for Fiction	Winner	
