= Ryka Aoki =

American author

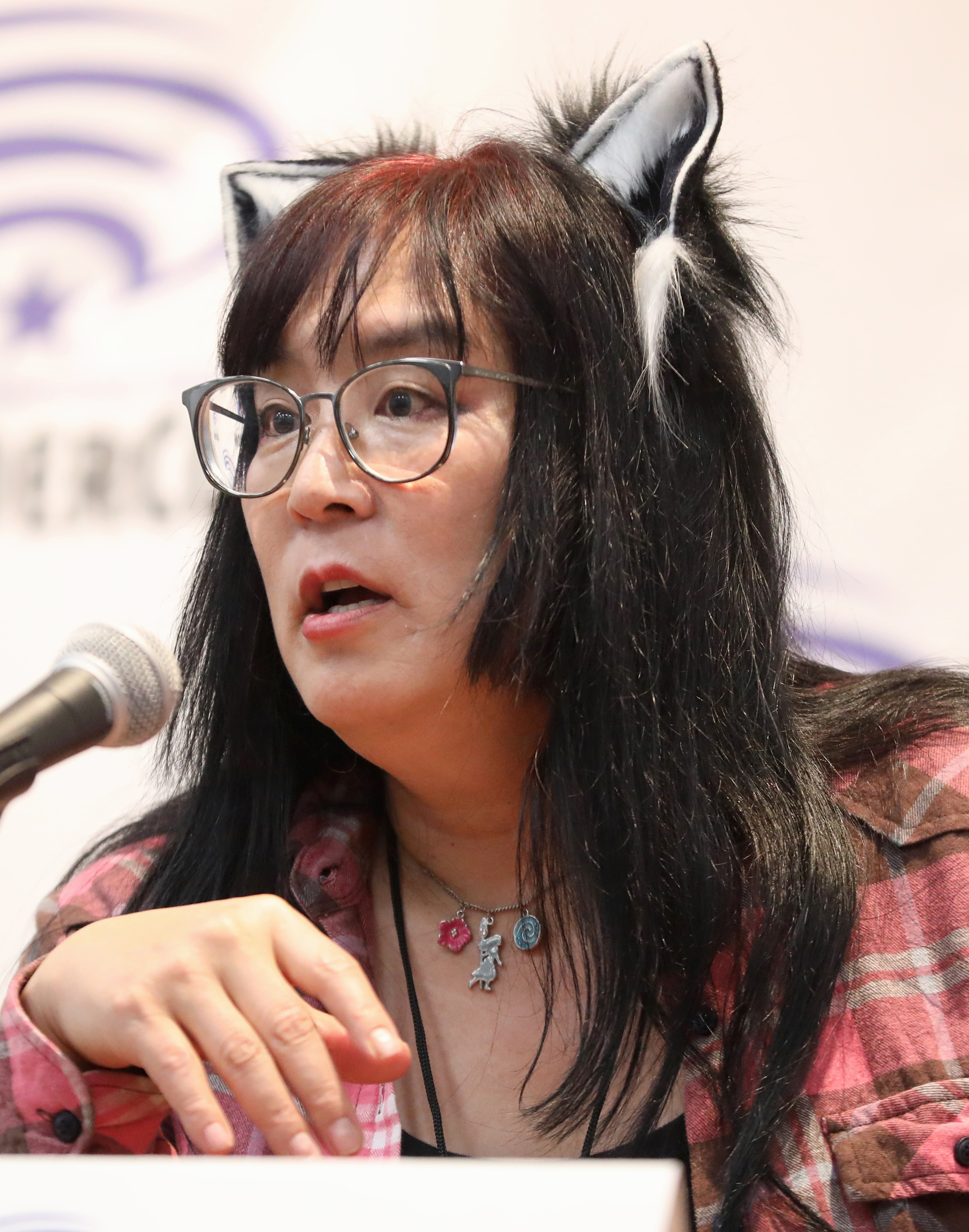
- Aoki at the 2024 WonderCon
- Education: Cornell University (MFA)
- Occupations: Writer, teacher and composer
- Website: rykaryka.com

Ryka Aoki is an American author of novels, poetry, and essays. She teaches English at Santa Monica College and gender studies at Antioch University.

Aoki's work includes the poetry collections Seasonal Velocities and Why Dust Shall Never Settle Upon This Soul, along with the novels He Mele a Hilo and Light from Uncommon Stars. Both Seasonal Velocities and Why Dust Shall Never Settle Upon This Soul were finalists at the Lambda Literary Awards for respective years. Light from Uncommon Stars was nominated for a 2022 Hugo Award for Best Novel and a 2022 Ray Bradbury Prize and was awarded the 2021 Otherwise Award at Wiscon 46 in May 2023.

== Early life and education ==
Born to Japanese American parents, Aoki grew up in Southern California in the San Gabriel Valley. Aoki studied chemistry at the University of California, Los Angeles, after her parents initially discouraged her from becoming a writer. She is a first-generation college graduate. After graduating, Aoki spent a year working as an environmental lab technician.

Aoki earned her Master of Fine Arts degree in creative writing from Cornell University, and won the Academy of American Poets' University Award. She was honored by the California State Senate for her work with Trans/Giving, a Los Angeles performance series for trans and genderqueer individuals.

== Career ==
Aoki published Seasonal Velocities in 2012 with Trans-Genre Press. The collection includes poetry, essays, and stories. It focuses on the human experience, and on trans stories of love and abuse. Aoki started writing the book under a previous publishing deal that fell apart. Pivoting, she contacted A. J. Bryce, who had created the Trans-Genre Project, an online database of works made by trans artists. She convinced him to expand into publishing for the trans community, and Seasonal Velocities became Trans-Genre Press's first published book. Bryce claims the work is the first both produced by a trans person and published by a trans-run company. It was published months before Topside Press's first publication. Bryce also credits the book with prompting the creation of the Lambda Literary Award for Transgender Poetry. Seasonal Velocities was a finalist for their Transgender Nonfiction category instead.

Aoki, who is a trans woman, has said that she strives not to write just for other transgender readers, but for their family, and other people in general. Her book He Mele a Hilo was meant to chronicle the common Hawaiian experience. In addition to her book, Aoki also wrote a piece for Publishers Weekly. She hopes that through writing for a general audience instead of only trans people, that she can help others see transgender people as human. Aoki wrote: "If a trans musician can make the audience cry by playing Chopin, how else, but as a human, can she be regarded? And if a book written by a queer trans Asian American can make you think of your own beaches, your own sunsets, or the dear departed grandmother you loved so much and even now find yourself speaking to, then what more powerful statement of our common humanity can there be?"

In 2009, Aoki appeared in the documentary, Diagnosing Difference, directed by filmmaker Annalise Ophelian. The following year, she appeared in Angelo Madsen Minax's Riot Acts: Flaunting Gender Deviance in Music Performance. Aoki was credited as a writer in the 2019 sci-fi film, Transfinite.

An interview with Aoki was featured in the 2014 book, Queer and Trans Artists of Color: Stories of Some of Our Lives, by Nia King, which was named one of The Advocate's Best Transgender Non-Fiction Books of 2014. Aoki toured with the Tranny Roadshow and the Fully Functional Cabaret, creating visible performance space for trans people across the country.

In 2015, Aoki published her first book solely dedicated to poetry: Why Dust Shall Never Settle Upon This Soul. Cat Fitzpatrick praised the collection for Lambda Literary Review. The work was a finalist for the Lambda Literary Award for Transgender Poetry.

In 2021, Aoki released Light from Uncommon Stars. She has described the book as being in part influenced by the story of Ted Ngoy, the Cambodian American entrepreneur known as the "Donut King", stating that she wanted "to open my own literary donut shop". Kirkus Reviews described the book as "filled with mouthwatering descriptions of food and heart-swelling meditations on music". Writing for Tor.com, Maya Gittelman described Light from Uncommon Stars as "often a joy to read ... also often painful to read", and being "written with profound catharsis, forgiveness when it’s due, and so, so much hope"; likewise, Alana Joli Abbott described the book as "an incredibly powerful story of hope and redemption" for Den of Geek.

In 2023, she was also awarded the 2023 Jim Duggins, PhD Outstanding Mid-Career Novelist Prize by Lambda Literary Foundation and was given a $5000 prize.

== Personal life ==
Aoki holds a black belt in judo, which she began training in at age 9. She is a former judo junior national champion and served as head judo coach at both Cornell University and UCLA. As of 2021, Aoki led Supernova Martial Arts, a self-defense and martial arts program, and taught self-defense seminars in Southern California. On teaching self-defense, Aoki explained:

I feel that everybody deserves as much safety as possible, but a lot of self-defense classes when I started out had been taught by cisgender people who didn’t understand the various issues that a trans woman will face, even the type of violence, which is completely different.

== Selected works ==
=== Books ===
- Aoki, Ryka (2012). Seasonal Velocities. Trans-Genre Press. ISBN 978-0-9851105-0-5.
- —— (2014). He Mele a Hilo. Topside Press. ISBN 978-1-62729-007-4.
- —— (2015). Why Dust Shall Never Settle Upon This Soul. biyuti publishing. ISBN 978-0-9919008-5-5.
- —— (2021). Light from Uncommon Stars. Tor Books. ISBN 978-1-250-78906-8.

=== Short stories ===
- Aoki, Ryka (2017). "The Gift". In Fitzpatrick, Cat; Plett, Casey (eds.). Meanwhile, Elsewhere: Science Fiction and Fantasy from Transgender Writers. New York: Topside Press. pp. 393–405. ISBN 978-1-62729-018-0.

== Awards ==
- Named #6 in the Britannica list of 13 LGBTQ Writers You Should Read
- Listed by PBS as 5 LGBTQ+ Poets You Should Read This Pride Month
