= Jeanne Thornton =

American author (born 1983)

Jeanne Thornton (born 1983) is an American writer and copublisher of Instar Books and Rocksalt Magazine. Her published novels include A/S/L and Summer Fun, which won the Lambda Literary Award for Transgender Fiction.

She has received the Judith A. Markowitz Award for Emerging LGBTQ Writers. Anthologies to which she has contributed to have won a Lambda Literary Award and a Barbara Gittings Literature Award. Works she has written and edited have been finalists for Lambda Literary Awards for Debut Fiction, Transgender Fiction, and Graphic Novel.

== Career ==
Thornton is a writer of novels and short stories, as well as a co-publisher of Instar Books and Rocksalt Magazine. She has also worked as a senior editor at Feminist Press.

Thornton's first novel, The Dream of Doctor Bantam, was published in 2012.

=== Instar Books ===
Thornton publishes Instar Books with Miracle Jones, who she met in 2003 during college. Jones said that Instar was influenced by the Wu-Tang Clan, and Thornton explained, "maybe this is where the Wu ethos enters: finding ways to function as a small society and collective that interfaces with capitalism but sources what it does in some kind of hard-to-assimilate way that brings joy."

Instar focuses on digital publishing, and has released zines, anthologies, and books. Besides works by Thornton and Jones, Instar has published works by Jonathan Reiss, Imogen Binnie, and Calvin Gimpelvich.

Instar also released a series of small books on different internet subcultures, Remember the Internet, in the vein of 33 1/3 and Boss Fight. The books include Ana Valens' recounting of the Tumblr porn community, Megan Milks' review of a Tori Amos bootleg recording trading scene, Quinn Myers' explanation of Google Glass fans, and Noor Al-Sibai's history of MySpace.

Casey Plett said Thornton's mentorship and publishing experience helped Plett enter into indie publishing with LittlePuss Press. Instar Press had been distributed by Small Press Distribution before that company shut down; in response, the Community of Literary Magazines and Presses gave Instar a $5,000 grant and one year membership via a new Small Press Future Fund.

=== Summer Fun ===
Thornton's 2021 novel Summer Fun is a one-sided epistolary novel consisting of letters from a transgender woman in New Mexico to a fictional musician based on Brian Wilson of the Beach Boys; The book is inspired by Wilson's creation of the unfinished album Smile. It won the 2022 Lambda Literary Award for Transgender Fiction.

In a starred review for BookPage, Laura Sackton wrote that Summer Fun is "dizzying and deliciously weird, it's a sprawling yet intimate story about music, hidden trans histories and the transformative act of creation." Corinne Manning, for The Brooklyn Rail, deemed the book "as much mystery as cultural analysis", and it "rewards the reader by never giving us what we expect or what we think we want." Kirkus Reviews said the book had uneven pacing but great ideas and prose. Publishers Weekly gave a mixed review, calling the book "spirited if overstuffed".

Cat Fitzpatrick, reviewing for Strange Horizons, described the book as a counter-history that haunts readers with the idea of "a hopeless America, one in which there is nothing redeemable, not even the art of desperate, lonely, beautiful, crazy transsexual women." Fitzpatrick described a scene where two trans women meet as having "tremendous power", especially because it occurs in the 1960s, and there is rarely historical documentation of such meetings. She contrasted this with the 1993 short film Gender Troublemakers by Jeanne B and Xanthra Phillippa, perhaps the earliest intentional document of trans social culture.

=== A/S/L ===
In 2025, Thornton released the novel A/S/L, which features Abraxa, Sash, and Lilith. They meet as teenagers online in 1998 and collaborate to try making an online role-playing game that will change the world. The book covers their eventual reunion in 2016 when one of them returns to working on the game. The protagonists are transfemme.

Thornton was inspired by her own teenage experiences with the ZZT community on the early internet, which provided escapism and let her join fandom communities, create queer spaces for herself, and experiment with different identities. The book is written for trans audiences but Thornton describes it as useful for cisgender readers learning about the trans experience: "You’re reading across the power differential because it is going to enrich your sense of what’s going on in the world. If you’re in the truck, you don’t perceive who is under the truck. The only way you’re going to see that is to try to get better at listening and try to get better at checking the truck as you’re driving it."

Kirkus Reviews describes A/S/L as "dazzlingly creative and heartfelt", saying Thornton has a "skillful command of worldbuilding" across virtual and physical worlds, and she "writes with profound, incisive authority about relationships". Erin Vachon, reviewing for The Rumpus, says the book "boasts a ’90s chatroom scene that is so funny and sharp on gender dynamics, it should be textbook reading on constructing dialogue." Autumn West, in a Library Journal review, says it is "a one-of-a-kind book, with a great idea propelling it, though it could have been executed more clearly." AudioFile praised Thornton's narration of A/S/L's audiobook. A/S/L won The Transfeminine Review's Reader's Choice Awards for Best Transfeminine Fiction in 2025.

== Personal life ==
Thornton grew up in Texas. She is a transgender woman. She came out to an online community in 2006 and more widely in 2010. Thornton lived in Austin, Texas from 2011 to 2014.

== Awards ==
Awards Received
Year	Award	Work	Thornton's role	Result	Ref.
2022	Lambda Literary Award for Transgender Fiction	Summer Fun	Author	Winner	
2022	Ferro-Grumley Award for LGBTQ Fiction	Summer Fun	Author	Finalist	
2018	Barbara Gittings Literature Award	Meanwhile, Elsewhere: Science Fiction and Fantasy from Transgender Writers	Contributor	Winner	
2018	Lambda Literary Award for Anthology	Meanwhile, Elsewhere: Science Fiction and Fantasy from Transgender Writers	Contributor	Finalist	
2019	Lambda Literary Award for LGBT Graphic Novel	We're Still Here: An All-Trans Comics Anthology	Editor	Finalist	
2018	Lambda Literary Award for Transgender Fiction	Transcendent 2: The Year's Best Transgender Speculative Fiction 2016	Contributor	Winner	
2018	Lambda Literary Award for Transgender Fiction	The Black Emerald	Author	Finalist	
2018	Judith A. Markowitz Award for Emerging LGBTQ Writers		Self	Winner	
2012	Lambda Literary Award for Debut Fiction	The Dream of Doctor Bantam	Author	Finalist	

== Bibliography ==
=== Writer ===
- A/S/L (2025)
- Summer Fun (2021)
- The Black Emerald (2014)
- The Dream of Doctor Bantam (2012)

=== Editor ===
- We're Still Here: An All-Trans Comics Anthology (2018)

=== Contributor ===
- Meanwhile, Elsewhere: Science Fiction and Fantasy from Transgender Writers (2017)
- Transcendent 2: The Year's Best Transgender Speculative Fiction 2016 (2017)
- Procyon Science Fiction Anthology 2016 (2016)
- Where We're Going We Don't Need Roads (2014)
- Tales of Two Cities: The Best and Worst of Times In Today's New York (2014)
