= Light from Uncommon Stars =

2021 novel by Ryka Aoki

- First edition
- Author: Ryka Aoki
- Language: English
- Genre: Science fiction; Fantasy; LGBTQ fiction
- Set in: San Gabriel Valley
- Publisher: Tor Books, St Martin's Press
- Publication date: September 28, 2021
- Publication place: United States of America
- Media type: Print (hardcover)
- Pages: 384
- Awards: 2021 Otherwise Award, 2022 Alex Award, and 2022 Stonewall Book Award
- ISBN: 978-1-250-78906-8 (Tor Books version)

Light from Uncommon Stars is a science fiction and fantasy novel by American author and poet Ryka Aoki. The novel won the 2021 Otherwise Award, 2022 Alex Award, and 2022 Stonewall Book Award, and was nominated for multiple other awards.

== Plot ==
Shizuka Satomi is the world's best violin teacher, known for coaching virtuosos who meet tragic ends. Years ago, she struck a deal with a demon that she would deliver seven souls to hell. To do this, she coaches ambitious violin students, then offers them fame and renown in exchange for their souls. Satomi has delivered six souls already, and with a year left on her contract, she needs one more student. She finds that student in Katrina Nguyen, a young transgender prodigy with little formal training.

As Satomi teaches Nguyen, she also meets Lan Tran, a starship captain and refugee disguised as a doughnut shop owner, who has brought her family to Earth to escape war and a deadly plague. The two strike up a tenuous flirtation, but their budding romance is imperiled by Satomi's deal with the demon and Tran's tumultuous galactic past.

== Reception ==
In a review for Tor, Maya Gittelman called Light from Uncommon Stars "one of the best speculative novels I’ve ever read" and that it "reminds me what genre is capable of."

In a review for Locus, Caren Gussoff praised the novel's portrayal of women and its use of speculative fiction tropes to explore the meaning of womanhood in the modern day. However, Gussoff criticized the male characters as "two-dimensional 'not-women'" and thought that the ending was "too sweet" given the stakes of the novel.

Light from Uncommon Stars won the 2021 Otherwise Award, as well as the 2022 Alex Award. In 2022, it was an honor book for the Barbara Gittings Literature Award; finalist for the Hugo Award for Best Novel, Locus Award for Best Fantasy Novel, Mythopoeic Fantasy Award for Adult Literature, and Ray Bradbury Prize. Booklist and Kirkus Reviews named the novel one of the best novels of 2021, and the New York Public Library included it on their list of the top ten books of the year.
