= Detransition, Baby =

2021 novel by Torrey Peters

- Front Cover
- Author: Torrey Peters
- Language: English
- Genre: Literary fiction, Transgender literature
- Set in: Brooklyn
- Publisher: One World (imprint of Penguin Random House)
- Publication date: January 12, 2021
- Publication place: United States
- Media type: Print
- ISBN: 0593133374

Detransition, Baby is a 2021 novel by American author Torrey Peters. It is her debut novel and was published by One World (an imprint of Penguin Random House). The novel was met with critical success and praise for crafting a tender exploration of gender, parenthood, love, and trans life.

== Plot ==
The main characters are Reese, a trans woman and former partner of Amy; Amy, who detransitioned to live as a man and became Ames; and Katrina, a Chinese Jewish cis woman who is Ames's boss and current lover. All three are in their thirties and live in Brooklyn. After the end of their relationship, Reese and Ames have been estranged because of Ames's decision to detransition three years ago.

Katrina discovers that she is pregnant with Ames's child, though Ames was misguided by his doctor, who conveyed to Ames that he would be sterile because of his time on hormone replacement therapy. Ames reveals to Katrina that he spent six years living as an out trans woman before deciding to socially detransition due to associated risks of transphobia; in particular, increased risk of violence. Although he is certain he is not a man, he is still unsure of his gender identity. Because of his complicated relationship with his gender, Ames is hesitant to accept the role of a father to a child in a heterotypical family because of the label's social connotations of masculinity.

Ames reconnects with Reese, who has long wanted to mother a child of her own, believing that the three of them could form an unconventional family to raise the baby together. Reese grapples with the same self-destructive coping mechanisms that soured her old relationship with Amy, including sex with married men and chasers, while Ames tries to navigate life as a man again. Katrina attempts to adjust to a different understanding of gender and questions her own queerness, but intends to get an abortion if she cannot be sure she will have a support system. The three question their identities, their relationships with each other, and if they could form a stable family.

The book is separated into sections that move in time from years before the conception of Katrina's child to weeks after conception and explore both the nature of Reese and Amy's relationship and the negotiation of a possible family dynamic for the trio.

== Characters ==
=== Reese ===
One of the protagonists and a narrator of some chapters. She is a trans woman and former partner of Ames. She deeply values motherhood as a part of her identity as a woman, and wishes she could have her own child. Because she cannot become pregnant, she instead works in childcare and mentors other young trans women, including Ames when he presented as a trans woman.

=== Ames/Amy ===
One of the protagonists and a narrator of some chapters. Ames, or Amy before his detransition, was Reese's lover for a period. After their detransition, Ames is still unsure of his identity as a male and struggles with the expectations of fatherhood. He feels as though the social circumstances of the world led him to detransition, not his personal alignment to the gender identity. Ames works for Katrina and his relationship with her has resulted in the pregnancy that is a focal point for this book.

=== Katrina ===
Katrina is a Chinese Jewish cisgender woman who is Ames's boss and current lover. Before the events of the novel she experienced a miscarriage that led to her divorce with her former husband. Through her relationship with Ames and later Reese, she begins questioning her own identity as a heterosexual woman and potential mother.

=== Stanley ===
Stanley is a cisgender man who had a relationship with Reese prior to Reese and Amy's relationship. The two characters originally met through a website geared towards cisgender men who fetishize transgender women. Reese and Stanley have a brief affair while Amy and Reese are dating and living together. This affair eventually contributes to Amy and Reese ending their relationship together.

=== Garrett (The Cowboy) ===
Garrett is one of Reese's lovers, whom she refers to as her “cowboy." Garrett is married and previously contracted HIV from another trans woman with whom he cheated on his wife. Garrett uses Reese only for sex and keeps his relationship with her and his own family separate.

== Background ==
Peters has stated that the character of Ames is inspired by an experience she had in 2016, when she visited Mexico and wore a suit to pass as male and avoid questions from customs about her male passport. Peters reflected that the novel is written in the genre of a soap opera and that the novel's characters talk "how I talk with my friends." In 2021, Peters said that while she was writing the book in 2018, "I was just thinking about what was going to be funny for my friends and what was pertinent to our lives", and "I had the freedom to imagine trans people as just quotidian, boring, flawed people. I wasn't engaging with trans people as an embattled group."

The dedication for Detransition, Baby is addressed to "divorced cis women". Peters' reasoning for this is that "divorced cis women must start over at a point in adulthood when they're supposed to be established", which she compares to what trans women experience.

Detransition, Baby was one of the first novels written by an out trans person to be published by a big-five publishing house.

== Reception ==
Kirkus called Detransition, Baby "a wonderfully original exploration of desire and the evolving shape of family. Writing for The New Yorker, Crispin Long identifies the novel as "a bourgeois comedy of manners" and notes that Peters is "refreshingly uninterested in persuading the public of the bravery and nobility of trans people, and lets them be as dysfunctional as anyone else." In a review for Vox, Emily St. James praised the depiction of Ames as someone "just trying to fumble his way through a life that has afforded him very few good options." Several reviewers listed its passage comparing trans women to "juvenile elephants" as a particularly strong point in the book's thesis.

Detransition, Baby was nominated for the 2021 Women's Prize for Fiction, making Peters the first openly trans woman nominated for the award. The longlisting of Peters was met with some controversy from those who did not consider her to be a woman. A letter argued that she is male and therefore should not be eligible for the prize. Its list of signatories included atheist writer Ophelia Benson and environmentalist Rebecca Lush, as well as anonymous supporters using pseudonyms of long-dead authors e.g. Emily Dickinson and Willa Cather. Authors including Melinda Salisbury, Joanne Harris, and Naoise Dolan—another nominee for the 2021 prize—condemned the letter and expressed their support for Peters. The organisers of the prize released a statement condemning the letter and defending the decision to nominate Peters' book.

In early 2021, a TV adaptation of Detransition, Baby was announced. Grey's Anatomy writer-producers Joan Rater and Tony Phelan were named the showrunners for the drama/comedy. In a March 2025 interview, Peters mentioned the project was "dead...it was just the vagaries of Hollywood."
