= Confessions of the Fox =

2018 novel by Jordy Rosenberg

- First edition
- Author: Jordy Rosenberg
- Language: English
- Publisher: Penguin Random House
- Publication place: United States of America
- English publication date: 2018

Confessions of the Fox is a novel by American writer and academic Jordy Rosenberg, first published in 2018. It re-imagines the lives of Jack Sheppard, eighteenth-century English thief and jail-breaker, and his lover Edgeworth Bess.

== Plot ==
The novel is structured as a story within a story. A 21st-century academic, Dr Voth, discovers a manuscript that claims to be the confessions of Jack Sheppard. The manuscript reveals that Sheppard (like Voth) is a transgender man, and describes his experience of transitioning gender. It also reveals that Bess is of South Asian (Lascar) descent and that she grew up in the Fens. The manuscript documents Sheppard's love affair with Bess, their criminal escapades, their memories of childhood, and their run-ins with authority. Voth's annotations to the manuscript begin as scholarly comments on its likely authenticity but soon become more personal, comically documenting his recent break-up and his difficulties at work. The novel offers satirical commentary on historical and contemporary political issues, including over-policing and surveillance, racism, the dredging of the Fens, and managerialism in 21st-century universities.

In fictionalizing Sheppard's story, the novel continues a tradition established by Daniel Defoe, John Gay (The Beggar's Opera), Bertolt Brecht and Kurt Weill (The Threepenny Opera).

== Main characters ==
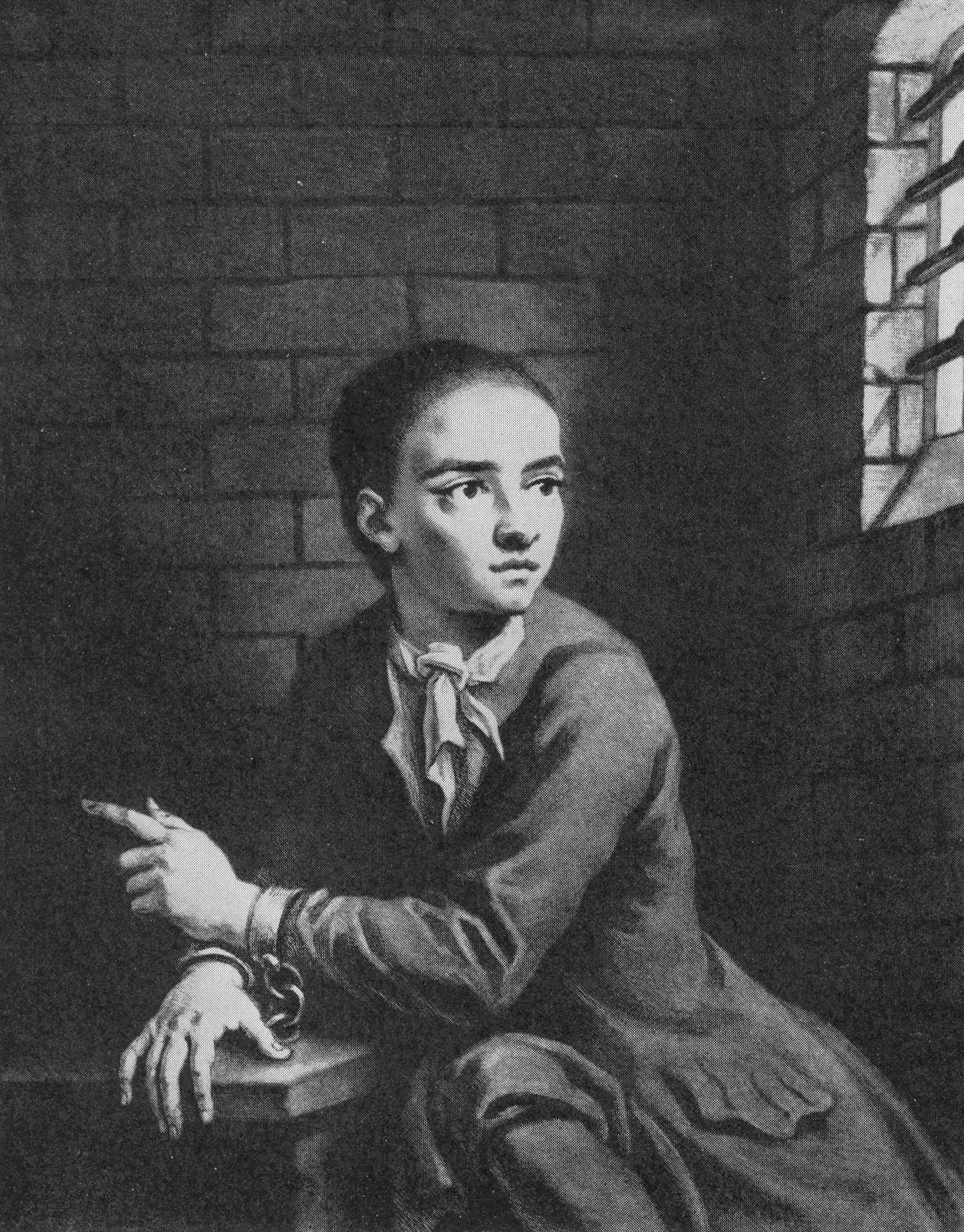
Image of famous historical figure, Jack Sheppard

=== Jack Sheppard ===
In the novel, Jack Sheppard is a trans man who previously was an apprentice to a carpenter turned to theft and prison break artist. His work with a carpenter gave him the skills to be able to break out of jail four separate times, making him the most wanted criminal in London. His illegal work as a thief parallels with forbidden queerness in 18th century London. He has a relationship with prostitute, Edgeworth Bess, who finally enables him to identify himself as a man instead of his biological sex. During the novel, she was the one who performed top surgery on him, allowing his physical body to match his identity. Eventually, another infamous London criminal, Jonathon Wild, turned Sheppard in and he was eventually executed in 1724 at the age of 22.

Rosenberg's fictional Jack Sheppard is based on the historical folk hero who lived in London in the 18th century, but this is not a true account. According to Rosenberg, it is unclear if the real Sheppard 'thought of himself, as trans or not trans', but he notes that in many works Sheppard is represented in a way that 'we might see now as genderqueer or gender nonconforming', and it was his small and flexible frame that helped him escape confinement so many times.

=== Edgeworth Bess ===
Elizabeth Khan, also known as Edgeworth Bess, was Jack's main love interest in the novel. Bess was a prostitute in London who had a severe disregard for authority and the law. She has an interesting background in that she identified as "lascar" who was brought to London as part of England's East India Company. In the book, she is described to be of Southeast Asian descent. She was a free spirit, made clear through her willingness to accept Jack in a society that would not.

The historical figure of Bess was actually named Bess Lyon, and Rosenberg's account of her is fictional.

=== Jonathan Wild ===
Jonathan Wild, prominent London criminal disguised as a constable

As Jack emerged into the world of thievery, he learned about the famous Jonathan Wild. Jonathan ran a business of thievery in London, though he disguised himself as a constable. After hearing about Jack Sheppard, he tried to recruit him to join his gang. Bess urged Jack to work to be a "freelance roguer" instead of joining into Wild's organized heists that revolved around bribery. When Sheppard refused Wild's offer, he was furious. Wild eventually was a major player in Jack's final arrest and his eventual sentencing to death.

=== Dr. Voth ===
Dr. Voth is the fictional character who discovered and is editing the manuscript. His footnotes give the reader a better understanding of who he is and why he is so fascinated by this manuscript. He is a professor at a university but is put on unpaid leave, giving him unlimited time to focus on this manuscript. It is clear he has many qualms with the university that he works at, and also discusses his personal life, specifically his struggles of dating as a queer man. Dr. Voth's character adds a playful and comedic spin to the novel, which contrasts with the more grim aspects of the manuscript.

== Themes ==
=== Identity ===
The character of Jack is a trans man, and his genitalia are described as being somewhat ambiguous, suggesting that he is intersex- though no specific intersex variation is described. The lack of focus on his genitalia insinuates the fact that his biological sex is not relevant, as he eventually defines himself as a man. Furthermore, Rosenberg claims in an interview that this combined with the numerous terms to discuss genitalia all were to somewhat mock the cis-het conventions around the rigid relationship between desire and certain body parts. Rosenberg says that he was intending for the experience of genital resignification to help structure his novel. It must also be noted that Jack's gender identity would be considered differently in modern terminology to that of the 18th century, so whilst readers can recognise that his character is transgender, a large part of his identity relies on the ambiguity of his gender identity at the time.

In the beginning of the book, the carpenter he apprentices calls him "girl", but when Bess refers to him as a "handsome boy", he is relieved to realize that he can identify himself however he wishes. Bess is a major player in him being able to come into his own skin, and is the first woman he feels confident enough to have an intimate relationship with. Though being transgender was not acceptable in 18th century London, Bess accepted Jack which allowed him to accept himself as well. Despite an entire police force after him and the looming prospect of the death penalty, Jack's greatest fear was that his biological identity will be discovered and he will be forced to revert to living like how he did before he represented himself as a man.

These themes are also present in the framing narrative of Dr. Voth, the editor of the manuscript, as he is also a transgender man. In the footnotes, he discusses the struggles of dating in the 21st century while transgender. Not only this, but Dr. Voth's identity as an academic makes his narration of Jack's story more credible; he is a trustworthy narrator and validates Jack's experience of trans identity through the mode of academia.

=== Criticism of Academia ===
One of the reasons Dr. Voth is so infatuated with the manuscript is because he reveals he has been put on unpaid leave by the Dean of Surveillance for "improperly utilized leisure"—playing phone Scrabble during office hours. There are many references throughout the book at his disappointment in the way he is treated as a professor at a university, and appreciates the opportunity to be able to immerse himself in the manuscript, which is something he was extremely interested in. However, he later is angered when a company called P-Quad Publishers and Pharmaceuticals coerces the manuscript from him. The university claims Voth is legally obligated to turn the manuscript over, which furthers his resentment to the institution and capitalism in general.

It is interesting to consider the possibility that as an academic himself, was Rosenberg touching on his own frustrations with his experiences working at a university? In an interview, he discusses the holistic life of study. He explains that from his time working in academia, he has come to the belief that university's goal is to make its staff feel so insignificant, they will stop struggling for a space there. This is reminiscent of Dr. Voth's experience with the publishing company as they try to take the manuscript from him, and the university tells him he is obligated to do so. Rosenberg says that a lot of times, "there are things about the university that grinds people down so badly that they should certainly not feel compelled to continue to struggle there".

=== Liberation ===
Liberation is a theme that can be discovered in almost all aspects of the novel. Even in Dr. Voth's defiance of the university's wishes for him to surrender the manuscript, he is seen to free himself from the expectations the university has for him.

It is no mistake that Jack breaking social norms with his queerness parallels with his breaking of the law and defiance of London's new prison system. In the beginning of the novel, he is an apprentice to an abusive carpenter who literally chains him to his bed at night. At this time, Jack was still forced to identify with his biological sex, which was torturous for him. Ironically, using his expertise on locks from working with the apprentice was what allows him to break out of the chains at night. This was when he met Bess and identifies himself as a man, so he is not only physically liberated from the chains but also freeing himself from the constraints of society. Furthermore, Bess is a major reason why he is able to become liberated from the fear of his queerness being discovered; she instils confidence that he would not have been able to derive from himself.

=== The Trans Archive ===
In the novel, Dr. Voth acts as an archivist, by analysing, adding to, and preserving Jack's original manuscript. Rosenberg similarly acts as a trans archivist, highlighting the often ignored queer history of the period, and restoring this through the novel. Ana Horvat notes that the trans archive is "a critique of mainstream archives which have historically privileged only certain kinds of stories" and "a reaching back into the past to document queer/trans historical figures and establish a link between them and contemporary transness" - Rosenberg criticises historical archivism for its neglect of evident queerness, using a modern queer lens to restore a lost history. Engaging with archivism through a queer lens legitimises trans identities in both the present day and throughout history, stating that transgender people have always existed, and will continue to exist.

== 18th Century Queer Perspective ==
When asked Rosenberg's reasoning for reimagining Sheppard as a trans man living in 18th century London, he explains he wanted to combat the "cookie-cutter trans narratives" in mainstream culture in which transness is kept separate from other social forces; he hoped to connect things that mainstream media would like to keep in separate boxes. He notes that though it is not clear if Jack thought of himself as trans or not, he was continually described to be what can now be identified as genderqueer. Despite Jack's identification of himself, Rosenberg points out those identifications themself are anachronistic ways of thinking of sex and gender during this period.

Bess refers to Jack's transness as "somethingness", and this abstract description was intentional. Before Bess, Jack viewed his "somethingness" with severe shame and confusion, but she helps him become comfortable with himself. Rosenberg admits that his refusal to describe Jack's genitalia partly came from a "fear about mainstream readers' speculating gaze". This decision also touches on Rosenberg's belief that one's identity is so much more than their physical body. On the other hand, Dr. Voth is very explicit in his descriptions of his body. Rosenberg explains that in 18th century, he has found that writing about the body was literal and non-metaphorical. Therefore, it is as if Dr. Voth talks about his body in more of an 18th-century way while Shepphard writes in more of a modern tone in this sense. This blurring of the lines in describing the body between present and history was an intentional decision.

== Timeline of Transgender History ==
The term female husband was coined between the seventeenth and eighteenth century. The exact date that this term came about is unknown, but many historical figures exist as examples; one of the most famous examples being Charles Hamilton (female husband), after the publication of the 1746 fictionalised account of the trial written by Henry Fielding. Female husbands were almost always prosecuted after being accused of being women who lived as men and tried to seduce other women. These cases were reported the most in the seventeenth and eighteenth centuries, whereby in the female husband was regularly made out to have lied to their wives, being accused of defrauding her. Many nineteenth century figures such as James Barry (surgeon) and Albert Cashier lived their lives as the opposite gender to what they were assigned at birth, very often without people noticing. Barry was not discovered to be transgender until a post-mortem study. Alan L Hart was a key transgender figure in the twentieth century, with a variety of knowledge surrounding physics and radiology. Hart's grandparents and friends were supportive in his gender presentation. At this point in history, transitioning was beginning to call need medically. It is important to understand that up until the twenty-first century, transitioning has been perceived in numerous different ways, with a multitude of terms referring to the process of self discovery within gender. This history is important in Confessions of The Fox when observing the lives of two transgender characters in two different points throughout history, and noticing the difference in their identities and the responses from their surrounding society.

== Critical reception ==
The novel was named a "book of the year" by the New Yorker, Huffington Post, and Kirkus Reviews. It was a finalist for the 2019 Lambda Literary Award for Transgender Fiction and was shortlisted for the 2018 Center for Fiction First Novel Prize.
