= Topside Press =

Independent publisher of transgender literature

- Status: Defunct
- Founded: 2011
- Defunct: 2017
- Headquarters location: Brooklyn, New York
- Publication types: Books
- Fiction genres: Transgender literature, feminist literature
- Imprints: Topside Signature; Topside Heliotrope

Topside Press was an independent publisher of trans and feminist literature based in Brooklyn, New York that operated from 2011 to 2017. The press published fiction, memoirs, short story collections, poetry, and non-fiction (under the imprint, Topside Signature) by trans authors, for trans readers, and about trans characters. It is often credited as an important contributor to the "trans literary renaissance."

Topside Press’s list included novels such as Nevada by Imogen Binnie, which was a finalist for the Lambda Literary Award for transgender literature and was rereleased by Farrar, Straus and Giroux in 2022, and A Safe Girl to Love by Casey Plett, which won a Lambda Literary Award.

== Overview ==
Topside Press was founded by Tom Léger, Riley Macleod, Julie Blair, and Red Durkin after they were turned away by larger publishing companies that claimed that the market for trans literature was too limited. The four had previously overseen the trans writing blog PrettyQueer.com. In line with the message for their blog, Topside Press worked to promote “authentic transgender narratives” through publishing works by, for, and about trans people.

Topside's first publication was a collection of short stories titled The Collection: Short Fiction from the Transgender Vanguard (October 2012), edited by Léger and Macleod, featuring stories by Imogen Binnie, Carter Sickels, Ryka Aoki, and Casey Plett, among others. The Collection went on to win a Lambda Literary Award and has become a teaching text in college courses dealing with trans literature.

In March 2013, Topside published the first edition of Binnie’s Nevada, a “cult classic” of trans literature rereleased by Farrar, Straus and Giroux in 2022 and credited with contributing to the "golden age of trans literature."

In the summer of 2016, Topside hosted its inaugural Trans Women’s Writing Workshop, taught by writer and activist Sarah Schulman and Plett, at Brooklyn College.

The press released its last book in August 2017, a collection of speculative fiction short stories titled Meanwhile, Elsewhere: Science Fiction & Fantasy from Transgender Writers and edited by Plett and Cat Fitzpatrick. The anthology was reprinted in 2021 by the independent feminist publisher LittlePuss Press, which was founded by the anthology's two editors.

By 2017, the press had expanded to include two additional imprints: Topside Heliotrope, which focused on trans poetry, and Topside Signature, which focused on trans nonfiction.

Shortly after the release of the last book, the press disbanded due to “internal disputes between founders.” Since then, the press has been criticized for dominating the trans literary fiction scene, for acting as a gatekeeper for trans literature, and for publishing more well-educated white trans authors than trans authors of color. At the same time, the press is credited with contributing to the “trans literary renaissance."

During its five-year run, the press was awarded four Lambda awards and nominated for two more.

== Topside Test ==
Similar to the Bechdel test the owners of Topside came up with a set of criteria to establish if a story was transgender or just featured a trans character.

Does the book include more than one trans character?

Do they know each other?

Do they talk to each other about something besides a transition-related medical procedure?

== Notable Titles and Awards ==
- The Collection: Short Fiction from the Transgender Vanguard, eds. Tom Léger and Riley Macleod (2012), winner of the Lambda Literary Award in the category of Transgender Fiction
- My Awesome Place: The Autobiography of Cheryl B, Cheryl Burke (2012), winner of the Lambda Literary Award in the category of Bisexual
- Nevada, Imogen Binnie (2013), finalist for the Lambda Literary Award in Transgender Fiction
- A Safe Girl to Love, Casey Plett (2014), winner of the Lambda Literary Award in Transgender Fiction
- Reacquainted with Life, Kokumo (2016), winner of the Lambda Literary Award in Transgender Poetry
- Meanwhile, Elsewhere: Science Fiction & Fantasy from Transgender Writers, eds. Casey Plett and Cat Fitzpatrick (2017), finalist for the Lambda Literary Award in the category of Anthology, winner of the Barbara Gittings Literature Award
