= Casey Plett =

Canadian writer (born 1987)

- Born: June 20, 1987 (age 39); Winnipeg, Manitoba, Canada
- Occupation: Writer
- Writing career
- Period: 2010–present
- Notable works: A Safe Girl to Love, Little Fish, A Dream of a Woman
- Website: caseyplett.wordpress.com

Casey Plett (born June 20, 1987) is a Canadian writer, best known for her novel Little Fish, her Lambda Literary Award winning short story collection, A Safe Girl to Love, and her Giller Prize-nominated short story collection, A Dream of a Woman. Plett is a transgender woman, and she often centers this experience in her writing. Plett also co-founded LittlePuss Press with Cat Fitzpatrick.

== Personal life ==
Plett was born in Winnipeg, Manitoba and grew up in a Mennonite family in Morden, Manitoba. She attended high school in Eugene, Oregon, and later moved to Portland for college and New York for graduate school. She has lived in Windsor, Ontario. Plett currently teaches at Ohio University.

== Writing career ==
Plett previously wrote a regular column about her gender transition for McSweeney's Internet Tendency. She has also written about her transition for Defector's series, Histories of Transition. She is a book reviewer for the Winnipeg Free Press and has published work in Rookie, Plenitude, The Walrus, and Two Serious Ladies.

Plett has cited Imogen Binnie, Elena Rose, and Julia Serano as some of her influences.

=== A Safe Girl to Love ===
Plett's first short story collection was published in 2014: A Safe Girl to Love. It became a cult classic, sharing stories of trans women across a range of settings and experiences. It also won the 2014 Lambda Literary Award for Transgender Fiction. It was later reprinted by Arsenal Pulp Press with a new afterword from Plett in 2023.

=== Meanwhile, Elsewhere ===
Plett met Cat Fitzpatrick at a writer's conference in the early 2010s: later, Fitzpatrick asked Plett to co-edit a trans-authored speculative fiction anthology with her. This became Meanwhile, Elsewhere: Science Fiction and Fantasy From Transgender Writers, published by Topside Press. The anthology was likely the first speculative fiction collection written entirely by trans authors, and it won the 2018 Barbara Gittings Literature Award, a Stonewall Book Award. When the publisher disbanded soon after, Plett and Fitzpatrick decided to start LittlePuss Press to continue printing the work.

=== Little Fish ===
Plett published her debut novel in 2018, Little Fish. The book centers on Wendy, a trans woman in Winnipeg who weathers weeks of tragedy, learns that her grandfather may have been trans, and searches for trans culture and community across far distances.

Quill & Quire gave the book a starred review, saying it is a work that centers transness rather than sanitizing it or hiding the violence inflicted against trans women. Jonathan Valelly's review describes the story's portrayal of collective community and heroism, calling it "a book that invites us to witness something so important, so complex, and so tender".

=== A Dream of a Woman ===
In 2021, Plett published A Dream of a Woman, another short story collection with eight short stories about trans women. Elanor Broker, reviewing for Portland Mercury, praised it as the "leading edge of trans storytelling" and appreciated its stories set in Oregon and Portland, saying it elevated neglected experiences using deep stories anchored in local settings. Drew Burnett Gregory, reviewing for Autostraddle, says it is a trans love and forgiveness story, whose parts reveal deep nuances in that experience: with "immersive prose, they sting and salve, then sting again".

A Dream of a Woman was longlisted for the 2021 Giller Prize. Plett then served on the Giller Prize jury in 2022.

=== On Community ===
Plett published On Community in 2023. It is a short work compiling her thoughts and experiences about community, insisting on the neutrality of community and exploring various questions and definitions in a playful and invitational tone. Laura Sackton, reviewing for Book Riot, praised the book's insights, funny and informal tone, and ability to start a conversation about the subject: "Plett opens the doors to so many rich conversations about what community—in all its iterations—can and cannot do".

== LittlePuss Press ==
Plett and Cat Fitzpatrick founded LittlePuss Press in 2020. Their aim was to create a feminist press to publish authors who wouldn't be published elsewhere, especially supporting trans literature. Their first publication was a reprint of Meanwhile, Elsewhere, the anthology that both women had previously written for Topside Press, which had since disbanded. Since then, they have published works by emerging authors that have won awards like the Stonewall Book Award and Leslie Feinberg Award.

== Awards ==
Work	Awards	Result	Ref.
A Safe Girl to Love	Lambda Literary Award for Transgender Fiction	Won	
A Safe Girl to Love	Dayne Oglivie Prize	Nominated	
Meanwhile, Elsewhere	Stonewall Book Award: Barbara Gittings Literature Award	Won	
Little Fish	Amazon.ca First Novel Award	Won	
Little Fish	Lambda Literary Award for Transgender Fiction	Won	
A Dream of a Woman	Giller Prize	Longlisted	
A Dream of a Woman	Leslie Feinberg Award	Finalist	
On Community	Lambda Literary Award for Transgender Nonfiction	Nominated	
On Community	Leslie Feinberg Award	Finalist	

== Selected works ==
Works by Plett include the following:

- Plett, Casey (2014). A Safe Girl to Love. Topside Press. ISBN 978-1627290050.
- Plett, Casey Plett; Fitzpatrick, Cat, eds. (2017). Meanwhile, Elsewhere: Science Fiction and Fantasy from Transgender Writers. Topside Press. ISBN 978-1627290180.
- Plett, Casey (2018). Little Fish. Arsenal Pulp Press. ISBN 978-1551527208.
- Plett, Casey (2021). A Dream of a Woman. Arsenal Pulp Press. ISBN 978-1551528564.
- Plett, Casey (2023). On Community. Biblioasis. ISBN 978-1771965774.
