= Alexandre Baril =

Canadian academic (born 1979)

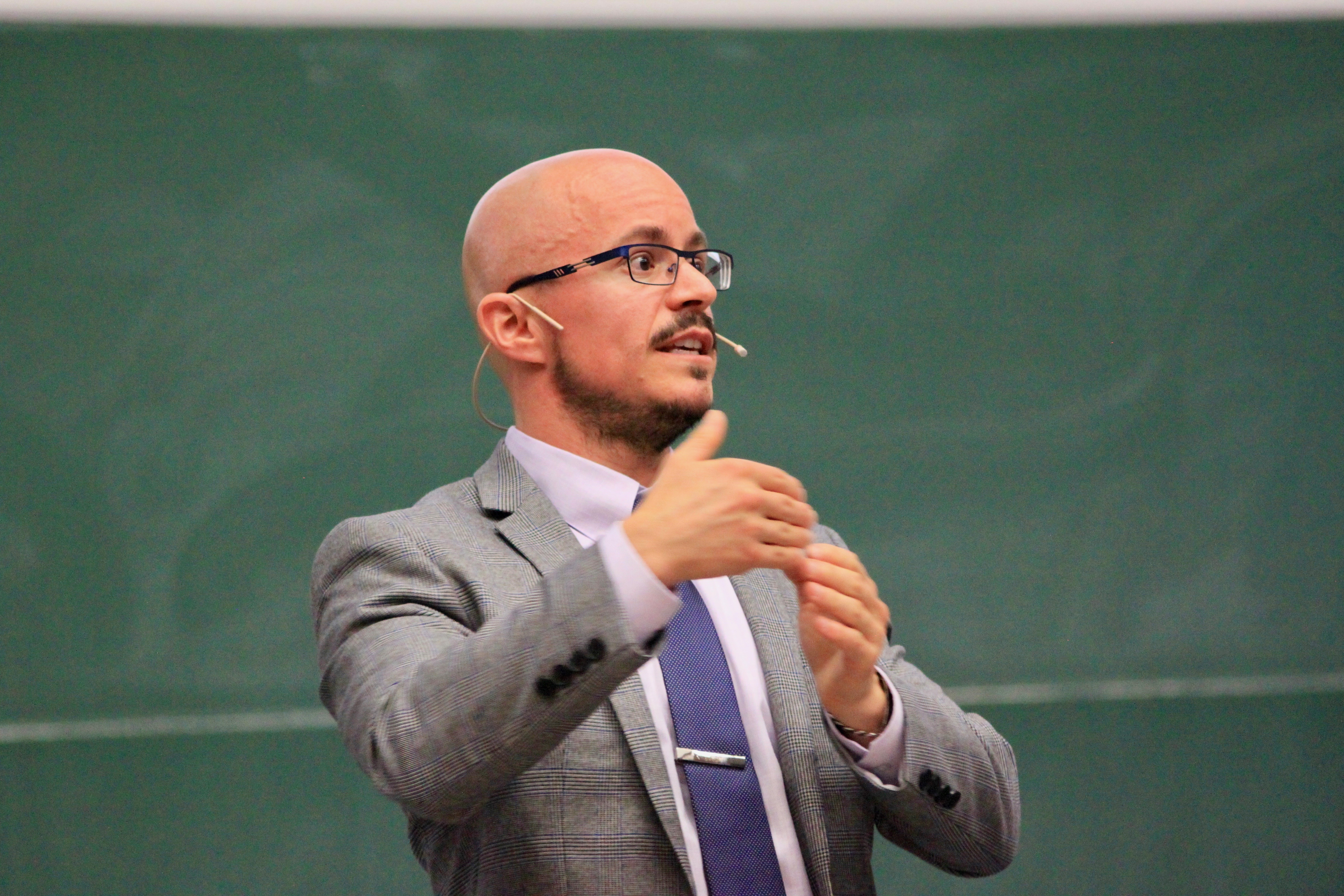
- Born: 1979 (age 46–47); Granby, Quebec, Canada
- Education: University of Ottawa, Université du Québec à Montréal, Université de Sherbrooke
- Notable work: Feminist theory, queer theory, gender studies, (dis)ability studies, feminist and gender studies, sociology of the body, of health and social movements, critical suicidology

Alexandre Baril (born 1979 in Granby, Quebec), is a Canadian researcher and writer and since 2018 an associate professor at the School of Social Work, at the University of Ottawa. His work, carried out from an intersectional perspective, is situated at the crossroads of gender, queer, trans, disability/crip/Mad studies, critical gerontology and critical suicidology. He has also published and researched sexual and gender diversity, bodily diversity ((dis)ability and health), and linguistic diversity.

== Biography ==
Baril attended the Université de Sherbrooke, earning a BA in philosophy with a minor in theology (2000–2003) as well as an MA in philosophy (2003–2005) from the Department of Philosophy and Applied Ethics. He received the highest distinction for his thesis, titled: Judith Butler and Postmodern Feminism: A Theoretical and Conceptual Analysis of a Controversial School of Thought, and has since published many articles on Judith Butler's political philosophy based on this work. After completing his master's degree, Baril pursued a doctoral degree in philosophy (2006–2010) from the Université du Québec à Montréal (UQAM) where he completed all program requirements other than the dissertation. He then went to the University of Ottawa to begin a second doctorate in women's studies (2010–2013) at the Institute of Feminist and Gender Studies. His dissertation, titled: Bodily Normativity Under the Knife: (Re)thinking Intersectionality and Solidarities Between Feminist, Trans, and Disability Studies Through Transsexuality and Transability earned him the highest distinction and the Pierre Laberge prize, awarded to the best dissertation in the humanities.

From 2014 to 2015, he secured a postdoctoral fellowship from the Social Sciences and Humanities Research Council of Canada (SSHRC). He pursued his postdoctoral research in the United-States, at the City University of New York and at Wesleyan University. This research, conducted with sociologist Victoria Pitts-Taylor, focused on the sociology of the body and the sociology of social movements. During this period, Baril also held the position of invited assistant professor at Wesleyan University, teaching courses on issues related to bodily modifications and social movements.

He returned to the University of Ottawa for an appointment as a replacement assistant professor at the Institute of Feminist and Gender Studies In 2015–2016. He taught several courses, including courses on queer and feminist theory in both French and English.

In 2016–2017, he was awarded the Izaak Walton Killam scholarship to pursue his postdoctoral research in political science at Dalhousie University.

Baril accepted the position of assistant professor at the University of Ottawa's School of Social Work In 2018. He was hired to pursue research and teach about intersectionality and diversity, including sexual, gender (trans), bodily (disability), and linguistic diversity. This appointment was a historic moment for trans people and trans studies in Canada. Baril was the first Francophone trans person in Canadian history to be employed as a professor specializing in trans studies to teach on sexual and gender diversity in French.

== Career ==
Baril is an activist and public speaker for the rights of trans people, people living with disabilities, and those with suicidal thoughts. In media interviews, Baril has described the violence and discrimination experienced by trans and marginalized people. He denounces the social inequalities endured by these communities and shares solutions to put an end to them.

The French-language neologisms he has translatied, coined and used (cisnormativité, cisgenrenormativité, transcapacité, suicidisme, etc.) represent contributions to many fields of study, including trans, gender, and (dis)ability studies, as well as critical suicidology. More specifically, Baril translated and was one of the first scholars to use terms such as cisgenderism, cissexism, cis privilege, and transfeminism in French. He is credited by several scholars for having coined and conceptualized the term "transitude", inspired by (but different from) the notion of "transness" in English.

== Awards ==
In December 2017, Baril was awarded the title of Personality of the Week by Radio-Canada (Canadian Broadcasting Corporation) for his involvement in the media after being hired by the University of Ottawa. As is mentioned in several interviews and articles, Baril is the first trans person to be hired by a Canadian university to teach gender and sexual diversity in French.

In 2011, Baril received the Lana St-Cyr Award from the Aide aux transsexuels et transsexuelles du Québec (ATQ) in recognition of the major role he played in organizing the first trans protest in Quebec history on June 17, 2010, in Montreal. At the time, Baril was involved in PolitiQ-queer solidaire, an activist group fighting against all forms of heterosexist and cissexist oppression and exclusion in Quebec. Nearly 200 people gathered for the 2010 demonstration, which included community organizations advocating for the rights of trans people and leading public figures from legal, academic, and political sectors. The protesters demanded changes be made to Quebec's existing regulations requiring those seeking gender marker changes to their civil status to undergo forced sterilization, as well as more accessible ways of changing one's name.

Moreover, Baril has been awarded several other research awards such as the Francophone CDSA-ACEH (Canadian Disability Studies Association) Tanis Doe Award for Canadian Disability Study and Culture (2020) and the Equity, Diversity and Inclusion President’s Award at the University of Ottawa (2021). His most recent book, JSTOR jj.5104041 "Undoing Suicidism: A Trans, Queer, Crip Approach to Rethinking (Assisted) Suicide"] has won two awards, the International Association of Autoethnography and Narrative Inquiry’s Outstanding Book Award (Honorable Mention) (2024) and the International Congress of Qualitative Inquiry (ICQI) Qualitative Book Award (2025).

In 2025, Baril was awarded the King Charles III Coronation Medal for his contributions to Canada through his academic research and his service to marginalized groups in Canada.

== Research ==
Baril is described as one of the first trans researchers in Canada to publish work on trans issues from a transactivist perspective in the French language. His first article on trans issues, published in 2009, is titled: Transsexualité et privilèges masculins : fiction ou réalité? (Transsexuality and Male Privilege: Fact or Fiction?). Nonetheless, obtaining his doctorate and over the span of his career thus far, Baril's research interests have expanded and he has published on a variety of topics such as disability, trans issues, queer theory, dementia and aging, and more recently, suicide. He is particularly known for having developed and translated (to French) concepts that theorize and address forms of injustice and oppression experienced by marginalized groups (disabled folks, trans folks, 2SLGBTQI+ folks, suicidal folks, etc.). His conceptual contributions are further defined and detailed in the sections below.

Moreover, while Canadian researchers had already been publishing on trans issues before Baril, this work was done by Anglophones. Examples of these trans researchers, working in Canadian English-language universities, include: Jin Haritaworn, Aaron Devor, Dan Irving, Trish Salah, Bobby Noble and Viviane Namaste. It is worth noting that trans studies are generally under-theorized in french-language academia; indeed, as Marie-Christine Williams-Plouffe writes "while the issue of sexual diversity (sexual orientation) is discussed more frequently—albeit limited to gay and lesbian experiences—gender diversity (gender identity) remains largelyinvisible and is sometimes still pathologized". Baril's work has been described as pioneering in francophone trans studies by several scholars, one of the first to theorize the specific realities of trans francophones and to use/coin neologisms to name these distinct realities. For example, in a recent article, Georgie Gagné expresses that her article is "a contribution to the dialogues initiated by Alexandre Baril’s work, which addresses the silence surrounding trans issues in French-Canadian feminist spaces" . In an article on francophone disability studies, Laurence Parent details the importance of Baril's contribution to the fields on disability studies, Queer studies and trans studies by way of theorization and translation. She indeed writes, "An interesting aspect of Baril’s thesis is the emphasis placed on translating concepts that have thus far been theorized primarily in English. French translations used to describe concepts emerging from the fields of study and social movements related to transgender, transsexual, and (trans) disability issues are included in an analytical glossary at the end of his thesis. Some of the terms are entirely new. This glossary clearly illustrates the necessity and relevance of demonstrating creativity and openness in order to uncover ideas that are too often overlooked in French-language research." Other prominent scholars that have contributed to francophone scholarship in the area of trans issues are Line Chamberland, the research chair on homophobia, and Annie Pullen Sansfaçon, co-founder of Gender Creative Kids Canada (Enfants transgenres Canada) and professor at the Université de Montréal. However, these researchers do not identify as transgender themselves, unlike Baril.

=== Cisnormativité / cisgenrenormativité (cisnormativity / cisgendernormativity) ===
Inspired by the concept of heteronormativity, cis (gender) normativity can be defined as "the normative dimension of the dominant cisgenderist system, which understands people who identify with the gender and sex assigned to them at birth as more normal than those people who decide to live as another gender and/or transition." This dominant normative system promotes negative judgments, discrimination, and violence towards trans people while erasing their experiences and realities. The concept of cisgendernormativity is a neologism created by Baril that refers to the specific normativity of cisgender and cissexual identities. It is, therefore, a reference to a cis normativity tied to one's gender.

Baril is the first person to create and define the notions of cisnormativity and cisgendernormativity and he did so in French in his 2009 article, on male privilege. He expands on these notions in his 2013 thesis. His article and that of Bauer et al.—"I Don't Think This Is Theoretical; This Is Our Lives: How Erasure Impacts Health Care for Transgender People" (2009)—the first to define the concept of cisnormativity in English, were published simultaneously. As such, Bauer et al. and Baril are both credited with proposing cisnormativity/cisgendernormativity.

=== Transféminisme (transfeminism) ===
Transfeminism is a "theoretical and political collaboration between feminist and trans studies". This feminist movement seeks to be more inclusive, taking up the multiple, diverse experiences of women into consideration, including those of transgender men and women. Transfeminism advocates for bodily autonomy, challenging patriarchal structures by fighting against sexism by incorporating trans and queer perspectives to deconstruct gendered norms.

Inspired by scholar and activist, Emi Koyama's work on transfeminism, Baril was the first scholar in French-speaking academia to adopt transfeminism as an approach in 2009, to analyze male privilege in trans men.

=== Transcapacitaire (Transabled) ===
The term "transabled" refers to a non-disabled person's need to transform their body to acquire a disability. Moreover, these people maintain that this experience should not simply be understood as a decision or 'choice,' but rather as a need" to modify various physical abilities that are not necessarily limited to amputations. Transabled is derived from the word "able" which "refers to various abilities: physical, mental, psychological, etc. that are not assigned the positive or negative values associated with other terms such as capable/incapable, validity, etc., and denotes the presence or absence of ability." It's also important to note that the term deviates from medical and psychological models that favour the language of apotemnophilia and Body integrity dysphoria (BIID).

Baril did not coin the term transabled in English; transabled activists did. He coined the terms “transcapacitaire” and “transcapacité” in French and adapted "transabled" and "trainability" to the French-speaking context. Baril coined these terms during his doctoral studies once he became aware of the absence of work on the realities of people with disabilities in intersectional feminist analyses. His goal was to understand the development of "expository discourses (etiology and suggested treatment methods) surrounding traceability, and the effects of such discourses on the reception (positive or negative) of transabled testimonials." Faced with the absence of respectful vocabulary in the French language, Baril chose to create new terminology to avoid using the existing terms, whose negative connotations can undermine the realities of these individuals.

=== Transitude (transness) ===
Transitude refers to the condition of—or the state of being—trans. This neologism first appeared in blogs in 2013, without being defined, and then in Baril's research in 2014–2015. Baril initially coined the term in 2014 for a scientific presentation in 2015.Cartoonist Sophie Labelle used the term in 2015, for her webcomic Assignée garçon (titled Assigned Male in English).

This neologism is inspired by the English term, "transness". Baril explains, "the French neologism 'transitude' is equivalent to 'transness' in English. Composed of the term 'trans' and the suffix '-itude,' which denotes a state, transitude refers to the state of being trans."

=== Suicidisme (suicidism) ===
Baril coined the concept "suicidism" in 2016–2017 to describe "a system of oppression (founded on non-suicidal perspectives) encompassing normative, discursive, medical, legal, social, political, economic, and epistemic structures in which suicidal individuals experience multiple forms of injustice and violence."

In the fields of suicidology and critical suicidology, Baril is recognized as the first to theorize the oppression of suicidal people from an intersectional, anti-ableist, and anti-sanist perspective. His work, and notably, his 2023 book on the matter has been widely praised and reviewed by dozens of scholars. Notably, social work researcher Juergen Dankwort writes, "There is no doubt that Alexandre Baril has upended prevailing approaches in suicide prevention. (...) His contribution to the field of suicidality is profound and gives pause to notions that people must necessarily be deterred from attempting the act at all costs". Scholar Jeffrey Ansloos adds that "Baril’s (2023) work on suicidism is undoubtably one the most significant pieces of theorizing on suicide of the last century (...)". Finally, David Guignon asserts that "Alexandre Baril’s Undoing Suicidism is a necessary intervention and corrective to the study of suicide. His approach is nothing short of radical in its interrogation of the foundational assumptions that have guided critical perspectives on suicide for more than 100 years when sociologists began studying it".

Baril's suicidism framework borrows from Robert McRuer’s crip theory (2006) as well as from critical disability studies to "interpret suicidal thoughts and gestures" and creates what he calls the "socio-subjective model of disability." He maintains that suicidal individuals should be able to speak freely about their thoughts, not just for the sake of enriching approaches to suicide prevention, but also to assist, using a harm reduction approach, those suicidal individuals who are determined to die by suicide when their need to die is profound and stable. This is a view that is rejected by the suicide prevention community and by the disability rights community generally, which tends to oppose physician assisted suicide.

In 2023, Baril expanded on this concept of suicidism in his book JSTOR jj.5104041 "Undoing Suicidism: A Trans, Queer, Crip Approach to Rethinking (Assisted) Suicide"]. Pulling from queer, trans, crip, and Mad studies, Baril challenges dominant perspectives on suicide and the injunction to live, and suggests further analysis of the multiple and interlocking social systems that promote "compulsory aliveness", and subsequently harm against suicidal individuals. According to Baril, suicidal individuals are left out of the intersectional analyses of social movements and those anti-oppression movements reproduce the oppression they experience through paternalistic, ableist, and sanist discourses. Suicidism indeed manifests itself through epistemic violence, silencing and self-silencing, through which suicidal people are not only often dismissed as "knowers" of their own realities, but also learn to hide their suicidal thoughts and echo the dominant "suicidist preventionist script". This script is reflected in the majority of suicide prevention services which solely aim to save lives, engaging in coercive and stigmatizing intervention approaches towards suicidal people. For example, when people at risk of suicide call for help and express suicidal thoughts, they are often subjected to inhumane treatment, such as violent police interventions, forced hospitalizations or interventions, job loss, and the administration of medication against their will. The confidentiality of calls to helplines is often compromised by call tracing and non-consensual police intervention, leading to disclosures and negative social consequences.

Regarding LGBTQ+ suicidality, Baril argues that current approaches to prevention within this community often rely on surveillance and coercion, which perpetuates suicidist oppression, especially for those with numerous marginalised identities. Instead, he advocates for a transing and queering approach to suicide, that considers how preventionism reinforces all "-isms", and rather prioritises consent and self-determination. Additionally, he discusses how current understandings of suicide, and even legislation around assisted suicide, reproduce sanism and ableism. He rather endorses a cripping and maddening of suicidality to centre the perspectives of disabled/Mad communities. Moreover, Baril makes the radical argument that a suicide-affirmative approach within a positive-rights framework could reduce the number of suicides by allowing suicidal individuals to freely discuss their suicidality without a fear of non-consensual and coercive interventions.

Baril's book on suicidism has been translated in French by Éditions de la Rue Dorion (Défaire le suicidisme : une approche trans, queer, et crip du suicide (assisté) in 2025 and adapted to a (francophone) european audience by Éditions Burn~Août in 2026.

=== Rethinking consent through intimate images of trans people in the media ===
Baril is interested in how the media overexploits trans issues without considering the potential consequences for—or the well-being of—the communities involved. He studies the objectification and sexualization of trans bodies in the media. In his work, he advocates for the development of an ethical approach to critically reflect on the possible consequences that media representations focused on the intimate lives of trans people can have. In one of his articles, he suggests we "initiate a conversation with media professionals and encourage the development of complex ethical approaches regarding the consent of marginalized groups, including trans* people, to the public distribution of intimate images."

== Publications ==
- Alexandre Baril "Undoing Suicidism: A Trans, Queer, Crip Approach to Rethinking (Assisted) Suicide", 2023
- Alexandre Baril and Marjorie Silverman, Forgotten lives: Trans older adults living with dementia at the intersection of cisgenderism, ableism/cogniticism and ageism, Sexualities, 2019.
- Alexandre Baril, Gender IdentIty Trouble: An Analysis of the Underrepresentation of Trans* Professors in Canadian Universities, Chiasma, no. 5, 2019, p. 90-128.
- Alexandre Baril, Confessing Society, Confessing Cis-tem: Rethinking Consent Through Intimate Images of Trans* People in the Media, Frontiers: A Journal of Women Studies, 39, 2, 2018, p. 1-25.
- Alexandre Baril, The Somatechnologies of Canada’s Medical Assistance in Dying Law: LGBTQ Discourses on Suicide and the Injunction to Live, Somatechnics, 7, 2, 2017, p. 201-217.
- Alexandre Baril, Intersectionality, Lost in Translation? (Re)thinking Inter-sections Between Anglophone and Francophone Intersectionality, Atlantis: Critical Studies in Gender, Culture & Social Justice, 38, 1, 2017, p. 125-137.
- Alexandre Baril, “Doctor, Am I an Anglophone Trapped in a Francophone Body?” An Intersectional Analysis of Trans-crip-t Time in Ableist, Cisnormative, Anglonormative Societies, Journal of Literary & Cultural Disability Studies, 10, 2, 2016, p. 155-172.
- Alexandre Baril, Francophone Trans/Feminisms: Absence, Silence, Emergence, TSQ: Transgender Studies Quarterly, 3, 1/2, 2016, p. 40-47.
- Alexandre Baril, “How Dare You Pretend to Be Disabled?” The Discounting of Transabled People and their Claims in Disability Movements and Studies, Disability & Society, 30, 5, 2015, p. 689-703.
- Alexandre Baril, Needing to Acquire a Physical Impairment/Disability: Re)thinking the Connections Between Trans and Disability Studies Through Transability, Hypatia: Journal of Feminist Philosophy, 30, 1, 2015, p. 30-48.
- Alexandre Baril, Transness as Debility: Rethinking Intersections Between Trans and Disabled Embodiments, Feminist Review, 111, 2015, p. 59-74.
- Alexandre Baril and K. Trevenen, Exploring Ableism and Cisnormativity in the Conceptualization of Identity and Sexuality “Disorders”, Annual Review of Critical Psychology, 11, 2014, p. 389-416.
