= Disability and LGBTQ people =

Disability and LGBTQ+ identity can both play significant roles in the life of an individual. Disability and sexuality can often intersect, for many people being both disabled and LGBTQ+ can result in double marginalization. The two identities, either by themselves or in tandem, can complicate questions of discrimination (in workplaces, schools, or otherwise) and can affect access to resources such as accommodations, support groups, and elder care.

LGBTQ+ identity and its relationship to disability has also been analyzed by academics. LGBTQ+ identities have been pathologized as mental disorders by some groups, both historically and in the present. Alternatively, some activists, scholars, and researchers have suggested that under the social model of disability, society's failures to accommodate and include LGBTQ+ people makes such an identity function as a disability.

== Rates of disability ==
In general, studies have found that LGBTQ+ populations report higher rates of disability than the general population.

In studies looking at populations in the United States, LGBTQ populations report higher rates of disability compared to the heterosexual and cisgender majorities. According to the Movement Advance Project in 2019, an estimated 3 to 5 million lesbian, gay, bisexual and transgender people in the United States have a disability. A 2022 report about the United States by the Human Rights Campaign reported that 36% of LGBTQ+ adults have self reported having a disability while 24% of non-LGBTQ adults self reported having a disability. A 2024 report on American LGBTQ youth found that 29.7% of the 3,100 youth polled were diagnosed with a disability, with these numbers being higher for trans youth (33.3%) than cisgender LGBQ+ youth (20.6%).

In a 2020 study of Australian LGBTQ people, 38% of respondents reported having at least one disability.

In a 2022 study of Canadians with disabilities, 8.7% of the disabled population also identified as 2S (two-spirit) or LGBTQ+. The same study found that "the 2SLGBTQ+ population with disabilities is younger than the non-2SLGBTQ+ population with disabilities". Of the 2SLGBTQ+ population with disabilities, the majority (69.9%) reported a disability related to mental health.

In China, a rough estimate of cantong, or LGBTQ people with disabilities, is about 5 million people.

== Academic theory ==
Academic research on disability and LGBTQ identities examines how social norms around ability, sexuality, and gender shape an individual's understanding of communities and practices. Disability studies emerged in the late 20th century as an academic discipline with critiques of early scholarly approaches to physical and cognitive variation in humans. Similar to the academic discipline of disability, queer theory has risen in popularity due to the shared critique of normative ideals of social performance including the negligence of gender specific medical research.

Intersectional approaches to the two fields were brought to fruition with academic coverage of historical events such as the eugenics movement in the U.S. that sterilized disabled individuals, the commodified display of queer and disabled individuals within Freak shows, and the Holocaust in Germany that led to the genocide of disabled and homosexual people.

Notable scholars in the field such as Eli Clare, Alison Kafer, and Robert McRuer drew inspiration from the early works of Michel Foucault in The History of Sexuality and women of color's memoirs regarding the body, such as Audre Lorde's The Cancer Journals.

Approaches in disability studies and queer theory draw on the shared and nuanced experiences on estranged family relationships, identity-based violence, structural and social exclusion. Both fields have debated the benefits and limitations on assimilation versus liberation, noted as the "mythical norm" in Audre Lorde's Sister Outsider: Essays and Speeches.

=== Eli Clare ===
==== Exile and Pride: Disability, Queerness, and Liberation (1999) ====
This book has been deemed as one of the earliest literary works of intersecting disability studies and queer theory. The autobiography entails Clare's multi-layered experiences throughout his life as a transgender disabled man; from being born with cerebral palsy to being sexually abused by his father, challenging his school district to let him be in regular classes despite being "universally assumed to be 'mentally retarded.'" Clare analyzes the contradicting forces of having a feminine body while their "internal sense of gender is as a genderqueer" including his own internalized "freakdom" of labels and identities others have used with intent to isolate him. He analyzes how disability and sexuality intersect but differ in their forms of objectification:

"In our search for liberation, we can sometimes turn the language and symbols more closely reflecting our oppression into powerful expression on pride." (Clare, 1999)

==== Material Ecocriticism: Meditations on Natural Worlds, Disabled Bodies, and a Politics of Cure (2014) ====
In this chapter, Clare examines the relationship between nature and societal concepts. He derives a concept called the "politics of cure" as a narrative of thinking within interdisciplinary studies to enact a consciousness that separates nature from disabled people. He compares the medical model of disability to the politics of cure; criticizing the need for restoration:

"A simple one-to-one correspondence between ecological restoration and bodily restoration reveals cure's mandate of returning damaged bodies to some former, and none disabled, state of being." (Clare, 2014)

=== Robert McRuer ===
==== Crip Theory: Cultural Signs of Queerness and Disability (2006) ====
Many consider this work foundational in the queer, disability, and critical studies field for his development of crip theory that draws on works from Adrienne Rich including compulsory able-bodiedness. Similar to queer theory, the new concept is also developed outside of binary categories but also depends on it for its existence.

Instead of seeing abled and disabled as polar opposites, McRuer uses crip theory to highlight assumptions of ableism where disabled people will always choose to not be disabled and where non-disabled people fear the day they become disabled.

"...it's clear that we're inescapably haunted by the disability to come. And by the disability to come, the one we invoke, has often been frightening..." (McRuer, 2006)

==== Special Issue of GLQ "Desiring Disability" Co-edited with Abby Wilkerson (2003) ====
In 2003, Robert McRuer and Abby Wilkerson co-edited a Special Issue of GLQ entitled "Desiring disability: queer theory meets disability studies" and introduced a form of radical thinking that deconstructs dominant norms to create space for "desiring disability".

Sex and Disability Co-edited with Anna Mallow (2012)

Following November 11, 2001, media coverage about inaccessibility to handicap emergency exits for disabled workers trapped in the Twin Towers.

Both authors note the shift in cultural publications about disability and sex, recent authors inspired by Anne Finger's works in the late twentieth century. They question what can happen if sex and disability are politicized through sections throughout the book: access, histories, spaces, lives, and desires all enveloped through a collection of essays. They consider the similarities and contradictions within this intersection, stating that the book

"has the potential to transform sex, creating confusions about what and who is sexy and sexualizable, what counts as sex, what desire 'is'."

— McRuer & Mollow, 2012

==== Compulsory Able-Bodiedness and Queer/Disabled Existence (2017) ====
McRuer used Adrienne Rich's idea of compulsory heterosexuality to examine how society might also perpetuate "compulsory able-bodiness". He recalls on the term normalcy, previously analyzed historically by Lennard Davis, to show how performances of able-bodiedness and heterosexuality are connected. Their repetitive actions connect to Judith Butler's theory of gender performativity for the social categories that created them including the impossible expectations connected to them. In a disability context, McRuer renamed Gender Trouble as "ability trouble," as disabled individuals are considered queer in their assumed asexual identity and queer individuals seen as disabled through the pathologization of their sexuality in the DSM. Robert concludes the chapter by urging the reader to think of queer and disabled bodies as otherwise than in hegemonic categories.

=== Alison Kafer ===
Feminist theorist Alison Kafer has been cited as a foundational researcher in queer-disability studies for her publication Feminist, Queer, and Crip.

==== Feminist, Queer, Crip (2013) ====
Kafer reimagines the social model of disability, which was developed in the 1970s by disability rights activists. She critiques the rigid categories of only considering social accessibility and not the chronic pain individuals face that can’t be fixed by only accommodation, further vilifying them for seeking medical intervention to lessen their symptoms.

"...the social model can marginalize those disabled people who are interested in medical interventions or cures...[in] other words, because we are so often confronted with the medical framing of disability as unending burden, or as a permanent drag on one's quality of life, disability rights activists and scholars tend to deny our own feelings of pain or depression; admitting to struggling with our impairments or to wanting a cure for them is seen as accepting the very framings we are fighting against..." (Kaefer, 2013)

Kafer considers another concept, crip time, influenced by Robert McRuer's Crip Theory. She wants to counter the normative concept of time to question what defines an appropriate amount of time for someone to arrive based on a level of able-bodiedness. She further connects crip and queer futurity to Donna Haraway's cyborg theory. Kafer states that it "could encompass everyone from people with learning disabilities to those with chronic illness, from people with mobility impairments to those with HIV/AIDS, from people with sensory impairments to those with mental illness". (Kafer, 2013)

Many consider Kafer's "engagement with the intersections of gender and cripping time [has never been] stronger than in the instances where she makes explicit the mainstream responses to gendered disability narratives". Others critique the exclusive focus on Westernized ideals of disability, pushing for a more global reach to encompass disability studies inclusively.

=== Other Scholars ===
Other notable scholars include Sami Schalk who writes about disability studies at the intersection of queerness and Blackness, Jina Kim who connects sexuality and disability to neoliberal structures of care, and Karen Nakamura, a UC Berkeley anthropologist who writes about disability, sexuality, and social movements in Japan. These scholars have expanded foundational scholarship to further expand the discipline. GLQ Volume 9, Issue 1: Cripping the (Queer) Nation. Following November 11, 2001, media coverage about inaccessibility to handicap emergency exits for disabled workers trapped in the Twin Towers; Robert McRuer and Abby Wilkerson introduce a form of radical thinking that deconstructs dominant norms to create space for "desiring disability".

== History ==
Until 1990, the World Health Organization classified homosexuality as a mental disorder. In 2019, the organization also removed "gender identity disorder", referring to transgender people, from the International Statistical Classification of Diseases and Related Health Problems.

=== United States ===
Street Transvestite Action Revolutionaries (STAR), a group founded by Marsha P. Johnson and Sylvia Rivera, worked both to support trans and gay people and disabled people. STAR called for the end of non-consensual psychiatric incarcerations of LGBTQ+ individuals, something Johnson had experienced in her life.

Other activists in the United States involved in both the gay rights and the disability rights movements include Kenny Fries, Barbara Jordan, and Connie Panzarino.

In the late 1970s, disabled attendees and groups were recorded at San Francisco Pride.

In the 1980s and early 1990s, the case of Sharon Kowalski was taken up by both disability and gay rights activists. Kowalski, a lesbian, had become disabled after a car accident, and her father had been awarded custody of her. Her father then moved Kowalski to a nursing home five hours away from her partner, Karen Thompson, and prevented Thompson from visiting Kowalski. In a victory for both groups of activists, the Minnesota Court of Appeals ruled that Thompson be made Kowalski's legal guardian, in line with Kowalski's wishes.

Disability Pride Month was founded in 1990, inspired by both gay and Black pride.

In June 2014, the White House hosted a panel on LGBT issues and disability.

==== Medical care ====
Until 1973, homosexuality was included in the Diagnostic and Statistical Manual of Mental Disorders. Although many gay liberation activists celebrated its removal, others were blase or wary about aligning the wider community with psychiatric associations or providers. Before its removal, both anti-psychiatric and gay liberation activists had used homosexuality's inclusion in the DSM as leverage to criticize psychiatry as a whole.

In the late 1970s, Bobbie Lea Bennett became the first trans woman to have her gender-affirming surgery covered by Medicare. Bennett, as a wheelchair user with osteogenesis imperfecta, was already covered by the policy, which forced the courts to decide whether the surgery was considered a "legitimate medical treatment"; up until this point, transgender activists trying to have their surgeries covered under the policy had to argue that being transgender, in and of itself, was a disability.

The Americans with Disabilities Act of 1990 (ADA) made disability a protected class in the United States. However, the law purposefully excluded homosexuality, bisexuality, and "[t]ransvestitism, transsexualism...[and] gender identity disorders not resulting from physical impairments" from the act's definition of disability. This exclusion has led to some cases in which prosecutors have argued that gender dysphoria is a "gender identity disorder" and therefore cannot be accommodated under the ADA. In 1998, Bragdon v. Abbott confirmed that HIV was considered a protected disability under the ADA, which has been used to protect HIV-positive individuals in years since, many of whom are members of the LGBT community.

In 2017, Kate Lynn Blatt became the first trans woman allowed to sue her employer under the ADA for not accommodating her gender dysphoria.

== Challenges ==
LGBTQ+ individuals with disabilities are subject to higher rates of childhood bullying and lack of comprehensive sex education. People who cannot drive or require assistance while traveling may have more limited opportunities to attend LGBTQ+ support groups, community spaces, or events.

Growing literature on sex and disability have highlighted a new form of intimacy called "access intimacy," where accessibility crosses from public into the private domain of an individual's life. Mia Mingus has stated that emotional, physical, intellectual intimacy can nurture and grow when all other needs such as pain management and rest days.

Limited travel opportunities may lead some disabled LGBTQ+ people, especially those living in socially conservative areas, to pursue online or long-distance relationships. LGBTQ+ individuals with disabilities who are assisted by family or caregivers may have more difficulty finding time to be intimate with or have sex with their partners. Those who live in group homes might similarly have difficulties with maintaining privacy within relationships.

== Discrimination ==
=== Medical care ===
In some cases, medical providers or other authorities will use a transgender person's disability status to deny them gender-affirming care, using the argument that the person is not capable enough to give informed consent for such care. Similarly, people may deny LGBTQ+ self-identification on the basis of someone's disability, particularly intellectual disability.

Alternatively, LGBTQ+ individuals may avoid seeking needed medical care, such as STI testing, or accessing disability services because of prejudiced comments or treatment by their healthcare providers. Those who do seek medical care, but do not disclose their identity, may have adverse health consequences when their identity is not taken into account by their physicians.

LGBTQ+ individuals with disabilities that need in-home care may be especially vulnerable, as they may be less likely to have family that can care for them, and nurses or other hired caregivers may make prejudiced or uneducated statements to their patients. Some individuals may choose to change their appearance or behavior so as to appear straight or cisgender to caregivers. For people who are unsure of their sexual or gender identity, caregivers or assistants may be unwilling to discuss the topic with their client.

=== Interpersonal relationships ===
Both LGBTQ+ people and people with disabilities face high rates of sexual assault compared to the general population; for people who are both LGBTQ+ and disabled, the statistics are even higher.

=== Employment ===
Limited opportunities for employment may drive some disabled LGBTQ+ people to remain closeted at work, to avoid being fired. For disabled individuals who are out, their disability and LGBTQ+ identity may further limit job opportunities.

A 2020 study of American lawyers found that nearly 60% of respondents who were both LGBTQ+ and disabled reported having experienced discrimination in the workplace related to their identities.

== Intercommunity issues ==
A common complaint among disabled LGBTQ+ people is that the LGBTQ+ community does not discuss disability, and the disabled community does not discuss LGBTQ+ identities. This is particularly an issue among the LGBTQ+ movements in countries such as China and Nepal.

Within the LGBTQ+ community, accessibility remains an important issue. Not all LGBTQ+ community spaces have accessible buildings or parking, sign language interpretation, Braille signage, or TTY services. LGBTQ+ events, such as Pride events and marches, may have routes which are difficult to navigate for those in wheelchairs or using mobility devices, or spaces that are overwhelming for those with sensory sensitivities. Lectures, gatherings, or film screenings may lack sign language interpretation or closed captions. This may be further complicated by limited budgets that organizations or groups have, leaving little funding to better cater to disabled people.

Ableism more widely is also an issue within the LGBTQ+ community. LGBTQ+ people with disabilities have expressed that a focus in the community on appearance can lead to disabled people feeling excluded or undesirable as partners. Attitudes that disabled people are inherently asexual are also still prevalent.

Within disabled communities, homophobia and transphobia remain as important issues.

== Related organizations ==
Multiple organizations have been founded that specifically aim to serve those in the LGBTQ+ community with disabilities. International organizations include Blind LGBT Pride International.

In the U.S., these include Services & Advocacy for GLBT Elders (SAGE). In the U.K., these include Brownton Abbey, Deaf Rainbow UK, ParaPride, and Regard. In Australia there is Inclusive Rainbow Voices (IRV) and Rainbow Rights & Advocacy.

== In media ==
Disabled LGBTQ+ characters in film and television tend to be rare; a 2021 report by GLAAD found zero such characters in any major American movie releases that year. Their 2022 report found that only 27 characters - 4.5% of all counted LGBTQ+ characters - were also disabled. However, films and television shows featured disabled and LGBTQ+ characters do exist, such as Margarita with a Straw (2014), an Indian film about a bisexual student with cerebral palsy, Queer as Folk (2022), an American series which features a wheelchair-using side character, and Special (2019), an American series about a gay man with cerebral palsy. Such characters have also been included in some children's shows, including The Dragon Prince (2018), which has a recurring Deaf lesbian character, Dead End: Paranormal Park (2022), which has an autistic bisexual protagonist, and The Owl House (2020), where the main character is bisexual and neurodivergent.

Some LGBTQ+ magazines have specifically addressed a disabled audience, such as the magazine Dykes, Disability & Stuff, from Madison, Wisconsin, which was founded in the late 1980s and was published until 2001. More general LGBTQ+ magazines have also addressed disability; lesbian magazine Sinister Wisdom, for example, made "On Disability" the theme of their Winter 1989/1990 issue.

== See also ==
- Sexuality and disability
- Homosexuality and psychology
- Gay men § Disability
- Queer Crips – 2004 anthology edited by Bob Guter and John R. Killacky
- List of LGBTQ medical organizations
- List of LGBTQ Paralympians
- Neuroqueer theory – Framework intersecting neurodiversity and queer theory
