= Brigitte Martel =

Brigitte Martel, (31 October 1949 - 3 June 2006) was a Canadian singer from Québec and one of the first publicly out trans people from that province.

== Biography ==
As a child, Brigitte sang in her mother's Montréal restaurant Le Petit Baluchon. When she was 11, a patron suggested her to go audition for Trans-Canada Disques, where under her birthname Jacques Bélanger, she had a 45 RPM record Maman, tu es la plus belle du monde that made her recognizable. She later recorded a 33 RPM record with songs such as Oh mon papa, Ne fais jamais pleurer ta mère, Bercé par la houle and Granada 2.

Around the age of 20, Brigitte joined a drag revue where she performed under the name Jacqueline Bélair. This experience made her follow a medical transition. By 1972, she became the first Québec public figure to undergo gender affirming surgery, and thus gaining notoriety in tabloid press. She described her transition as an arduous experience, both personally and professionally:

If you go back to the 1970s, people weren't really ready for that yet. But I told myself, "I’m taking the plunge—come what may!" As the years went by, things settled down, and eventually, people came to accept me.

— Mirha-Soleil Ross, Journée internationale de la transsexualité, Brigitte Martel speaking

In 1980, alongside activists such as Marie-Marcelle Godbout, she participated in the inception of ATQ - Association des Transsexuel(le)s du Québec (now Aide aux Trans du Québec), a charitable organization dedicated to individual support and social education regarding trans identities.

In 1981, her autobiography was published by Québecor: Né homme, comment je suis devenu femme (Born a mam, how I became a woman), the first autobiography by a trans person from Québec. In the same year, she also married a man, but a priest disagreed to give a church marriage.

In 1996, she received the Lana St-Cyr Award from the ATQ. In 1997, she performed at the Gala Fierté Trans held at Montréal's Café Cléopâtre, together with performers such as Guilda. She followed with performing in Montréal cabarets under the name Jacqueline Bélanger.

She passed away during the night of June 3, 2006, at her residence in the Laurentides region of Québec. An autopsy revealed that she had died as a result of cardiac arrest.
