= Mirha-Soleil Ross =

Canadian transsexual videographer and activist

- Born: 1969 (age 56–57); Montreal, Quebec, Canada
- Other name: Jeanne B
- Known for: Videography, trans and animal-rights activism

Mirha-Soleil Ross is a transsexual videographer, performance artist, sex worker and activist. Her work since the early 1990s in Montreal and Toronto has focused on transsexual rights, access to resources, advocacy for sex workers and animal rights. She is also known for art produced under the pseudonym Jeanne B.

Her notable works include gendertrash from hell, the Counting Past 2 festival, her show Yapping Out Loud, and the film Mateřština.

== Early life ==
Ross grew up in a poor neighbourhood of Montreal, Quebec. Her family was francophone, worked in construction, and was mostly illiterate. She is Métis. As a teenager during the 1980s, Ross became aware of animal abuse, becoming a vegetarian and getting involved with animal rights activism. She credited this with increasing her awareness of the needs of other marginalized groups, like queer people and sex workers. She struggled to "pass" as a boy and was often attacked for looking too feminine. Ross moved from Montreal to Toronto during the early 1990s, where she did sex work and began producing zines and videos.

== gendertrash from hell and genderpress ==
From 1993 to 1995, Ross and her partner Xanthra Phillippa MacKay published gendertrash from hell, a zine which "[gave] a voice to gender queers, who've been discouraged from speaking out & communicating with each other." They published the zine via genderpress, a company they began in Toronto. Gendertrash was distributed via queer and feminist bookstores, then shared widely among trans people and the queer underground scene, helping form a collective trans culture. In 2025, Ross and Cat Fitzpatrick compiled gendertrash issues and archival materials into a 2025 book, Gendertrash From Hell, published by LittlePuss Press. It has a foreword by Trish Salah and afterword by Leah Tigers.

The original zine included art, poetry, resource lists, serialized fiction, calls to action, classified ads, illustrations, collages and movie reviews. By and for transsexual, transgender and transvestite people, it addressed gender experiences at the individual and societal level and prioritized sex workers, low-income queer people, trans people of colour and prisoners. Articles frequently addressed the erasure of transsexuals from queer communities and the co-opting of trans identities and issues. Ross and MacKay contributed content to the zine, with Ross sometimes writing under the pseudonym Jeanne B. Their company, genderpress, also distributed other trans literature, corresponded with local organizations, and sold buttons.

== Videography ==
Ross' videos, primarily short films, centre on gender, sexuality, animal rights and the transsexual body. Her videos are distributed by Vtape in Toronto. Ross described her filmmaking in her site's biography:

I have always seen my work as activist-oriented and as contributing to changing the terms of the conversations around transsexual issues. In addition, my video making has been motivated by my desire to contribute to the development of a small but radical body of work produced by a handful of transsexual film and video makers internationally. Until 1998, most of my videos were concerned with archiving transsexual histories while challenging audiences – particularly those from the lesbian, gay, and feminist communities – with uncensored and diverse representations of transsexual lives, sexualities, and political struggles [...] My focus has shifted to developing a visual language that articulates the joys and perils of living culturally, sexually, and spiritually in a transsexual body.

Laura Horak lists Ross as an important early trans porn filmmaker, along with artists like Christopher Lee, Stephanie Anne Lloyd, Buck Angel, Morty Diamond, and Cary Cronenwett. Amy Marvin points to Ross and MacKay's film Gender Troublemakers as an important early example of trans-for-trans, or t4t, publishing. Daze Jefferies compares Ross' art to that of Nina Arsenault, saying that each "explore the spatial and spiritual registers of transsexual womanhood". Ross donated her videos and those of her film festival, Counting Past 2, to the Arquives, making her fonds and Rupert Raj's the majority of the trans-related film in that archive. As of 2020, Ross' fonds were also one of the largest collections of trans films in the world.

=== Videos ===
Title	Date	Credits	Length	Summary
Chroniques	1992	Mirha-Soleil Ross	12:00	Clips from Ross' video diary in which she recounts situations where she had unsafe sex with clients.
An Adventure in Tucking with Jeanne B	1993	Mirha-Soleil Ross	5:00	A humorous video that shows Ross attempting to tuck with Scotch tape before meeting a client.
Gendertroublemakers	1993	Mirha-Soleil Ross and Xanthra MacKay	20:00	Ross and MacKay speak frankly with each other about their sexuality and negative experiences with gay men.
I never would have known: A conversation with Peter Dunnigan	1997	Mirha-Soleil Ross	24:00	An interview with Toronto activist and trans man Peter Dunnigan about his transition, sexuality, addiction and recovery.
Dysfunctional	1997	Mirha-Soleil Ross	9:00	A response to society's fascination with and repulsion from transsexual bodies.
Journée Internationale de la Transsexualité	1998	Mirha-Soleil Ross	38:00	A documentary about the trans women's event hosted by l'Association des Transsexuels-les du Québec, featuring, among others, Brigitte Martel.
G-SPrOuT!	2000	Mirha-Soleil Ross and Mark Karbusicky	12:00	"A cyberspace encounter turns into a trans/polysexual vegan-docu-porno featuring urban veggie lovers speaking out on dating, intimacy and sex in a meat-centered culture."
Tales from the Derrière	2000	Mirha-Soleil Ross	24:51	A video of Ross' 1999 performance of the same name which featured stories from her work and stories about her anus.
Tremblement de Chair	2001	Mirha-Soleil Ross and Mark Karbusicky	3:40	A meditation on sexuality in a trans woman's body.
Madame Lauraine's Transsexual Touch	2001	Mirha-Soleil Ross, Viviane Namaste and Monica Forrester	34:00	A film on safer sex between transsexual sex workers and their clients.
Lullaby	2001	Mirha-Soleil Ross	4:00	A video produced as part of Ross' performance art piece where she simulated pregnancy for 9 months.
Yapping Out Loud: Contagious Thoughts from an Unrepentant Whore	2002	Mirha-Soleil Ross and Mark Karbusicky	74:00	A film of Ross' one-woman show by the same name.
Proud Lives	2002	Mirha-Soleil Ross and Mark Karbusicky	5:00	Film footage of Ross as the grand marshal of the Toronto Pride Parade in 2001.
Allo Performance!	2002	Mirha-Soleil Ross and Mark Karbusicky	13:00	A video of Ross at the Golden Gate Bridge as part of her performance art piece The Pregnancy Project.
Materstina (Langue Maternelle)	2003	Mirha-Soleil Ross and Mark Karbusicky	11:40	"A Czech woman speaks about her exile in Canada and about her sense of loss as it relates to language and her relationship with her children."
Live eXXXpressions: Sex Workers Stand Up	2006	Mirha-Soleil Ross and Mark Karbusicky	15:00	Footage of Forum XXX, a four-day sex workers' activist event held in Montreal in May 2005.
Brandee aka Lana Lamarre	2007	Mirha-Soleil Ross and Mark Karbusicky	3:00	A memorial video for the performer Brandee, who died in 2007.
Les Vérités Vo(i)lées	2007	Mirha-Soleil Ross	31:45	A look at sex workers' response to the scapegoating of sex workers for the spread of HIV/AIDS and other STIs.

== Counting Past 2 ==
Ross and Xanthra Phillippa MacKay began Counting Past 2 (CP2) in 1997, seeking to make a festival solely dedicated to films and performances by trans artists. They were motivated by the rejection of their film Gender Troublemakers at a gay and lesbian film festival that instead showed works about gender-bending created by cisgender artists. CP2 was the first trans film festival. Later that year, Zachary I. Nataf and Annette Kennerley launched the five-day First International Transgender Film & Video Festival in London. Christopher Lee and Alex Austin also organized Tranny Fest: Transgender and Transgenre Cinema that year in San Francisco, where Ross presented one short film.

In 1997, 1998, and 1999, Ross ran CP2, providing a space for trans people to speak for themselves without catering to cisgender audiences. The festival's goal was to be more inclusive of trans artists than mainstream gay and lesbian film festivals by centering trans voices, accepting less-polished work and including cabaret and performance components instead of restricting submissions to films.

Participants included Aiyyana Maracle and Max Wolf Valerio. In 2002, the festival returned after a two-year hiatus, under the stewardship of Boyd Kodak and Cat Grant. In a 2007 interview with Viviane Namaste, Ross said that her efforts with CP2 to create transsexual spaces outside a lesbian and gay framework had failed and that those spaces had disappeared or been absorbed by the LGBT community. T.L. Cowan named the aesthetics, multi-disciplinary aims, and community-building for marginalized artists as similar between CP2, Edgy Women Festival in Montreal and Hysteria: A Festival of Women in Toronto. Namaste credited CP2 for challenging the autobiographical mode of art that was often the only permitted method for trans people to publish work: "transsexuals have used the opportunity created by CP2 to question the very terms and conditions created by the autobiographical imperative".

== Performance art ==
=== Yapping Out Loud ===
Ross produced a one-woman show, Yapping Out Loud: Contagious Thoughts from an Unrepentant Whore, based on her sex work and activism, at the 2002 Mayworks Festival of Working People and the Arts and in 2004 at the Buddies in Bad Times Theatre. She also performed it at the National Transgender Theatre Festival in New York. The show intended to educate audiences about issues facing sex workers and refute stereotypes contributing to violence against them. Yapping Out Loud also incorporated Ross' animal-rights activism with comparisons between oppression faced by sex workers and coyotes, inspired by the American sex-worker organization COYOTE. COYOTE, standing for Call Off Your Old Tired Ethics, was one of the first advocacy organizations for sex workers rights. Ross had worked as a sex worker for over a decade before creating the show.

Yapping Out Loud was a 7-monologue cabaret that incorporated many characters, including Ross speaking as herself, and styles of performance. Along with her monologues, she projected video of coyotes being hunted in the wild, and music produced by activists for animal rights and rights for sex workers. Throughout, she equated the antitrans and antiprostitute actions of certain feminists with the physical violence frequently committed against prostitutes and trans people. These are especially acted out via the characters of "Bridge It Taylor!", a "feminist-identified-feminist", "Judy Cuty Q", a grad student in "women's sciences", and the "Whore Hunter", a serial killer. Each shares an anti-prostitute mission, from Taylor's quest to "rescue" prostitutes regardless of their own desires, to Judy's television show on "Co-existing with Prostitutes", which shares methods on keeping prostitute's out of viewer's yards, and finally the killer's advice on "whore management" explained by a story of the first time he shot a prostitute.

Ross also delivers four personal monologues speaking in the character of herself. To start the show, she acts out a panic attack caused by being targeted by policing and potential arrest. She then explains how she began sex work, mixing her history with critical analysis and political commentary. Later she explains the humanity and complexity of her clients in contrast to popular characterizations of them. She ends by talking about her experience learning of the Victoria Day 1996 murders of three trans prostitutes in Toronto, one of whom she knew.

In a 2003 interview, Ross discussed her focus on coyotes and COYOTE during the show. She said that a vivid metaphor between the treatment of prostitutes and coyotes had spurred the group's founder, Margot Saint-James, to name the group after the animal. Ross thought the comparison was compelling but also disturbing, in the same way that the characters she portrayed used prostitutes as symbols for their own ends without adequately representing or compensating sex workers. She wanted the show to challenge audiences to reconsider the symbolic use of animals: "How appropriate is it to compare our own human suffering to that of animals when most of the time, quantitatively and qualitatively, there is so much disparity between the two?"

T.L. Cowan classifies Yapping Out Loud as a transfeminist work that takes on the style of the "transfeminist kill/joy", facing up to transphobia and transmisogyny with rage and transformational love, in a similar manner to the "feminist killjoy" defined by Sara Ahmed. Cowan labels Yapping Out Loud as a reparative, educational performance in a similar manner to Ryka Aoki's "To the New World" and Fully Functional Cabaret by Star Amerasu, Aoki, Annie Danger, Red Durkin, Bryn Kelly, and Shawna Virago. Trish Salah also describes Ross' performance as an uncomfortable didactic lesson, challenging viewers to consider the difference between unknown and unknowable things, and "illuminating the privilege and identity stakes investing defensive refusals to know." Salah says Taylor's anti-prostitute feminist monologue "implicates audience members in undoing commonsense understandings of prostitution, transsexuality and so on, from the inside out as it were."

=== Other performances ===
Ross served as grand marshal of Toronto's Pride Parade in 2001, and led animal rights activists in the march to publicize the Animal Liberation Front. They wore coyote masks, referencing COYOTE, and held signs sharing the Animal Liberation Front's successes.

In 2001 and 2002, she performed The Pregnancy Project, a 9-month piece where she appeared in public with a prosthetic belly to spark conversations about gender, motherhood and the possibility of womb transplants for transsexuals.

== Social service ==
During the 1990s and early 2000s, Ross was involved in social service work for trans and sex worker communities in Toronto. In 1999, she was the founding coordinator of Meal-Trans at the 519, a drop-in program offering meals and peer support to trans people. She served vegan meals for Meal-Trans as part of her commitment to animal rights. Ross was involved in the expansion of the 519's trans-related programs, providing services for trans people who are HIV-positive and sex workers as well as founding peer support groups for trans men and trans women with colleague Rupert Raj. They performed similar supportive roles in Toronto as Sandra Laframboise did with the High Risk Project Society at a Native health center in Vancouver.

Ross worked with women's shelters, community centres and sex worker organizations to improve access and educate service providers. She was involved in pushing back against efforts by residents' associations in the Gay Village and Allan Gardens areas to expel sex workers.

Ross hosted Animal Voices, an Ontario radio show covering animal advocacy and liberation movements, from 1996 to 2001. She has spoken against the use of animals as symbolic metaphors for human benefit without people compensating animals in return, sharing the examples of the coyote metaphor for prostitutes, the furry fandom, and the bear subculture for gay men.

Ross was heavily involved in activism and advocacy. After the 1997 murders of two trans people and one cisgender aboriginal woman in Toronto, Ross, Monica Forrester, and several other activists created a community coalition to push for safe spaces for trans people. Forrester recalled that the original coalition included many trans people of color, but when more white organizers and people with targeted training but less understanding of present issues joined the movement, the original activists were pushed out.

Ross' activism consistently pushed the LGBTQ movement to expand its sphere of political support and consider intersectionality. She connected LGBTQ rights with support of sex workers, indigenous communities, and the environment. In an interview published in 2005, Ross criticized the fact that murdered trans women, including sex workers, poor women, and people of color, are often treated as political tools for others, and events like the Trans Day of Remembrance act "both theatrically and politically, to benefit a privileged subsection of the trans community." Ross also criticized the LGBTQ community in a 2003 interview for not noticing or acting against industrial animal exploitation, noting the use of animal experimentation during AIDS research and the leather subculture of the queer community.

Syrus Marcus Ware cites Ross as one of the trans and two-spirited activists of color that helped shape Toronto's trans community during the 1990s and 2000s. He says their contributions have received inadequate recognition and documentation. Other activists named are Yasmeen Persad, Monica Forrester, Nik Redman, Sumaya Dalmar, and Duchess.

== Personal life ==
After Ross moved to Toronto in 1992, she began a relationship and artistic partnership with Xanthra Phillippa MacKay. Ross later was the life partner of activist and film editor Mark Karbusicky, who died in 2007. They produced art together as well.

== Awards ==
Ross has received several grants from the Canada Council for the Arts. Her video Mateřština (co-directed with Mark Karbusicky) won the Marian McMahon Award at the 2004 Images Festival in Toronto. In 2001, Ross was the grand marshal of Toronto's Pride Parade. In 2011, she was inducted into Canada's Q Hall of Fame.

== Exhibitions ==
Exhibition	Dates	Exhibitor	Location
No Master Territories: Feminist Worldmaking and the Moving Image	June 19–August 28, 2022	Haus der Kulturen der Welt	Berlin, Germany
Queering Family Photography	April 21–May 26, 2018	Contact Festival, Stephen Bulger Gallery	Toronto, Canada
The Edgy Women Festival	March 2006	Studio 303	Montreal, Canada
