= Accommodation =

Accommodation may refer to:

- A dwelling
- A place for temporary lodging
- An approach to negotiation and conflict resolution
- Reasonable accommodation, a legal doctrine protecting religious minorities or people with disabilities
- Accommodation (religion), a theological principle linked to divine revelation within the Christian church
- Accommodationism, a judicial interpretation with respect to Church and state issues
- Accommodation bridge, a bridge provided to re-connect private land, separated by a new road or railway
- Accommodation (law), a term used in US contract law
- Accommodation (geology), the space available for sedimentation
- Accommodation (eye), the process by which the eye increases optical power to maintain a clear image (focus) on an object as it draws near
- Accommodation in psychology, the process by which existing mental structures and behaviors are modified to adapt to new experiences according to Jean Piaget, in the learning broader theory of Constructivism
- Accommodations, a technique for education-related disabilities in special education services
- Communication accommodation theory, the process by which people change their language behavior to be more or less similar to that of the people with whom they are interacting
- Accommodation, a linguistics term meaning grammatical acceptance of unstated values as in accommodation of presuppositions
- Biblical accommodation, the adaptation of text from the Bible to signify ideas different from those originally expressed
- PS Accommodation, a pioneer Canadian steamboat built by John Molson

== See also ==
- Accommodationism (disambiguation)
