= Gendertrash from hell =

Canadian transgender publication

gendertrash from hell
- Editor: Mirha-Soleil Ross
- Editor: Xanthra Phillippa MacKay
- Categories: Cultural
- Frequency: Irregular
- Founded: 1993
- First issue: 1993
- Final issue: 1995
- Company: genderpress
- Country: Canada
- Based in: Toronto, Ontario
- Language: English

gendertrash from hell was a zine published in four issues from 1993 to 1995 in Toronto, Canada. Mirha Soleil-Ross and her partner Xanthra Phillippa MacKay produced it from their own press in Toronto to address issues affecting trans people, focusing on intersectional, political art and writing. The zine "[gave] a voice to gender queers, who've been discouraged from speaking out & communicating with each other". Gendertrash was distributed via queer and feminist bookstores, then shared widely among trans people and the queer underground scene, helping form a collective trans culture.

== Background ==
gendertrash from hell was founded by Mirha-Soleil Ross and Xanthra Phillippa MacKay in 1993, and published from their publishing company, genderpress. MacKay, a trans writer and activist, lived in Toronto and Ross, a trans artist and activist, moved there in 1992. The pair began a romantic relationship soon after, and also started to produce art together. In 1993, they created the film Gendertroublemakers, which included interviews with each and footage of their embraces, with a focus on their experiences dating and socializing as trans women.

Also in 1993, Ross and MacKay published the first two issues of gendertrash. Their first issue began with the poem "welcome" by MacKay: "Welcome gender queers / to the world of gender trash / our gender world / where we can give voice / to our concerns in/around/about gender". Ross and MacKay created most of the content themselves, hand-pasting a variety of art forms and writing styles atop a page layout digitally-designed by MacKay. Content was also added by their friends and acquaintances, and later, by readers. The zine's first issue stated that over half of its copies were distributed for free "in order to reach the transsexual community."^{:16} The zine was very popular for trans prisoners in Canada and the U.S. because of its politics and resources, and some articles were written by them as well. Ross and MacKay sent free copies of the zine to trans prisoners who requested it, and traded many letters with them.

Four issues of gendertrash were published, and its run ended in 1995. Ross and MacKay planned to release a fifth issue in August 1995, but stopped when MacKay's health issues worsened. MacKay had previously written about her personal experiences with trans healthcare, epilepsy, and HIV in the poem “Don’t Touch Me—I’m Electric / TS Epileptic".

gendertrash existed during the rise of third-wave feminism, when various other queer and trans zines began, like Homocore, J.D.s, and Diseased Pariah News. TransSisters: The Journal of Transsexual Feminism and In Your Face! were two American trans zines that shared authors and advertisers with gendertrash. gendertrash was one of the first punk trans zines, and bore stylistic resemblances to Diseased Pariah News, Riot Grrrl, and Fuzz Box. gendertrash also used a similarly aggressive, confrontational tone and slurs such as "queer", "fag", "dyke", and "tranny" as punk zines like J.D.s and Queer Tapette/Queer Terrorist.^{:25} While gendertrash was being published, MacKay cited TransSisters and Transsexual News Telegraph as the most similar trans zine contemporaries to her zine, because of their politics and recent origins.^{:21-22}

== Content ==
In standard zine format, gendertrash was a combination of art, poetry, resource lists, serialized fiction, calls to action, classified ads, illustrations, collages and movie reviews. By and for transsexual, transgender and transvestite people, it addressed gender experiences at the individual and societal level and prioritized sex workers, low-income queer people, trans people of colour and prisoners. The zine featured articles expressing trans rage, trans love, and resources by and for trans people. It criticized academia, the medical establishment, and gay and lesbian organizations' treatment and understanding of trans people. The zine also provided coverage and critique of the Camp Trans movement in response to transphobic exclusion at the Michigan Womyn's Music Festival.

Ross provided many interviews with sex workers for the zine, as well as writing articles from her own perspective under the pen name Jeanne B. Kiwi, Vivian Namaste, CaiRa, and Christine Tayleur were among the zine's contributors.

Articles frequently addressed the erasure of transsexuals from queer communities and the co-opting of trans identities and issues. The zine and its authors often explained trans issues via linking trans identity and social class. Articles mostly used "gender described" and "gender queer" instead of "trans", due to the term's origins in medical jargon. The zine also made use of the term "queer" to identity trans people with gay and lesbian people. One piece stated, "We're just as queer as dykes and fags maybe even more so."

== genderpress ==
Mirha-Soleil Ross and Xanthra Phillippa MacKay managed the zine's publisher, genderpress, which also distributed other trans pamphlets and literature, corresponded with local organizations and sold buttons. Button slogans included "Whining Works!!!", "our lives under our control now!", "Gender Outlaw", "Stone Butch", "Transgender Fury", "Self-Organize! Change your sex & your workplace", and "Closets are for Clothes". Many of the buttons address intersectional issues like disability rights activism, anti-racism solidarity, and vegan activism, and many gender identities and sexualities are represented.

== Legacy ==
The Queer Zine Archive Project was the first institution to upload and share gendertrash's first issue online.^{:37} Ross moved to Montreal in 2008 and donated many of her artistic, political, and personal materials to Toronto's ArQuives. These records were indexed by volunteers in 2015, and Ross helped organize and share further work, culminating in the 2017 digital rerelease of gendertrash's four issues.^{:37}

The monikers "gender outlaw" and "gender queer" appeared in gendertrash, and later became popularized, with Kate Bornstein long-credited for coining "gender outlaw", and Riki Wilchins for the single word "genderqueer". gendertrash used variations of both terms earlier but used "gender queer" in a slightly different form, and as an umbrella term for anyone who didn't conform to assigned binary gender roles.^{:37}

Susan Stryker and Talia M. Betcher labeled Sandy Stone's "The Empire Strikes Back: A Posttranssexual Manifesto" as a seminal text in transfeminism. They identified gendertrash as one of the earliest followup works in the field of transfeminist literature, along withTransSisters, Rites of Passage, and Transsexual News Telegraph.^{:30} gendertrash may have also compiled the first list of gender resources and organizations in Canada, sharing verified organizational details in the zine's third issue, mostly focused on Quebec and Ontario, and expanding the list in the zine's fourth issue.^{:34}

Readers of gendertrash that went on to make their own trans zines included Sybil Lamb, with How To Kill Queer Scum, and Anne Tagonist, with Unapologetic: The Journal of Irresponsible Gender.

== Gendertrash from Hell compilation ==
Ross compiled gendertrash materials into a 2025 book published by LittlePuss Press. The book is similarly titled Gendertrash from Hell. Cat Fitzpatrick, co-founder of LittlePuss, helped edit the work, researching archival materials relating to gendertrash that had been stored in boxes in Toronto's ArQuives. She collected scans and various stages of each zine issue, letters and background items concerning the publication, and many draft materials for its unfinished fifth issue.

All four published issues, a fifth unpublished issue, and archival materials were gathered into the book. It has a foreword by Trish Salah and afterword by Leah Tigers. Publishers Weekly labeled the anthology "a remarkable and inspiring record of community-building."

The collection was shortlisted with distinction for The Transfeminine Review's 2025 Reader's Choice Awards for the category of Best Transfeminine Nonfiction. It is also a finalist for the Leslie Feinberg Award for Trans and Gender-Variant Literature.
