= Karen Thompson =

Karen Thompson may refer to:

- Karen Thompson (model), model and actress associated with Playboy
- Karen Thompson (born 1968), American voice actor professionally known as Megan Hollingshead
- Karen Thompson, gay rights campaigner in In re Guardianship of Kowalski
- Karen Thompson (Home and Away), a fictional character from Australian soap opera Home and Away

== See also ==
- Karen Thompson Walker, writer
