= ATQ =

ATQ or atq may refer to:

- Aralle-Tabulahan language, an Austronesian language, ISO 639-3 language code atq)
- Sri Guru Ram Das Ji International Airport, in Punjab, India, IATA airport code ATQ
- Aide aux Trans du Québec, Canadian organization
