= Glib =

Glib may mean a person's comments about a subject that is insincere, shallow or variants that may refer to:

- GLib, a bundle of low-level system libraries written in C
- Gay and Lesbian Information Bureau (GLIB), a defunct bulletin board and website

== See also ==
- glibc, the GNU C Library
- Gnulib, the GNU portability library
