= Debra Soh =

Canadian sex researcher

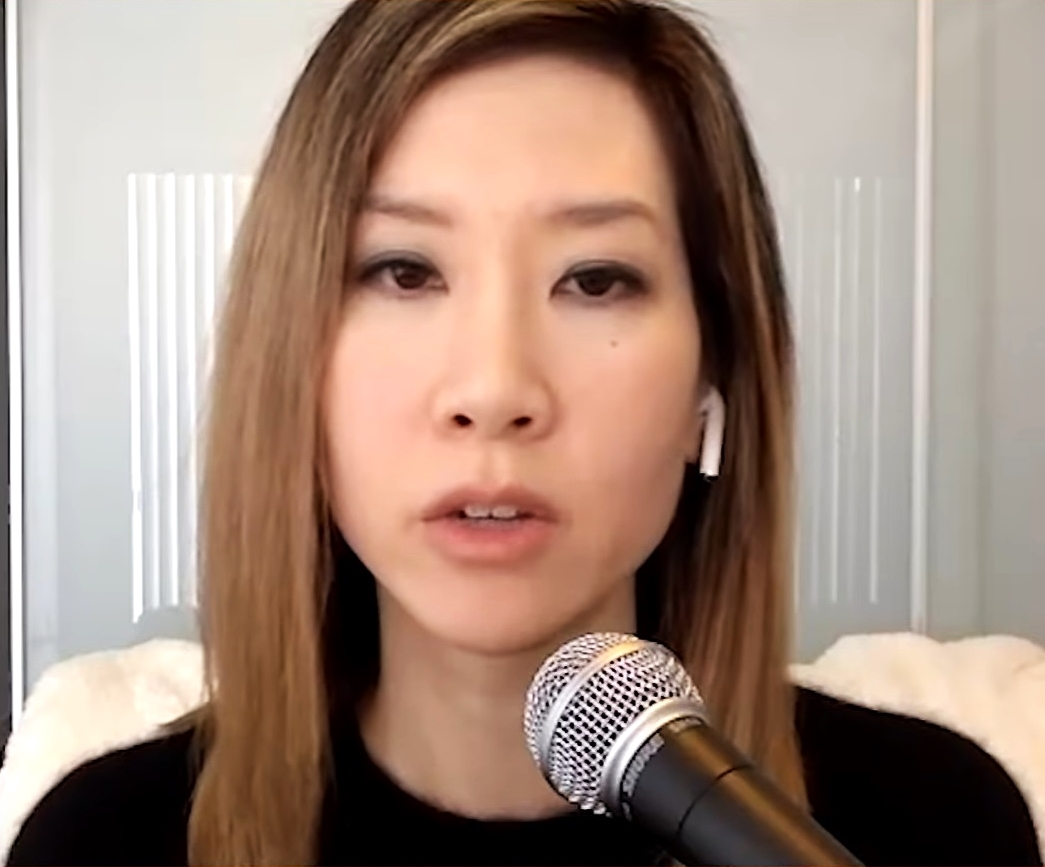
- Soh on Reason TV in 2020
- Born: Debra W. Soh
- Education: Ryerson University (BSc); York University (MSc, PhD)
- Known for: Science columnist; political commentator
- Scientific career
- Thesis: Functional and Structural Neuroimaging of Paraphilic Hypersexuality in Men (2016)
- Doctoral advisor: Keith Schneider
- Website: drdebrasoh.com

Debra W. Soh is a Canadian columnist, author, and former academic sex researcher.

Soh received her Ph.D. from York University in Toronto. She has extensively researched paraphilias, suggesting they are neurological conditions rather than learned behaviors. Soh has written articles for various publications, and she once hosted Quillette's Wrongspeak podcast with Jonathan Kay. She identifies as a former feminist who became disillusioned with the term.

Soh has criticized childhood gender transitions, arguing for waiting until a child reaches cognitive maturity. She has also written against anti-conversion therapy laws that include both sexual orientation and gender identity. In 2020, she published her first book, The End of Gender: Debunking the Myths about Sex and Identity in Our Society.

== Education and research ==
Soh holds a Ph.D. degree in psychology from York University in Toronto. Her dissertation was titled Functional and Structural Neuroimaging of Paraphilic Hypersexuality in Men, and her committee included Keith Schneider of York University and James Cantor of the Centre for Addiction and Mental Health. During her graduate studies, Soh received the Michael Smith Foreign Research Award from the Social Sciences and Humanities Research Council of Canada and York's Provost Dissertation Scholarship.

While at York, she studied paraphilias. Her research indicates that these are neurological conditions rather than learned behaviours.

== Career ==
Soh has written articles for Quillette, The Globe and Mail, New York magazine, Playboy, Los Angeles Times, and The Wall Street Journal. She began hosting Quillette's Wrongspeak podcast with Jonathan Kay in May 2018. Soh describes herself as a former feminist who later became disillusioned with the term.

A 2016 Cosmopolitan article highlighted some of Soh's former research findings and their implications for determining which men are likely to commit rape. A 2015 article she wrote for Salon.com spoke of how she studied a pedophile named Jacob who had come to her office after being arrested for luring what he thought was a 10-year-old minor but was actually an undercover police officer, recommended Germany's Prevention Project Dunkelfeld as a solution, and gave sympathy to Todd Nickerson, who wrote two articles for the same magazine about his experiences as a non-offending pedophile, stating "The backlash that Todd Nickerson faced upon publicly writing about his personal struggle with pedophilia is a reminder that we, as a society, have far to go in challenging the way we think about this emotionally charged subject. But our current approach is not working."

In Soh's 2026 book Sextinction: The Decline of Sex and the Future of Intimacy she stated "The view that nonoffending pedophiles deserve understanding is one I once foolishly supported as a result of my time in academia. It is something that I now deeply regret."

In a 2015 editorial, Soh criticized the prevalence of childhood gender transitions, advising parents and doctors to wait "until a child has reached cognitive maturity." Soh's essay, which referenced gender non-conforming aspects of her own childhood, argued that "a social transition back to one's original gender role can be an emotionally difficult experience." Conservative commentator David A. French characterized this as "an understatement." Soh has also written against anti-conversion therapy laws that include both sexual orientation and gender identity, believing that such laws conflate the two and prevent legitimate therapeutic counselling for individuals with gender dysphoria. Fellow Canadian academics Florence Ashley and Alexandre Baril disputed Soh's interpretation of these studies. Psychologists Kristina Olson and Lily Durwood called Soh's research "alarmist".

Soh opposed the 2015 decision to close Toronto's gender identity clinic, which was known for beginning treatment after or during puberty in most cases. A previous inquiry had put the clinic's chief physician, Kenneth Zucker, at odds with other gender dysphoria specialists who provide support for patients who have not yet gone through puberty. Psychiatrist Jack Turban criticized Soh, stating that hormones are prescribed during puberty according to the Endocrine Society guidelines, adding that "As Soh notes in her article, gender identity is fixed at this time." The following year, Soh wrote an editorial which criticized CBC News for cancelling its airing of a British documentary that featured Zucker.

In 2016, Soh spent a weekend documenting the furry fandom in order to dispel myths about the subculture being primarily sexual in nature. The following year she publicly defended James Damore's "Google's Ideological Echo Chamber" letter, popularly referred to as the Google memo.

In 2018, Soh was described as a member of the "intellectual dark web" by New York Times opinion editor Bari Weiss.

Soh left Wrongspeak at the end of 2018.

In April 2019, Soh supported a lawsuit by Nova Scotia resident Lorne Grabher against the Registrar of Motor Vehicles. The suit was filed to reinstate a licence plate bearing Grabher's last name whose similarity to the phrase "grab her" had made it the subject of a complaint. Soh testified that the plate would not encourage any socially adjusted person to commit a violent act and opined that the government was "overreaching."

On 4 August 2020, Soh published her first book, The End of Gender: Debunking the Myths about Sex and Identity in Our Society.

In 2021, Soh started her own podcast, "The Dr. Debra Soh Podcast". There are 61 episodes and the latest episode aired on February 7th of 2023.

On 10 February 2026, Soh published her second book, "Sextinction: The Decline of Sex and the Future of Intimacy."

In March 2026, Soh appeared on episode #1072 on the podcast Modern Wisdom, hosted by Chris Williamson, where they discussed trends in declining sexual activity and cultural attitudes toward relationships.

== Personal life ==
Soh is of Malaysian-Chinese descent.
