= Dykes, Disability & Stuff =

American magazine

- Cover of the Winter 1988–1989 issue
- First issue: 1988
- Final issue: 2001
- Country: United States
- Language: English

Dykes, Disability & Stuff was a lesbian and disability magazine founded in 1988 in Boston, Massachusetts and published in Madison, Wisconsin. Its publication ended in Fall 2001.

== History ==
Dykes, Disability & Stuff was first published by Catherine Odette, née Lohr, and Sara Karon. It covered inclusivity and disability rights in lesbian spaces and included artwork, reader submissions, articles, poetry, and queer book reviews. It was published irregularly from summer 1988 to fall 2001, releasing 25 issues in total under an annual budget of $6,000. Issues were not released in 1995, 1999, or 2000. Multiple individual quarterly releases were also missed in other years as a result of delays, which "continued to occur for the usual reasons - a combination of health limitations, coupled with a lack of contribution on [their] readers' end." Notably, the annual budget was partially constituted by sponsorships from the Cambridge Women's Center and the National Disabled Women's Educational Equity Project. However, after they moved from Boston, Massachusetts to Madison, Wisconsin in 1991, they lost their Boston sponsor and began to struggle financially. All issues were made available in six alternative formats to assist disabled readers, including standard print, cassette recordings, large text size, and Braille versions. In particular, the Braille edition was transcribed by Ruth Lehrer and the cassettes were voiced by Laura Yaros.

== Content ==
Dykes, Disability & Stuff had a focus on representing and including disabled lesbians. To do this, the magazine showcased reader submissions, letters, artwork, and poetry. Other content included articles about various aspects of queer culture, queer book reviews, and news updates on disabled and queer issues such as the Sharon Kowalski case. It also included advertisements for then-upcoming queer events and other queer magazines, businesses, and publications such as "The Project on Women and Disability", Off Our Backs, and "Blackout"

== Impact ==
Dykes, Disability, and Stuff was considered a major, invaluable resource to historical Lesbian communities. For example, it was considered "a communications network for disabled dykes... to help build a strong lesbian community."

It focused on uplifting and empowering the relatively disconnected disabled lesbian community. In accordance with Odette's beliefs on disability empowerment, the publication called attention to the under-discussed ableism present in lesbian communities everywhere. In a larger context, it drew attention to lesbians who existed outside of the commonly accepted narrative.

Dykes, Disability, and Stuff did not limit its assistance to those who were both disabled and lesbians. It also offered advice to disabled heterosexual women out of a commitment to the disabled community as a whole.
