= Queer Crips =

2004 anthology edited by Bob Guter and John R. Killacky

Queer Crips: Disabled Gay Men and Their Stories
- First edition
- Author: Bob Guter & John R. Killacky (editors)
- Language: English
- Series: Haworth Gay & Lesbian Studies
- Subject: Gay men, Disability
- Genre: Anthology
- Publisher: Harrington Park Press
- Publication date: 2004
- Publication place: United States
- Pages: 225 pp.
- ISBN: 1-560-23456-3
- OCLC: 51117771

Queer Crips: Disabled Gay Men and Their Stories is a 2004 anthology edited by Bob Guter and John R. Killacky. The book is a collection of personal stories from gay men with disabilities. The stories are told through a variety of literary genres, including poetry, prose, and interviews. The book won the 2004 Lambda Literary Award for the Anthologies/Non-fiction category. Contributors to the book include gay men such as Greg Walloch and Kenny Fries. Disability rights activist J. Quinn Brisben was also a contributor. After being turned down for publication by 30 publishers, the anthology was finally published by Harrington Park Press, an imprint of Haworth Press.

== Reception ==
The Disability Studies Quarterly, the publication of the Society for Disability Studies, wrote a review of Queer Crips, stating that:

While Queer Crips can definitely boast of well-crafted, gorgeous poetry, there are a few exceptions. Perhaps it is only a matter of taste, but some of the poetry is of the cathartic type without the "craft" elements of formal published poetry or the spectacle of a performance piece. However, what is great about including such poetry is that it elevates all expressions of feeling and, in a sense, truly captures the sharing of the soul that poetry is.

In the book Crip Theory: Cultural Signs of Queerness and Disability, Robert McRuer notes that the stories in Queer Crips are "nonheteronormative in their broadest sense" and that it is "striking how much the convergence of disability and homosexuality in Queer Crips appears to authorize erotic inventiveness and play". McRuer further writes that the anthology implicitly draws a parallel between compulsory heterosexuality and "compulsory able-bodiedness".

== See also ==
- Crip (disability term)
- Neuroqueer theory
