= Corbett O'Toole =

American disability rights activist

- Born: Boston
- Occupations: Writer, Publicist, Public Speaker and Activist

Corbett O'Toole (born 1951) is a disability rights activist. She had polio as a child. She ran the Disabled Women's Coalition office with Lynn Witt in the 1970s. She worked as a staff member at the Center for Independent Living in Berkeley from 1973 to 1976, and as a staff member for the Disability Rights and Education Fund (DREDF) from 1980 to 1983.

On April 5, 1977, 150 disability rights activists stormed into the federal Department of Health, Education, and Welfare building demanding for the disability community to be included in the 504 section. O'Toole was a participant in the 504 Sit-in, which lasted for twenty-five days, and ended in success. Of the protest, she said, "At that time in history, there was simply no access: no right to an education, no public transit. You couldn't get into a library or city hall, much less a courtroom". In the protest, there were many groups who helped contribute to the success of the Sit-in, such as the Black Panther Party. This organization had provided the disability community free food during their protest, which showed their support for the disability rights movement. O'Toole was able to contribute to the law which provided aid and assistance to the disability community.

In 1980 she established The National Disabled Women's Educational Equity Project in Berkeley, California. Based at DREDF, the Project administered the first national survey on disability and gender and conducted the first national Conference on Disabled Women's Educational Equity held in Bethesda, Maryland.

She organized and helped organize the Disabled Women's Symposium, which preceded the Fourth World Conference on Women in Beijing (1995); the International Conferences on Parents with Disabilities and Their Families (1997; 2002); Funding All Women: Including Women and Girls with Disabilities (1999); and the world's first conference on being Queer and Disabled (2002). She also organized a first-ever briefing for California state legislators on issues of girls and young women with disabilities, in collaboration with the Center for Women Policy Studies (2003).

On December 4, 2003, she received a "Woman of Valor" award from Educational Equity Concepts.

In 2016 her book Fading Scars: My Queer Disability History was nominated in the category of LGBT Nonfiction for the 28th Annual Lambda Literary Awards.

She is openly lesbian and adopted a daughter from Japan.

== Partial bibliography ==
O'Toole, C. J. & Bregante, J. L. (1993). Disabled lesbians. In M. Nagler (Ed.) Perspectives on Disability (2nd ed). Palo Alto, CA: Health Markets Research.

O'Toole, C. J. (1996). Disabled Lesbians: Challenging Monocultural Constructs. In Knotoski, Nosek & Turk (Eds.) Women with Physical Disabilities. London:Paul Brookes Publishing. O'Toole, C. J., & D'aoust, V. (2000). Fit for Motherhood: Towards a Recognition of Multiplicity in Disabled Lesbian Mothers. Disability Studies Quarterly, 20(2), 145–154.

O'Toole, C. & Brown, A. (2003). No Reflection in the Mirror: Challenges for Disabled Lesbians Accessing Mental Health Services. Journal of Lesbian Studies, Vol 7, No. 1, 35–49. [co-indexed as: Mental Health Issues for Sexual Minority Women: Redefining Women's Mental Health. (Ed. Tonda L. Hughes, Carrol Smith, and Alice Dan). Harrington Park Press, an imprint of The Haworth Press, Inc. 2003, pp. 35–49]

O'Toole, C. J. (2002) Report on International Conference on Parents with Disabilities & Their Families. Disability World, Issue no. 16 November–December

O'Toole, C.J. (2002). Sex, disability and motherhood: Access to sexuality for disabled mothers. Disability Studies Quarterly, Fall 2002, 22(4), 81–101.

O'Toole, C.J., Doe, T. (2002). Sexuality and Disabled Parents with Disabled Children. Sexuality and Disability. Spring 2002, 20(1), 89–102.

O'Toole, C.J. (2002). Spotlight Shines on U.S. Women with Disabilities. Issue No. 16. Disability World.

O'Toole, C.J. (2003). The Sexist Inheritance of the Disability Movement. Gendering Disability. Rutgers University Press, NJ. (earlier version)

O'Toole, C. J. (2000). Women: Disabled Women And Independent Living in Brazil, Germany, Great Britain, India, Japan, New Zealand, Nicaragua, Russia, South Africa and Uganda. Disability World, August–September 2000, Issue No. 4

O'Toole, C. J. Fading Scars: My Queer Disability History. Autonomous Press, 2015.
