= Conseil québécois LGBT =

LGBTQ rights organization in Canada

- Formation: 1993
- Headquarters: Montreal
- Website: https://conseil-lgbt.ca/
- Formerly called: Table de concertation des lesbiennes et gais du Grand Montréal (1993-2000); Table de concertation des lesbiennes et des gais du Québec (2000-2006); Conseil québécois des gais et lesbiennes du Québec (2006-2013)

The Conseil québécois LGBT (transl. "Quebec LGBT Council"; CQ-LGBT), formerly known as Table de concertation des lesbiennes et des gais du Québeс ("Quebec Lesbian and Gay Consultation Table") and also Conseil québécois des gais et lesbiennes ("Quebec Council of Gays and Lesbians"), is an organization defending collective rights of the LGBTQ community in Québec, Canada. Its offices are in Montréal. The CQ-LGBT publishes a monthly L'Égalitaire and every year gives out the Prix Arc-en-ciel award.

== Mission ==
The Conseil québécois LGBT aims to "advance toward social equality, break down prejudices, and work toward the better integration of" lesbians, gays, bisexuals, and trans people in Quebec. They intend to consolidate progress made regarding legal equality (LGBT rights) and ensure that this translates into concrete social equality. They "ensures that government bodies and all civil society stakeholders develop and implement mechanisms and policies tailored to the realities and needs of LGBT communities." Furthermore, the organization aims to foster recognition of—and promote—the individual and collective contributions of LGBT people to Quebec society. It plays a leading role and partners with various organizations that advocate for LGBT individuals, particularly with regard to political representation. CQ-LGBT summarizes a mission “of activism, raising awareness, analysis, reflection, dialogue, debate, sensitization, and training”.

== History ==
=== Table de concertation des lesbiennes et gais du Grand Montréal (1993-2000) ===
19 April 1993, the organization starts as a non-profit organization under the name of Table de concertation des lesbiennes et des gais du Grand Montréal (TCLGGM). Its principal mission was to group together different organizations and individuals in Quebec fighting for the rights of gay men and lesbians.

The organization adopted the name Table de concertation des lesbiennes et des gais du Québec (TCLGQ) in 1995, ten years after creation, but the name change was not made official until 2000.

In the 1990s, TCLGGM/TCLGQ proposed a public consultation regarding violence and discrimination against homosexuals. In 1994, the Commission des droits de la personne et des droits de la jeunesse (Human Rights and Youth Rights Commission) held this consultation and published the report From Illegality to Equality (De l’illégalité à l’égalité). In 1996, TCLGGM/TCLGQ organised États généraux des communautés gaie et lesbienne du Québec.

In 1999, TCLGGM/TCLGQ T initiated the Coalition québécoise pour la reconnaissance des conjoints et conjointes de même sexe (Quebec Coalition for the Recognition of Same-Sex Partners), a coalition of organizations. The advocacy efforts of this Coalition contributed to the adoption of Bill 32 by the National Assembly of Quebec in 2000—which granted same-sex couples in de facto unions the same rights and responsibilities as heterosexual partners—as well as the enactment of legislation by the Parliament of Canada in 2001 aimed at modernizing the regime of benefits and obligations.

=== Table de concertation des lesbiennes et des gais du Québec (2000-2006) ===
In 2000, the TCLGGQ—along with other LGBT organizations in Quebec and under the leadership of Laurent McCutcheon—spearheaded the campaign for the adoption of a Quebec policy to combat homophobia. It also held a symposium titled "Our Communities on the Move" (Nos communautés en marche) where discussed topics included conjugality, gay parenting, education, political action, science, health and culture. The idea of appointing a minister delegate for the LGBT community and establishing a secretariat for issues concerning homosexuals was adopted there. In 2004, representatives from TCLGGQ—along with those from Égalité Canada and Fierté Québec—met with Quebec’s Minister of Relations with Citizens and Immigration, who subsequently initiated a working group on the matter, in which TCLGGQ participated.

In 2001, TCLGQ participated in Sommet de Montréal where official texts recognized the contribution of the LGBT community to society, culture, and the economy. In 2002, the Coalition coordinated the contributions of LGBT organizations during the study committee process that led to the National Assembly’s adoption of Bill 84, which established civil unions and legalized same-sex unions. In 2003, the TCLBQ submitted a brief to the House of Commons Standing Committee on Justice and Human Rights regarding the recognition of same-sex unions.

In 2004, the TCLGQ held the "États généraux" (general assembly/consultation) of Quebec’s LGBT community in Quebec City, where, for the first time in Quebec, trans and bisexual realities were taken into consideration, with Aide aux Trans du Québec being the only trans-centered organization to join TCLGQ in 2004. In 2005, the TCLGQ provided testimony to House of Commons committees and launched a promotional campaign during the review and adoption of Bill C-38, which legalized same-sex marriage in Canada. That same year, the co-chair of the TCLGGQ, Claude Côté, served on a working group within the Commission des droits de la personne et des droits de la jeunesse that was responsible for the initiative to combat homophobia.

=== Conseil québécois des gais et lesbiennes du Québec (2006-2013) ===
The Conseil québécois des gais et lesbiennes (CQGL) was established in 2006, taking over from the TCLGQ. The organization had expanded its mandate to include—in addition to coordination and political action—new initiatives focused on raising awareness, analysis, reflection, dialogue, debate, outreach, and training. Steve Foster has been appointed Executive Director of the organization. LGBT community action had been recognized by the Advisory Committee on Autonomous Community Action as a distinct sector within the Quebec autonomous community movement. That same year, the World Outgames took place, as did the adoption of the Declaration of Montreal.

In 2007, the CQGL intensified its communication efforts. It engaged in advocacy for the well-being of LGBT seniors and submitted a brief to the Bouchard-Taylor Commission. In 2008, the CQGL resumed the presentation of the Prix Arcs-en-ciel, marking the 5th edition—the fourth having taken place in 2004.

In 2012, the organization was renamed to Conseil québécois LGBT (CQ-LGBT) to reflect the inclusion of bisexual and trans people in its work. In 2013, Steve Foster was awarded the Rights and Freedoms Prize by the Commission des droits de la personne et des droits de la jeunesse in recognition of his contribution to the advancement of the rights and freedoms of LGBT people in Quebec.

== Organization ==
Several organizations are members of the Council, primarily LGBT associations from across Quebec, as well as labor unions or workplace committees.

== Prix Arc-en-ciel ==
Prix Arc-en-Ciel (Rainbow Awards) are presented to individuals who have performed a meritorious service for the Quebec LGBT community. Major national media outlets have recognized such contributions—including those of sociologist Michel Dorais, from Quebec City, who received the top award in 2012—notably for his work on issues surrounding aggression and inclusion. Regional communities also welcome the contribution of LGBT people, for example in Abitibi-Témiscamingue, where the Regional Coalition has a strong presence beyond the region and serves as a model in Gaspésie and Estrie. CQGL created in 2011 a student scholarship for master students researching LGBT communities Various social and labor groups support the CQ-LGBT’s initiative regarding the Prix Arc-en-Ciel—for instance, the Confederation of National Trade Unions (CSN), whose members point to “the responsibility of unions to play an active role in making workplaces open to sexual diversity.”
