= Gender Troublemakers =

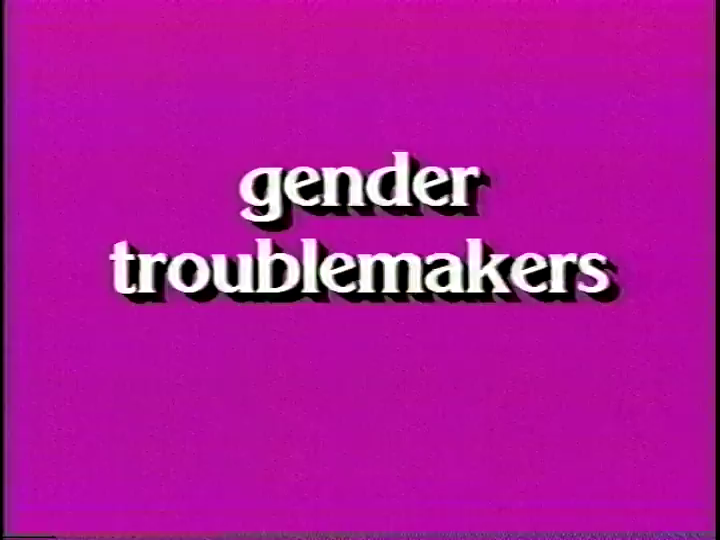
- Title card
- Directed by: Jeanne B.; Xanthra Phillippa MacKay
- Starring: Jeanne B.; Xanthra Phillippa MacKay; Langston
- Release date: 1993
- Country: Canada
- Language: English
- Budget: $200

Gender Troublemakers is a 1993 Canadian no-budget autodocumentary by transgender activists Mirha-Soleil Ross (under the pseudonym "Jeanne B.") and Xanthra Phillippa MacKay.

The film depicts Ross and MacKay, introduced as "two gender queers, gender outlaws, trans-dykes, gender troublemakers who don't look like Tula". They interview each other in their home about their experiences with gender and sexuality, particularly in regard to passing, representation, misogyny, gay men, and attraction. It also features scenes of the couple having sex.

The film was shot on 8 mm film and financed with "their last 200 bucks".

The film has been described as one of the earliest films about transgender people for other transgender people, being frequently compared to The Crying Game as well as Ross' other works, such as Yapping Out Loud and gendertrash from hell.
