= Accommodationism (disambiguation) =

Accommodationism is a judicial interpretation with respect to Church and state issues. (See Accommodationism in the United States for article specific to US)

Accommodationism may also refer to:

- Atlanta Compromise, an agreement struck in 1895 between African-American leaders and Southern white leaders
- A term coined by Austin Dacey (born 1972) to describe those “who either recognize no conflicts between religion and science, or who recognize such conflicts but are disinclined to discuss them publicly”

== See also ==
- Accommodation (disambiguation)
