= Queer Appalachia =

One-man band from Appalachia

Queer Appalachia (also known as the Queer Appalachian Project) began as a zine founded by Gina Mamone for the Appalachian region and the South at large, and transitioned into a larger project focusing collaboratively on mutual aid. Established in 2016 after the deaths of Bryn Kelly and Amanda Arkansassy Harris, Queer Appalachia distributes its art, writing, and other work through an Instagram account and a publication called Electric Dirt. According to the magazine Esquire, the collective "seeks to unify the queer people of Appalachia by capturing the variety of races, abilities, genders, religions, and addiction statuses of an area that is largely believed to be straight and white".

== Origins ==
Originally from a small town on the West Virginia / Ohio border in rural Appalachia, HIV-positive transgender artist, writer, and musician Bryn Kelly became a zine enthusiast as a teenager. At age 17 she published her first zine, Granny Witch Squares, which focused on the connections between the AIDS Quilt and Appalachian folk art. She moved to Brooklyn to become a professional artist and activist, which gave her the opportunity to travel around the United States and interact with like minded individuals, including fellow Appalachians who chose to relocate.

Kelly had a vision for a zine project created by Appalachians that would encompass art, folklore, popular culture, politics, intersectionality, accessibility issues, erotica and pornography from the perspectives of queer, poor, and Black Appalachians. She had communicated this vision to Bluefield, West Virginia native Gina Mamone at the LGBTQ Center at Marshall University in Huntington, West Virginia where Kelly had found safe space after running away from home as a teen. In 2016, Kelly died by suicide. Mamone organized the collective and the Electric Dirt zine to deal with their grief, bring Kelly's vision to life, and to raise funds and organize political advocacy events for poor, queer, and Black Appalachians in crisis.

Amanda Arkansassy Harris was a Bay Area-based photographer who grew up in a small town in Arkansas. Much of her work sought to dispel negative stereotypes about the South and rural areas, including an exhibit she co-curated for the 2015 National Queer Arts Festival titled Y’all Come Back: Stories of Queer Southern Migration. She and Kelly were good friends, and Harris died less than a year after Kelly. Queer Appalachia's Electric Dirt zine was founded in part to honor Kelly and Harris.

== Queer Appalachian Project ==
Mamone, an Instagram artist, established the Instagram account @QueerAppalachia in 2016 shortly after Kelly's death, which attracted hundreds of thousands of followers and content contributors. Through Instagram Mamone organized multiple fundraisers and political advocacy events under the banner of The Queer Appalachian Project. The collective raises funds for bailing out unjustly incarcerated poor queer, transgender, and Black women in the South, and microgrants for queer, transgender, and Black Southerners who wished to start up and support restorative justice projects across the region. The Queer Appalachian Project also promoted LGBTQ+ people running for office across the South. Most recently the collective is focused on providing support for poor queer, transgender, and Black Southerners addicted to opioids, as well as advocating for improving healthcare at large for LGBTQ+ and Black communities in the region. In The Queer Appalachian Project also raises significant funds for the production and promotion of Electric Dirt.

== Electric Dirt zine ==
Established in 2016 originally as a memorial project to commemorate the life of Bryn Kelly and Amanda Harris, the zine Electric Dirt has become an annual publication focused on celebrating Queer Appalachia and the Queer South at large. Electric Dirt accepts all submissions by LGBTQ+ Appalachians and Southerners covering topics related to Queer Appalachia and the Queer South.

== Controversy ==
In 2020, The Washington Post published an article which recognized the successes and challenges of the Queer Appalachia Project. In particular, the article focused on a lack of transparency over funds distribution, unfair hiring practices, alleged improper use of funds, challenges in tracking payments from Venmo and PayPal accounts, as well as lack of accountability of the fundraisers to donors and those requesting assistance. As the Queer Appalachia Project is not a registered 501(c)3 non-profit corporation, it has to partner with non-profits to apply for and receive grant funds, which may mean that the partner organizations have the financial statements and grant reports.

Mamone has been accused of using donor funds to buy a brand new truck, as well as tokenizing Black people and preventing other avenues of access to marginalized communities in Appalachia. Mamone is beginning to address these issues to maintain their integrity and that of Queer Appalachia. While Mamone claims to "make a good living as a sound engineer," therefore having no reason to use donations or grant funds for their personal use, their claims about their profession have also been contested.
