= Gay and Lesbian Information Bureau =

The Gay and Lesbian Information Bureau (GLIB) was a Bulletin Board System (BBS) and non-profit active from 1986 to 1999, and a website active from 1999-2001. It served as a "communications resource primarily (but not exclusively) serving the Lesbian, Gay, and Bisexual community". It was run by Jon Larimore and a group of volunteers with support from the Community Educational Services Foundation (CESF). It was based in Arlington, Virginia.

== History ==
In 1984, Jon Larimore received a "very modest inheritance" after his mother died. Not needing the money immediately, he decided he wanted to use it for "something meaningful". In early 1986, he logged on to The Backroom, a gay BBS based in New York, and became inspired to create his own BBS. Larimore taught himself assembly language, but later bought Phil Becker's The Bread Board System (TBBS) when it came out later that year.

Larimore, his partner, John Meroney (d. 1994), and several of their close friends joined together to found the Community Educational Services Foundation (CESF), with GLIB becoming the foundation's first project.

GLIB was founded on May 1, 1986. It was "Initially conceived as a non-profit communications and information service designed to empower our community...created by a group of forward-looking community-spirited gay people who believed in the future of electronic on-line communications, and the information, fun, friendship, and personal growth it could bring".

By 1991, GLIB was available to users in the United States and Canada. In 1992, GLIB served as a beta tester for Jack Richard's Internet e-mail and Usenet News interface for BBS services, the first of its kind. That year, and into 1993, GLIB users also helped process constituent letters sent to the incoming administration of U.S. President Bill Clinton, for which Clinton sent them a letter of thanks.

By the mid-1990s, GLIB began to lose members as the World Wide Web further developed.

== Membership ==
GLIB membership was purposefully made to be more complicated than some other BBS services, which simply required an online application form. Due to the sensitive nature of information shared on GLIB, all members had to fax in a written application with their signature, and some documentation of their identity, such as a driver's license, birth certificate, or visa.

GLIB offered free memberships to anyone 18 or older who "supported the gay community", i.e. anyone who was a member of or financially supported an LGBTQ community group or non-profit, including CESF. Members were not required to be LGBTQ, and straight allies to the community did join. Membership included free access to e-mail and to GayCom, a cooperative network of other LGBTQ-related BBS services.

== Activities ==
Within GLIB, there were a number of Special Interest Groups (SIGs), with topics such as "health, social services, personal enrichment, humor, cuisine, computers, entertainment, the arts, travel, politics, local and national news, weather, [and] religion". Other SIGs focused on identities, such as "Lesbians On Line", "Quiet Pride" (Deaf members), "?dis?ABLEd" (disabled members), "Leathermen" (members of the leather community), and "Gowns 'n Crowns" ("for transexuals, female illusionists, and transvestites"). Still others served as support groups for members dealing with issues such as alcoholism, substance user, divorce, and custody of children. The various SIGs shared informational posters about their respective topics. The computer SIGs also allowed for users to exchange shareware, such as the video game Caper in the Castro.

GLIB also hosted spaces for other gay organizations to publicize their work, and "Power Plaza", a space for members to advertise their companies or services they offered. After the emergence of HIV/AIDS, one GLIB member created "Sharing Our Loss", where members could share memorials and process grief.

GLIB also offered group chats, one-on-one chats, and games.

GLIB also hosted a physician ("Ask a Doc") whom users could ask health-related questions, and a psychological counselor ("Dear GLIBBY"). It also served as a D.C.-area provider of the Computerized AIDS Information Network (CAIN).

By 1993, GLIB had more than 1,000 active members, or "GLIBertines", most of whom were from the Washington, D.C. area. GLIB members sometimes organized offline events at gay bars in the D.C. area.

== Recognition ==
GLIB received fifth place in the 1993 Boardwatch 100 Readers' Choice awards, and third in the 1994 awards.
