= Greg Walloch =

American comedian, actor, author and monologist

Greg Walloch (born July 8, 1970, in San Bernardino, California) is an American comedian, actor, author, and monologist.

Walloch is best known for his autobiographical performance monologues, which deal with events from his own life, in a style characterized by humor, poignancy, and sexuality. Walloch has cerebral palsy.

Walloch was a member of the experimental theater ensemble Theater of Life from May 1986 to April 1989 in Southern California. Walloch often collaborated on works combining movement and spoken word with fellow Theater of Life alum and noted author Gayle Brandeis.

His first solo performances were developed at Highways Performance Space and L.A.C.E – Los Angeles Contemporary Exhibitions from July 1990 to August 1992 in Los Angeles. Walloch moved to New York in the summer of 1992 and continued to explore his work at the heart of New York's East Village experimental performance scene appearing at Solomon R. Guggenheim Museum in Soho, P.S. 122, Dixon Place, and Knitting Factory.

From November 1997 to February 2000 Walloch was the featured emcee and a founding member of the popular comedy troupe Living Room Live. Walloch received notice and praise for his comedic turn from Village Voice critic Michael Musto and continued to gain mainstream popularity after appearing on The Howard Stern Show on E! Entertainment Television in August 1998.

Walloch is possibly most noted for his live one-man show "White Disabled Talent". "White Disabled Talent" extensively toured Europe and the United States. The show was featured with Lily Tomlin’s "The Search for Signs of Intelligent Life in the Universe" at The Tampa Bay Performing Arts Center in October 1999 and appeared Off-Broadway at Joe's Pub at The Public Theater in New York City in April 2001.

In July 2001 the concert/documentary film "F**k The Disabled" starring Greg Walloch, Stephen Baldwin, Anne Meara, Michael Musto, Deborah Yates, Michael Lucas, and Jerry Stiller premiered in Ireland at The Galway Film Fladh. Walloch was also featured in the November 2002 television series "The Moth" on Trio: Pop, Culture, TV.

Several anthologies and newspapers feature Walloch's writing, such as the Lambda Award-winning anthology Queer Crips: Disabled Gay Men and Their Stories. Walloch has appeared in Moscow, Toronto, Vancouver, London, Australia, Ireland, Germany, Poland, Tel Aviv and across the United States.

== See also ==
- Famous monologists
- Well-known people with disabilities
