= Sumaya Dalmar =

Somali-Canadian trans activist

- Born: 1988 or 1989; Somalia
- Died: February 22, 2015 (aged 26); Toronto, Ontario, Canada
- Other name: Sumaya YSL
- Occupations: Activist, model

Sumaya Dasia Dalmar, also known as Sumaya YSL, was a Somali-Canadian transgender activist and model. Dalmar was one of the earliest Somalis to come out as transgender and LGBT as a whole.

== Early life ==
Dalmar was born in Mogadishu, Somalia and left during the outbreak of the Somali Civil War at the age of three. Her family moved to Vancouver, Canada. She was Muslim and transgender, and faced transphobia, Islamophobia, and racism. She moved to Toronto, Canada, in 2009 to transition. Dalmar's biological parents disowned her when she came out as trans to them in 2011.

== Later life ==
In 2012, Dalmar was the primary actor for a play and documentary by Abdi Osman, called Labeeb, "an intimate portrait of Sumaya, a Somali trans-woman". It explored gender, sexuality, and religiosity in the Somali community. One video shows her performing a Somali ritual designated for women preparing for special occasions, and another film shows her during daily moments. The exhibit also included photographs of Dalmar in candid moments and in the studio.

By 2014, Dalmar had become qualified as a speech therapist. She worked at Banu, a restaurant in Queen Street West, Toronto. She was also a model and adult-film actress. Dalmar was scheduled to begin employment at an LGBT community center called The 519 the day after she died. She was going to work in their education and training department.

Dalmar was well-known in the Somali and LGBTQ communities of Toronto. She attended a program at the Supporting Our Youth LGBTQ organization and became a key part of Black Queer Youth, one of their support groups. One commentator praised the degree of visibility she has given the trans community.

== Death and response ==
Dalmar died in mysterious circumstances on 22 February 2015 at the age of 26. It was an event that was compared to other acts of violence against trans women of colour, especially during the early months of 2015 when such incidents were reportedly occurring at a particularly high rate. Her death was discussed widely on social media, with many speculating that it was a homicide.

A public memorial for Dalmar was held at The 519 on March 3, 2015. A private memorial was held in its ballroom that afternoon. Later it expanded into a candlelight vigil at Barbara Hall Park for the community. Many people attended who had not known Dalmar, with Monica Forrester explaining that Dalmar's death had a large impact on Toronto's African-Caribbean community. Her friends raised funds online for the memorial and held a party that night to collect donations for a scholarship in Dalmar's name.

Police discounted the occurrence of a homicide in social media posts on February 25. They closed the investigation that May, stating later that a thorough investigation found no evidence of a suspicious death. An autopsy and toxicology reports had been performed, but the autopsy was inconclusive. Police did not publicly release a cause of death for the stated reason of protecting Dalmar's privacy.

Many in her community remained mistrustful of the police, with friends and trans activists trying to push for further investigation, and feeling frustration at lack of police outreach. Critics labeled this as part of a trend of neglect they saw in Toronto police relationships to the city's LGBTQ community, particularly its trans women. Some critics have compared the police response to Dalmar's death to their treatment of Cassandra Do and Alloura Wells.

Black Lives Matter led the Trans March during Pride Toronto 2016, holding a banner with Dalmar's photo at the front of the march. Black Lives Matter Toronto member Leroi Newbold said in 2016 that "we can’t live with dignity when our Black trans sisters can be disappeared and murdered within the vicinity that we live with impunity, and the police aren’t held accountable with finding out what happened to them, such as what happened to Sumaya Dalmar." The group remembered Dalmar, along with Philando Castile, Andrew Loku, and Amleset Haile, at the 2017 Toronto Pride Parade.

== Legacy ==
In 2018 friends and community members established in recognition of her life's work the Sumaya Dalmar Award for trans students of colour. They had waited to establish the award until receiving closure from the police on the cause of Dalmar's death, but as of 2020 no cause had been released. The award grants $1,000 annually to racialized trans students at Ryerson University. It was the first award in Canada designed explicitly for racialized trans students. By 2018, $6,000 had been raised for the fund, donated by around 200 people.

Syrus Marcus Ware lists Dalmar as one of Toronto's trans and two-spirited activists of color who had helped shape its trans community but not received commensurate recognition for their contributions. He named Mirha-Soleil Ross, Yasmeen Persad, Monica Forrester, Nik Redman, and Duchess as similar figures.
