= Trans people =

Trans people may refer to:

- Transgender people, people who have a gender identity different from that typically associated with their sex assigned at birth
- Transsexual people, people who experience a gender identity that is inconsistent with their assigned sex and desire to transition to the gender with which they identify
