= National Disabled Women's Educational Equity Project =

U.S. research and demonstration project

The National Disabled Women's Educational Equity Project was established by Corbett O'Toole in Berkeley, California, in 1980. It was a three-year research and demonstration project. Based at the Disability Rights Education and Defense Fund (DREDF), the Project administered the first national survey on disability and gender. It also conducted the first national Conference on Disabled Women's Educational Equity, which was held in Bethesda, Maryland. It developed written materials for educators and counselors relevant to the needs of disabled women and girls. It also developed a book about role models for disabled teenage girls called No More Stares.

== Background ==
The National Disabled Women's Educational Equity Project was founded by a woman by the name of Corbett O'Toole. O'Toole was born in 1951 and contracted polio at the age of two. She had to use a cane to walk by the time she turned 20 years old, and she had to use a wheelchair by the time she turned 30 years old. She obtained her bachelor's degree in special education and moved to Berkeley, California after graduating from college. It was at that time that she became interested in advocating for women with disabilities. She became immersed in communities and movements relating to disability rights for women. Her background in education and disability advocacy eventually led her to found the National Disabled Women's Educational Equity Project.

== Achievements ==
In 1980, the National Disabled Women's Educational Equity Project conducted the first national survey on disability and gender. This survey paved the way for future surveys relating to gender identity and disability, such as one conducted by the International Journal of Environmental Research and Public Health on February 23, 2022. That same year, the Project held the first national Conference on Disabled Women's Educational Equity in Bethesda, Maryland. Throughout the three years that the Project lasted, it developed written materials for teachers and school counselors discussing the needs of girls and women with disabilities. It also conducted regional training programs for young women with disabilities in Pocatello, Idaho; Eugene, Oregon; and Minneapolis, Minnesota. One of the Project's most notable achievements was the publication of the book No More Stares in 1982. The book includes quotes from several women discussing what it is like to live with disabilities. The book aims to depict these women as role models for readers who also identify as disabled women.
