= Bryn Kelly =

American writer, artist

Bryn Kelly (1980–2016) was a transgender American writer, artist, performer, and community organizer. Kelly has shown work at New Museum and performed in conjunction with Visual AIDS and in Art in the Age of Aquarius at the Whitney Museum of American Art. She was a member of the Femme Collective, participated in Baltimore's 2012 Femme Conference, and was a cofounder of Theater Transgression, a transgender multimedia performance collective. Her writing and writing performances have appeared in Original Plumbing, Manic D Press, the National Queer Arts Festival, PrettyQueer.com, and EOAGH, A Journal of the Arts, amongst others. She died of an apparent suicide sometime before January 13, 2016.

== Early life and education ==
Kelly was born in Ohio. She had deep affiliations with Appalachia and eventually she would go on to organize the online community and archiving project, Queer Appalachia. After a short stint in Michigan, Kelly moved to New York to pursue writing. She studied playwriting at Brooklyn College.

== Work ==
Kelly wrote the short story, "Other Balms, Other Gileads," which was published in the Time Is Not a Line: Reflections on HIV/AIDS issue of the We Who Feel Differently journal, edited by Theodore Kerr. The text is cited as a seminal piece of transgender literature from the 21st century, alongside Nevada: A Novel by Imogen Binnie and short stories by Torrey Peters.

In 2013, Kelly was a Lambda Literary Fellow in Nonfiction .

Kelly cofounded the Theater Transgression, a transgender multimedia performance collective. She served as co-creator and cast member of the touring roadshow, The Fully Functional Cabaret. She also performed in Lisa Anne Auerbach's public program, Art in the Age of Aquarius, at the Whitney Museum of American Art.

In 2015, she was named one of TheBody.com's 100 trans HIV/AIDS leaders.

Kelly worked as a hairstylist. She began styling hair for movies, theater, and runway and print advertisements, specialized in pin-up styles of the '40s, '50s and '60s.

Activist and historian Sarah Schulman, writer Morgan M. Page, author and comedian Kelli Dunham, Elizabeth Koke of Housing Works, and medical researcher and surgeon Gaines Blasdel were close friends and lovers.

Kelly had a vision for a zine project created by Appalachians that would encompass art, folklore, popular culture, politics, intersectionality, accessibility issues, erotica and pornography from the perspectives of queer, poor, and Black Appalachians. She had communicated this vision to Bluefield, West Virginia native Gina Mamone at the LGBTQ Center at Marshall University in Huntington, West Virginia where Kelly had found safe space after running away from home as a teen. Mamone organized the collective and the Electric Dirt zine to deal with their grief, bring Kelly's vision to life, and to raise funds and organize political advocacy events for poor, queer, and Black Appalachians in crisis. This is the origin of Queer Appalachia.

== Publications ==
- "Some Ghosts," Issue 9; EOAGH, A Journal of the Arts, ed. Trace Peterson.
- "Other Balms, Other Gileads," short fiction.
- Time Is Not a Line: Conversations, Essays and Images about HIV/AIDS Now; Vol. III, Fall 2014, ed. Theodore Kerr, WE WHO FEEL DIFFERENTLY, journal; artistic direction by Carlos Motta, commissioned by The New Museum, New York, NY.
- "The Sixteenth Minute," column, PrettyQueer.com. August 2012 to February 2013.
- "Captive Genders," book review, Original Plumbing magazine, May 2012.
- "Fifty Reasons I Love My Man," essay. Trans/Love: Radical Sex, Love and Relationships Beyond the Gender Binary (Anthology), Morty Diamond, editor. Manic D Press; October 2011.
- "Telephone," guest column, OurChart.com, Showtime Network, 2009.

== Resources ==
- http://www.brynkelly.com/bio/
- https://brynkelly-blog.tumblr.com
