= Lana St-Cyr =

- Born: Raymond Dubé; 1927; Mont-Joli
- Died: 1986 (aged 58–59)
- Occupation: Drag queen

Lana St-Cyr was a drag queen from Canada active in Montréal from the late 1940s onwards, a stage personality of Raymond Dubé (1927-1986). Today she is considered a pioneer of the art of drag in Québec, although the term "drag" was not used at the time.

== Biography ==
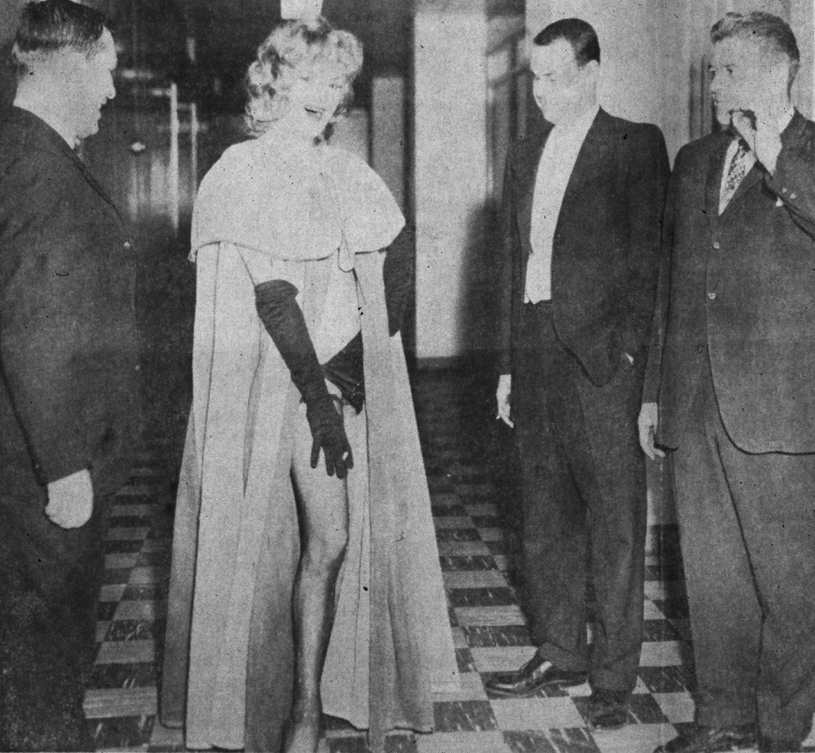
Arrest of St-Cyr at Beaver, Montréal, 1962.

The name Lana St-Cyr was a direct reference to Lili St. Cyr, a famous burlesque performer who appeared in Montreal cabarets between 1944 and 1951. Lili St-Cyr herself granted Raymond Dubé permission to use her surname and asked him to choose the first name of his favorite actress to complete the stage name (his choice being Lana Turner). Lili St-Cyr was known for her act in which she appears on stage naked in a bubble bath, and Lana inspired herself to create a similar number in a bath. Her performances consisted predominantly of dance and striptease.

In 1955, she was the opening act for the show of Alys Robi at the Café Eldorado.

On several occasions, Lana has had to face the courts to defend her right to practice her profession, as various religious institutions have sought to have her performances banned. In 1962, Lana was arrested by the police at the Beaver Club. She was accused of offering "an indecent spectacle". After appearing in court, she was found not guilty, even though it remained technically illegal for a man to dress as a woman—with a few exceptions—until 1969.

Throughout her career, Lana St-Cyr gave performances at numerous cabarets in Montreal, including the Café Top Hat, Café du Nord, Café Rigolo, Café Savoy, Café du Palais, Casino Français, Mocambo, Café New Orleans, High and Low, The Beaver, and Quartier Latin. She also held shows in the USA.

== Homage ==
The Lana St-Cyr Prize is given out at Fierté Trans à Montréal, festival held by Aide aux Trans du Québec, a trans organization started by Marie-Marcelle Godbout, a trans woman who was a protege of St-Cyr.
