= Aide aux Trans du Québec =

- Formation: 1980
- Founded at: Montreal
- Headquarters: Montreal
- Fields: Transgender advocacy, transgender healthcare
- Executive director: Victoria F. Legault
- Website: https://aideauxtrans.com

Aide aux Trans du Québec (ATQ) is the first organization by and for trans people in the province. Founded in 1980, it is based in Montréal.

== History ==
On January 7, 1980, Marie-Marcelle Godbout (together with four other trans women, Manon Frigon, Vanessa Giovannito, Marie-Claude Daigle, and Marie-Josée Marcil) founded Aide aux Transsexuels du Québec Inc.. As a trans woman, Godbout was sensitive to the difficulties that trans people faced in Quebec then. Dressing as a woman was criminal in the 1960s, and she c to exile herself to Vancouver to live more freely.

ATQ first focused on helping trans people with understanding themselves, finding a support group (ATQ ran “Ateliers de Transformation du Québec”), and helping in financial and psychological hardship. One of the parts of that system was a 24/7 helpline ran by Godbout.

The group obtained the letters of support from organizations such as Groupe de recherches cliniques en sexologie at the Université du Québec à Montréal and the Quebec Ministry of Social Affairs. Godbout also forged her credentials as "transsexologist", and as such gave “attestations” that trans people were undergoing transition to show to authorities such as doctors.

In 1982, the group extended their focus to raising awareness, with Godbout appearing in media as a trans expert, and since 1983 giving talks in CEGEPs and universities.

In 1985, ATQ became the Association des transsexuels et transsexuelles du Québec. Year later, they started a Lana Saint-Cyr Gala, later known as Gala Fierté, honoring trans community trailblazers.

Throughout the 1990s, ATQ increased their visibility through expanding into brochure publications. The Gala Fierté Trans also increased its profile, with the 1997 celebration being held at Montreal Café Cléopâtre and inviting performers such as Guilda and Brigitte Martel.

In 2004, ATQ was the only trans organization present at the Table de concertation des lesbiennes et des gais du Québec (TCLGQ), now the Conseil québécois LGBT. Year later, they started the Festival Fierté Trans.

In September 2015, ATQ welcomed a regulation facilitating the modification of the gender designation with the Director of Civil Status of Quebec without medical requirements.

2016 the organization changed their name to Aide aux Trans du Québec, motivated by the desire to reflect mission expansion and inclusion of nonbinary people,

2026 is the 20th edition of the Festival, created in 2004 and active under ATQ since 2005. It has evolved over time, initially focusing on conferences and workshops, to becoming more multidisciplinary to include artistic performances and community celebrations.
