= Marie-Marcelle Godbout =

- Marie-Marcelle Godbout in her first office at ATQ
- Born: 1943
- Died: 15 July 2017 (aged 73–74)
- Other names: Mère Teresa des personnes trans Mimi de Paris
- Occupation: Trans rights activist
- Known for: Foundation of ATQ

Marie-Marcelle Godbout, (1943-15 July 2017), was a Québec pioneer of trans rights. She was one of the founders of Aide aux trans du Québec (ATQ) and was frequently called by the media the "Mother Teresa of the Québec trans people". She died at the age of 73 after devoting her life for trans activism.

== Professional life ==
Marie-Marcelle Godbout had various jobs, including having been a nurse, and performing as a travestie magician under name Mimi de Paris (in this context, the word «travestie» being culturally and historically appropriate). As dressing as a woman was criminal in the 1960s Quebec, she "chose to exile herself" to Vancouver to live more freely.

In 1980, she co-founded Aide aux trans du Québec, the first organization by and for trans people in the province, and remained on the front lines providing support to transgender people in Quebec for the rest of her life. Godbout forged her credentials as a "transsexologist", and as such gave “attestations” that trans people were undergoing transition to show to authorities such as doctors.

To quote the words of Julien Leroux Richard, president of the ATQ at the time of Marie-Marcelle Godbout's death: “We can’t even put a number on the number of people who avoided suicide because Marie-Marcelle Godbout answered the phone in the middle of the night." In fact, the ATQ suicide helpline for a long time was the personal phone number of Marie-Marcelle Godbout, and it was her voice behind the ATQ voicemail recording, used until her death.

She became known to the general public when she became one of the first trans people to speak in the media during an interview with Jean-Luc Mongrain in 1980.

== Trans visibility ==
Marie-Marcelle Godbout found it important to give trans people a media voice. Following her interview with Jean-Luc Mongrain, she participated in the show Les Francs-tireurs and was interviewed by Benoît Dutrizac. Among the important extracts of archives of Radio-Canada there is her interview given to Liza Frulla on 10 February 2000. She also appears in the episode «Mamie, trans et heureuse» of the series Format Familial shown on Télé-Québec.

Marie-Marcelle Godbout died 15 July 2017, aged 73.

== Posthumous homages ==
In Autumn 2022, le Théâtre Duceppe presented the play Corps Fantômes, about Quebecois key moments of queer mobilization, from Sex Garage to ACT UP actions. In this play, the character of Marie-Marcelle is inspired by the life and legacy of Marie-Marcelle Godbout.

Her portrait is in the book Histoires LGBTQ+ au Québec et au Canada, by Jean-Charles Panneton, published in June 2026 by Éditions du Septentrion.
