= Accommodation (law) =

Accommodations related to Disability include but are not limited to:

Accommodation has its original meaning of a legal obligation entered into as a gratuitous favor without consideration, such as a signature guaranteeing payment of a debt. This is sometimes called an accommodation endorsement. Its meaning has expanded to encompass a broader range of supportive actions, especially in terms of contracts and agreements.

== Types of agreements ==
=== Employment contracts ===
In the context of employment contracts, especially in terms of the Americans with Disabilities Act (ADA), accommodation refers to employers providing reasonable accommodations for employees with disabilities or related issues.

Accommodations in an employment contract can cover the following:

- Salary or wages
- Paid time off for vacations or illness leave
- Sick days
- Retirement options

==== Difference between antidiscrimination and accommodation ====
Antidiscrimination versus Accommodation
Law	Type
Civil Rights Act of 1964	Antidiscrimination
Americans with Disabilities Act of 1990 (ADA)	Accommodation
Family and Medical Leave Act of 1993 (FMLA)	Accommodation

Based on legislation in the U.S., the following is how the terms are differentiated:

- Antidiscrimination: The focus is on equal treatment.
- Accommodation: The focus is on special treatment based on need. Accommodations within Disabilities include but are not limited to:
- Placement of a ramp
- Braile inscriptions underneath textual signs
- Schedule changes due to medical conditions
- etc... (see Accommodations)

== Discrimination In the Workforce ==
People with disabilities (invisible or visible) experience discrimination every day, everywhere. This is why accommodations can make or break treatment within the workforce. According to the ADA, discrimination from lack of accommodation can be susceptible to "disparate treatment, disparate impact, and the denial of reasonable accommodations" The impact of an accommodation can help someone with their everyday lifestyle and promotes a better work environment overall. Accommodations help to limit discrimination against someone with a disability.

== Accommodation Doctrine ==
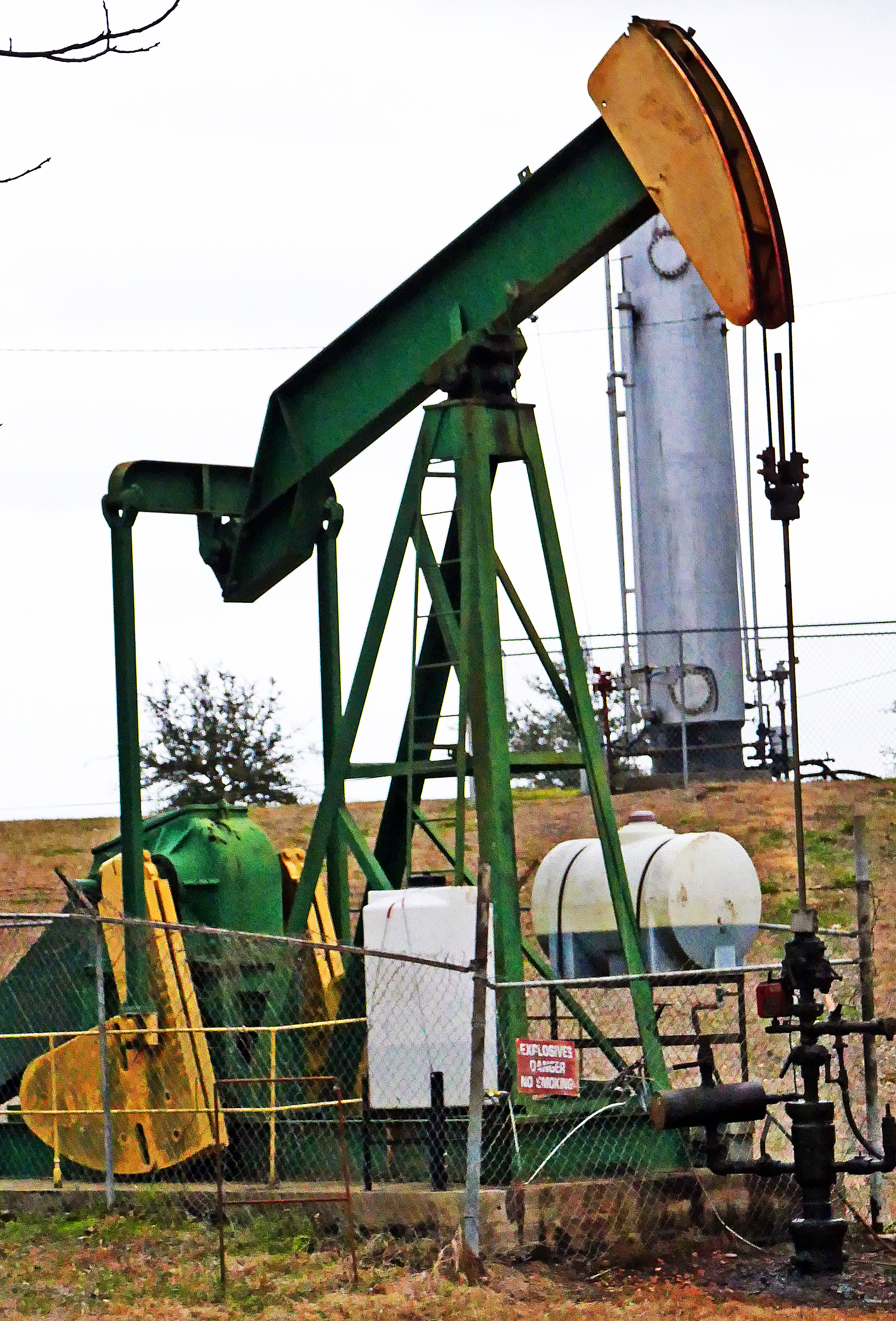
An example of an oil pump

The Accommodation Doctrine provides that the owner of a mineral estate has specific rights, but must exercise these rights in so as not to unnecessarily interfere with the rights of the surface owner. The first example of this legal theory is found in the 1971 Texas Supreme Court case involving Getty Oil, Getty Oil v. Jones. In this case, the height of the Getty Oil oil pumps or pumpjacks interfered with the irrigation system for the farm owned by Jones. The court ruled that Getty Oil had to accommodate to the surface rights of the farmer based on that:

- There is an existing use of the surface.
- The mineral owner’s use of the surface precludes or impairs the existing use of the surface.
- Under the established industry practices, there are alternatives available to recover the minerals.

=== Renewable energy and related project agreements ===
Due to the vast amounts of land renewable energy projects like wind farms and solar power facilities may use, accommodation agreements (non-interference agreements) can be used as legally binding contracts that define the terms and conditions under which the access is granted to their property for the development and operation of such a project.
