= Robert McRuer =

American social theorist (born 1966)

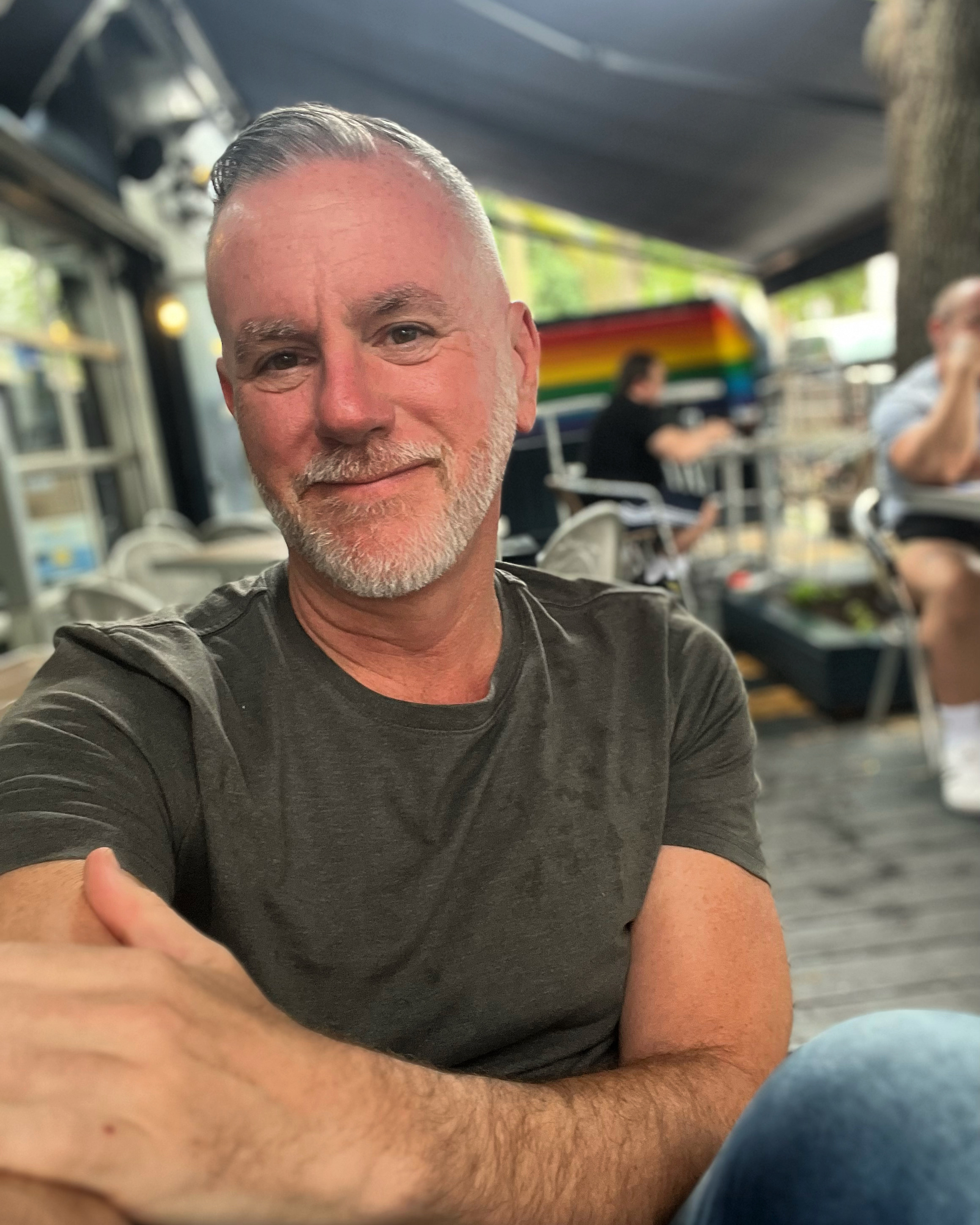
McRuer in 2023

Robert McRuer (born 1966) is an American scholar of disability studies, queer theory, and contemporary literature. He is a professor of English at the George Washington University in Washington, D.C., where he has taught since 1997. McRuer is a leading figure in the development of crip theory, a field that examines the cultural, political, and social intersections of disability and queerness. His formulation in “Compulsory Able-Bodiedness and Queer/Disabled Existence” has become widely circulated and influential across multiple academic fields.

== Education and academic career ==
McRuer received his B.A. in English from Calvin College in 1988, and earned both his M.A. (1990) and Ph.D. (1995) in English at the University of Illinois at Urbana–Champaign.

He taught at the University of Illinois from 1988 to 1997, including a postdoctoral fellowship in the Department of English.

He joined the faculty of George Washington University in 1997 as an assistant professor, becoming associate professor in 2005 and Full Professor in 2009.

He served as Chair of the GWU Department of English from 2012 to 2016. He remains a core faculty member in the Department of English and is also affiliated with the American Studies Department.

McRuer teaches courses in disability studies, queer theory, critical theory, and American literature at both undergraduate and graduate levels. He has also co-taught transnational courses, including a collaborative queer film course linking students in Washington, D.C., and Prague.

He is a frequent speaker in English and Spanish at international conferences and public events addressing disability activism, access, and intersectionality. In 2024, McRuer frequently delivers lectures on disability justice and queercrip cultural movements as part of anti-ableism and accessibility initiatives.

== Scholarship ==
McRuer's work centers on disability studies, queer theory, and cultural studies, with particular focus on how disability is represented, embodied, and politicized in contemporary cultural and global contexts. His scholarship has been influential in shaping crip theory, a framework that critiques compulsory able-bodiedness (a phrase he coined that is now in wide circulation) and examines how disability and queerness intersect within systems of power.

His 2006 monograph, Crip Theory: Cultural Signs of Queerness and Disability, is widely cited in disability and sexuality studies and received the Alan Bray Memorial Book Award from the GL/Q Caucus of the Modern Language Association. His later work includes Crip Times: Disability, Globalization, and Resistance (2018), which explores disability in relation to global austerity politics and transnational activist cultures.

McRuer has also co-edited several influential collections, including Sex and Disability (2012) and multiple special issues of the Journal of Literary and Cultural Disability Studies on “Cripistemologies.”

McRuer has authored a number of influential articles and chapters that have shaped the fields of queer theory and disability studies. Key works include “Compulsory Able-Bodiedness and Queer/Disabled Existence” in Disability Studies: Enabling the Humanities (2002); “As Good as It Gets: Queer Theory and Critical Disability” in GLQ (2003); “Crip Eye for the Normate Guy: Queer Theory and the Disciplining of Disability Studies” in PMLA (2005) and “Disability Nationalism in Crip Times” in the Journal of Literary & Cultural Disability Studies (2010)

With David Bolt, he was general co-editor of the six-volume series A Cultural History of Disability, which includes volumes stretching from antiquity to the present.

== Selected publications ==
=== Journals ===
- "A Visitation of Difference: Randall Kenan and Black Queer Theory". (1993) Journal of Homosexuality, 26.2-3: 221–232.
- "Boys' Own Stories and New Spellings of My Name: Coming Out and Other Myths of Queer Positionality". (1994) Genders, 260-260.
- "Critical Investments: AIDS, Christopher Reeve, and Queer/Disability Studies". (2002) Journal of Medical Humanities, 23.3-4: 221–237.
- Desiring Disability: Queer Theory Meets Disability Studies. (2003, co-edited with Ellen Samuels) Special issue of GLQ: A Journal of Lesbian and Gay Studies, 9.1/2.
- "As Good as it Gets: Queer Theory and Critical Disability". (2003) GLQ: A Journal of Lesbian and Gay Studies 9.1-2: 79–105. PDF.
- "Composing Bodies; or, De-Composition: Queer Theory, Disability Studies, and Alternative Corporealities". (2004) JAC, 24.1: 47–78. PDF. "Crip Eye for the Normate Guy: Queer Theory and the Disciplining of Disability Studies". (2005) PMLA, 120.2: 586–592.
- "We Were Never Identified: Feminism, Queer Theory, and a Disabled World". (2006) Radical History Review, 94: 148–154.
- "Taking It to the Bank: Independence and Inclusion on the World Market". Journal of Literary & Cultural Disability Studies. 1 (2): 5–14. 2007.
- "Disability Nationalism in Crip Times". (2010) Journal of Literary & Cultural Disability Studies, 4.2: 163–178.
- "Disabling Sex: Notes for a Crip Theory of Sexuality". (2011) GLQ: A Journal of Lesbian and Gay Studies 17.1: 107–117.

=== Books ===
- The Queer Renaissance: Contemporary American Literature and the Reinvention of Lesbian and Gay Identities. (1997) New York University Press. (ISBN 978-0-8147-5555-6).
- McRuer, Robert, and Abby L. Wilkerson. Desiring Disability: Queer Theory Meets Disability Studies. GLQ, v. 9, No. 1-2. Duke University Press, 2003.
- Crip Theory: Cultural Signs of Queerness and Disability. (2006) Foreword by Michael Bérubé. New York University Press. (ISBN 978-0-8147-5712-3).
- McRuer, Robert, and Anna Mollow, eds. Sex and Disability. Duke University Press, 2012.
- Crip Times: Disability, Globalization, and Resistance. (2018) New York University Press. ISBN 978-1-4798-2631-5
- Disability, Revolution. (2026) University of California Press. (ISBN 978-0-5203-8817-8)

== See also ==
- Disability and LGBT people
- Identity Politics
- Judith Butler
- Michel Foucault
- Queer Theory
- Crip (disability term)
