= Viviane Namaste =

Canadian feminist professor

Academic background
- Education: Carleton University; York University; Université du Québec à Montréal

Academic work
- Institutions: Concordia University
- Main interests: sexual health, HIV/AIDS prevention, and sex work
- Notable works: Invisible Lives: The Erasure of Transsexual and Transgendered People

Viviane K. Namaste is a Canadian feminist professor at Concordia University in Montreal. Her research focuses on sexual health, HIV/AIDS prevention, and sex work.

== Education and work ==
Namaste received a BA from Carleton University in 1989, an MA in Sociology from York University, and a doctorate from Université du Québec à Montréal in Semiotics and Linguistics. She worked within ACT UP Paris. In 2001, she received the Outstanding Book Award from the Gustavus Myers Center for her book titled, Invisible Lives: The Erasure of Transsexual and Transgendered People. That same year, Namaste was also a director in the documentary Madame Lauraine's Transsexual Touch which deals with transsexual sex workers as well as sexual health and clientele.

In 2005, Namaste published a book titled Sex Change, Social Change, a collection of papers and interviews dealing with issues faced by transsexual communities, including sex work, HIV/AIDS, access to medical resources, anglocentrism, and other problems in media and scholarship. In 2011, the book received a significantly longer second edition, expanding on many of the same issues and exploring new ones.

Namaste became an associate professor and the Research Chair in HIV/AIDS and Sexual Health at Concordia University in Montreal, Quebec, Canada. In 2009, she received the "Canadian Award for Action on HIV/AIDS and Human Rights", awarded jointly by the HIV Legal Network and Human Rights Watch.

In 2013, she was called as an official intervenor in a hearing at the Supreme Court of Canada on whether the ban on solicitation, prohibition of brothels and criminality of making a living from prostitution violates the Charter of Rights.

The feminist journal, Hypatia, has called Namaste's work, "extremely important".

== Bibliography ==
- 2000 · Invisible Lives: The Erasure of Transsexual and Transgendered People
- 2005 · Sex Change, Social Change: Reflections on Identity, Institutions, and Imperialism
- 2005 · C'était du spectacle! L'histoire des artistes transsexuelles à Montréal, 1955–1985
- 2012 · HIV Prevention and Bisexual Realities
- 2015 · Oversight
- 2017 · Imprimés interdits: La censure des journaux jaunes au Québec, 1955–1975
- 2019 · Thinking Differently about HIV/AIDS: Contributions from Critical Social Science
- 2019 · Savoirs créoles: Leçons du sida pour l'histoire de Montréal
