= In re Guardianship of Kowalski =

Case establishing a disabled lesbian's partner as her legal guardian

- Court: Minnesota Court of Appeals
- Full case name: In re Guardianship of Sharon Kowalski, Ward
- Citation: 478 N.W.2d 790
- Legislation cited: Minnesota Statutes §§ 525.551, 525.59

Case history
- Prior actions: Order appointing Donald Kowalski guardian (April 24, 1984); Minnesota Court of Appeals affirms, 382 N.W.2d 861 (March 4, 1986); Karen Tomberlin named successor guardian (April 23, 1991)

Court membership
- Judges sitting: Thomas Forsberg (Presiding Judge); Gary L. Crippen; Jack Davies (Associate Judges)

Case opinions
- When medical evidence establishes that a mentally incapacitated ward has the capacity to express a preference as to the identity of the ward's guardian, the trial court should give this preference great weight in its guardianship decision.
- Decision by: Davies

In re Guardianship of Kowalski, 478 N.W.2d 790 (Minn. Ct. App. 1991), is a Minnesota Court of Appeals case that established a lesbian's partner as her legal guardian after Sharon Kowalski became incapacitated following a traffic collision. Because the case was contested by Kowalski's parents and family and initially resulted in the partner being excluded for several years from visiting Kowalski, the gay community celebrated the final resolution in favor of the partner as a victory for gay rights.

== Facts and prior history ==
Sharon Kowalski, a high school teacher of physical education and health, lived with her partner, Karen Thompson (born 1947), in St. Cloud, Minnesota, for about four years. Although Kowalski's parents were not aware of the relationship at the time, the couple had exchanged rings and named one another as insurance policy beneficiaries. On November 13, 1983, Kowalski suffered severe brain injuries in an automobile accident involving a drunk driver. The injuries left Kowalski with permanent physical disabilities, requiring her to use a wheelchair, and impacting her intellectual capacities.

Sharon Kowalski's father, Donald Kowalski, petitioned to be named Sharon Kowalski's legal guardian in March 1984. With the understanding that she would have visitation rights, Thompson agreed that Donald Kowalski would be named Sharon Kowalski's guardian. The court's guardianship order, issued in July 1985, gave Donald complete control over visitation. On July 25, 1985, Donald cut off Thompson's visitation rights and moved Sharon from a nursing home near Thompson's home to one a five-hour drive away. Thompson appealed the order, but the appellate court initially affirmed the order, citing testimony by Sharon's family and nursing home staff that Sharon seemed depressed and sad after her visits with Thompson and postulating that it would be in Kowalski's best interest to discontinue Thompson's visits. However, the Kowalski family also engineered a more sinister justification, capitalizing on homophobic stereotypes of the era. In a letter to the court, the Kowalski's family physician wrote: "Visits by Karen Thompson at this time would expose Sharon Kowalski to a high risk of sexual abuse." The family believed that Thompson was a threat to their authority over their daughter, and refused to recognize that Sharon was gay and had previously been in a loving and committed relationship with Thompson. Donald Kowalski told an interviewer: "Karen Thompson kicked herself out of there by being so aggressive and by driving Sharon into a deep depression. She told Sharon she was being held prisoner, that she was in a dangerous environment. If you couldn't talk and you were lying there, wouldn't that put you in a depression?"

Several gay rights and civil liberties groups joined Thompson in her efforts to reestablish her visitation rights and acquire guardianship. Public awareness of the case was increased by local and international publicity, including fundraising concerts by lesbian singer and songwriter Ann Reed. Events in 21 cities marked "National Free Sharon Kowalski Day" in August 1988. Thomas B. Stoddard, executive director of the Lambda Legal, an LGBT gay rights advocacy group, commented: "there is no other case that approaches this one in symbolic importance.” He said the case "has touched the deepest nerve in the gay community across the United States because it triggers the two deepest fears of every gay person: a fight among loved ones and denial of personal wishes."

In May 1988, a federal judge asked specialists to conduct a study of Sharon to determine whether she had sufficient mental capacity to express her wishes with regard to visitation, and, if so, to determine what her wishes were. During that evaluation process, Thompson was allowed to visit Sharon for the first time in several years. The Miller-Dwan Medical Center specialists determined that Sharon did have the capacity to express her wishes, and based on their understanding of Sharon's wishes Thompson was allowed to resume limited visitation in January 1989. In March 1989, Thompson published a book about her experience with co-author Dr. Julie Andrzejewski, titled Why Can't Sharon Kowalski Come Home?

In late 1988, because of his deteriorating health, Donald Kowalski asked the court appoint a new guardian. Thompson filed an uncontested petition to be named Sharon's successor guardian in August 1989. A hearing on the petition was held in August 1990. Because a Kowalski family friend, Karen Tomberlin, had contacted Sharon's attorney requesting to testify against Thompson's guardianship, the court deferred consideration of Thompson's guardianship petition until it could conduct an evidentiary hearing. At that hearing, Thompson called sixteen medical witnesses who testified about Sharon's mental state, her interaction with Thompson, and her preference in regard to visitation. Three witnesses opposed to Thompson's guardianship— Sharon's sister, Tomberlin, and another family friend—also testified. Donald Kowalski told the court that he and his wife would not visit their daughter if Thompson became her guardian.

Judge Robert Campbell of the St. Louis County District Court in Duluth, Minnesota, denied Thompson's petition on April 19, 1991, and named Tomberlin as Sharon's guardian. He wrote that Thompson "has demonstrated commitment and devotion to the welfare of Sharon Kowalski" and that he recognized her contributions to Sharon's therapy and counseling and understanding of her "medical, material and social needs." He affirmed that Sharon Kowalski's own wish was to return to the home she had shared with Thompson: “In the past two years, when asked where she would like to live, Sharon has consistently said, 'St. Cloud with Karen.'" He counted against Thompson's petition her disclosure of Sharon's sexual orientation "to Sharon's parents and the world without Sharon's consent" and the fact that Thompson had established "other domestic partnerships" since Sharon's accident. Thomas B. Stoddard, executive director of the Lambda Legal Defense Fund, called the decision "a deep offense not only to all lesbians and gay men, but to all Americans who choose their partners and households by their own terms and not the legal rules imposed by society." He said: "Sharon chose her family. But the judge doesn't agree, so he imposed his own vision on her."

== The case ==
The Minnesota Court of Appeals ruled in Thompson's favor on December 17, 1991. Thompson attorney commented: "This seems to be the first guardianship case in the nation in which an appeals court recognized a homosexual partner's rights as tantamount to those of a spouse".

The court began its analysis by citing the applicable guardianship statutes, which provided that the court should make a guardianship decision based on the best interests of the ward. "Best interests of the ward" is defined in the statute, but requires the court to consider the reasonable preference of the ward or conservatee if a preference can be determined.

With the statute in mind, the court stated that Sharon Kowalski has stated a clear preference for Thompson to be her guardian, citing the study by the Miller-Dwan specialists. The court noted that the three witnesses opposed to Thompson's appointment were all lay witnesses with no medical training. In regard to Thompson's qualifications to serve as a guardian, the court stated that testimony from multiple witnesses established that Thompson had been loving and caring when dealing with Sharon and was able to take care of her on a day-to-day basis. Finally, the court addressed the lower court's concern that Thompson was involving Sharon in multiple gay and lesbian public events–the case had generated considerable media attention–that her family testified she might not otherwise choose to attend. The court said that the lower court's reliance on this in its guardianship decision was misguided, as the record indicated that Sharon enjoyed these events and even received an award at a National Organization for Women meeting.

The court concluded that while a trial court has wide discretion in guardianship proceedings, the court abused its discretion in this case in denying Thompson's petition against the weight of evidence. It removed Tomberlin from Sharon Kowalski's guardianship and appointed Thompson in her place. It said: "All the medical testimony established that Sharon has the capacity reliably to express a preference in this case, and she has clearly chosen to return home with Thompson if possible. This choice is further supported by the fact that Thompson and Sharon are a family of affinity, which ought to be accorded respect."

== Effects of the decision ==
The Kowalski decision was viewed as a victory for gay rights by the gay community. The American Bar Association's Journal reported the decision under the heading: "Gay-Rights Victory: Minnesota woman named guardian of her disabled lesbian lover".

A video, Lifetime Commitment: A Portrait of Karen Thompson, was produced in 1994, and three plays have been based on Kowalski's case. The case also highlighted the importance of durable power of attorney and other legal strategies for homosexual couples wishing to establish guardianship rights in comparable situations.

The first Disability Pride Parade in the United States was held in Boston in 1990, and the featured speaker was Karen Thompson.

Karen Thompson received several awards for her work to achieve LGBT equality, including 2012, "100 Women We Love" from GO Magazine, the Liberty Award from Lambda Legal Defense and Education Fund, and the 1989 Annual Humanitarian Award from the American Psychological Association. Together Thompson and Sharon Kowalski received the 1990 Woman of Courage Award from the National Organization for Women, the 1991 Feminist of the Year Award from the Feminist Majority Foundation, and a 1990 Creating Change Award from the National Gay and Lesbian Task Force. As of 2013, Thompson was still making public appearances to discuss the case and the issues it raised.

== Death ==
Kowalski died on October 1, 2023.
