= Angela Lynn Douglas =

Transsexual activist and musician

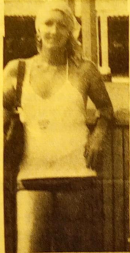
- Born: 1943; Detroit, Michigan, U.S.
- Died: 2007 (aged 63–64)
- Other name: Angela Keyes Douglas
- Occupations: Activist, journalist, musician
- Known for: Transgender activist, founder of the Transsexual Action Organization.

Angela Lynn Douglas (1943–2007) was an American transgender activist and guitarist. She was a trans woman who performed as a rock musician and was a prominent pioneering figure in trans activism during the 1970s. She founded the Transsexual Action Organization (TAO), the first international trans organization. She wrote articles about the state of trans politics at the time for the Berkeley Barb, The Advocate, the Bay Area Reporter, Come Out! and Everywoman, in addition to TAO's Mirage magazine and Moonshadow Bulletin. She expressed racist attitudes at various points in her life, and at one point became active with the Nazi party.

== Early life ==
Douglas was born in Detroit in March 1943. Her father, Charles Joseph Czinky Jr., son of Hungarian immigrants was in Air Force Intelligence and her mother, Deloris Coffey, was a folk singer in The Coffey Trio. Douglas would claim that she had her first UFO sighting at the age of 13 vacationing in Traverse City, likely being related to her later life paranormal interests, paranoia and other mental health struggles. She went to Hialeah High School, where she met her future wife Norma Arcadia Rodríguez. In 1962, she married Rodríguez despite her family's objections, and in 1965 the couple moved to Los Angeles. There, under the stage name Doug Delain, Douglas played guitar, first with local band Euphoria with William D. Lincoln, Hamilton Wesley Watt and Dave Potter, and later with Warren Zevon, and also with Love's Ken Forssi and Alban Pfisterer, recording songs together. In 1966-1967, Rodríguez, pregnant, left Douglas to pursue a lesbian relationship with a woman named Joan Black.

== Early activism ==
In 1969, Douglas came out as a trans woman and through a job in Los Angeles Image newspaper she became active in the LA Gay Liberation Front. She left in 1970 due to reluctance of gay men within the GLF to associate with trans people, and the fact they failed to support the campaign for a trans healthcare clinic in Los Angeles.

The Advocate published the headline "Gay Lib survives bitch fit", detailing her departure from the GLF to found the TAO while misgendering her. She later wrote for the same magazine in 1973 to defend Sylvia Rivera, critiquing her exclusion from the mainstream gay rights movement and trans people's exclusion from Pride. She denounced the "attacks on transsexualism and transvestism made by lesbian feminist leaders, such as Jean O'Leary", and concluded the piece by stating "it is encouraging to find so many transsexuals and transvestites willing to tear down the crosses which were used to burn and crucify Joan of Arc and Christine Jorgensen, among countless others, and beat their oppressors over the head with them."

== Transsexual Action Organization ==
=== Los Angeles (1970–1972) ===
In 1970, Douglas formed the Transsexual and Transvestite Action Organization (TAO, later Transsexual Action Organization) to amplify and support trans people and their struggles. It was originally headquartered in Los Angeles. One of the early members was Canary Conn, who quickly became disillusioned with the organization and left.

The TAO was a radical and militant organization, calling for confrontational protests and street demonstrations. Early actions included blocking the entrance to a showing of the film Myra Breckinridge to protest the movie's portrayal of a trans woman played by a cisgender actress, and protesting Los Angeles welfare officials' refusal to continue aid to "men dressed as women".

In 1970, the TAO persuaded the Californian Peace and Freedom Party to include "the right to determine the uses of one's body, as in sex changes operations and others" in its platform and the Socialist Workers Party to denounce arrests for "cross-dressing."

As part of the more radical "second wave" of transgender activism, the organization spoke out against sexism, worked with women's liberation groups, and maintained contact with the GLF. In a letter to Playboy Magazine, she wrote the TAO supported "both gay liberation and women's liberation: we believe that all victims of prejudice and discrimination must work together to change this society." In addition to material fights, the group appealed to and cited extraterrestrial support.

Douglas announced the TAO would no longer support the Black Panther Party due to its refusal to respond to the concerns of lesbians and sexism at the Revolutionary People's Constitutional Convention at Temple University in Philadelphia in September 1970.

In 1971, TAO was renamed to the Transsexual Action Organization, stating some transsexuals call themselves transvestites for simplicity but distinguishing transsexuals as those who live as they are permanently and transvestites who dress up temporarily then resume living as a man.

The same year, Douglas was arrested for "cross-dressing" in Miami. The judge dismissed the charge, labeling it a "bad arrest", but did not rule on the ordinance's constitutionality.

=== Miami (1972–1978) ===
The cover of Moonshadow: The Voice of the Transexual Action Organization from September 1973

In 1972, Douglas moved to Miami to set up another branch of TAO with Collete Tisha Goudie, Tara Carn, and Kimberly Elliot. This branch focused heavily on police brutality towards trans women and set up a "security force" to publicize arrests, beatings, and sexual abuses of trans people by the police force.

Douglas also organized and published the newsletter Moonshadow and the magazine Mirage, which reported on the TAO's activism and national news concerning trans people; it was printed from 1972 to 1980.

When the American Psychiatric Association removed homosexuality as a diagnosis in 1973, TAO called on it to delist transsexualism as well.

However, Douglas began making stranger accusations, such as that the CIA had set up the Johns Hopkins gender clinic and was working with the Erickson Educational Foundation, a group she criticized for focusing too heavily on assimilation.

Dr. John Ronald Brown offered Mirage several thousand dollars in exchange for public promotion of him, which Douglas accepted.

TAO broke off relations with Gay Activists Alliance of Miami after the group refused to include transsexuals in a lawsuit countering police brutality in Miami Beach.

In 1973, TAO made news in gay press for placing a hex on anti-trans feminist Robin Morgan, following exclusion of trans singer Beth Elliott from The Lesbian Feminist Conference.

In 1974, Douglas stepped down as TAO's president, with Barbara Rosello taking over the organization. At the time, TAO had begun to include more trans men and had chapters in San Francisco, Philadelphia, Chicago, Atlanta, Orlando, Jacksonville, Miami Beach, and even abroad in England, Canada, and Northern Ireland.

In 1976 Douglas moved to Berkeley, formally disbanding the TAO in 1978.

== Later life ==
In 1977, Douglas wrote a satirical letter to the lesbian journal Sister about how transsexual women were superior to cisgender women and would replace them when technology and medical science allowed trans women to give birth in response to the firing of Sandy Stone from Olivia Records. This was quoted as serious evidence that trans women hated cis women by Janice Raymond in The Transsexual Empire, which led to critiques of intellectual dishonesty for misquoting.

Due to her popularity as a rock musician and writer, she faced a lot of speculation about her surgical transition, which was completed by John Ronald Brown in 1977. However, she said the results left her mutilated and helped get him arrested.

In 1978, Stan Grossman with Newcastle Publishing Company profited off of featuring her in an X-rated magazine, using erotic photos of her pre- and post-operation, without paying her any royalties. Douglas attempted to sue him, but the results are unknown.

Between 1978 and 1979, Douglas became an active participant in US Nazi politics and espoused extremely racist views, later suggesting her far-right shift was caused by mind control by her enemies.

In 1982, Douglas detransitioned. In 1991, after winning $232,567 in a lottery game, she retransitioned to living as Angela and moved to Palm Beach, Florida. In 1992, she ran out of money, and after suffering a stroke, was reported to have continued a "sort of transitioned, sort of detransitioned" life.

Douglas also self-published the autobiographies Triple Jeopardy: The Autobiography of Angela Lynn Douglas in 1983 and Hollywood's Obsession in 1992, where she claimed that most representations of trans people in the media were based on her life. Historical accounts note a degradation in her mental health as she aged, claiming in Triple Jeopardy that her friend Randy Towers was a "reptilian, transsexual ET" who'd come to earth to "aid human transsexuals" and that Angela Davis spent years impersonating Douglas.

Douglas used racist and sexualizing language toward Black and Latino people. In Triple Jeopardy, Douglas presented herself as someone who challenged her family members' racist conceptions. However, her depictions of Rodriguez were highly sexualized, and she commented that Rodriguez was "intelligent despite being Cuban". Douglas stated life for transsexuals in jail is similar to the outside world since "the most ignorant black, Latin, or anyone is still above us and can control our lives to a great extent, with the full weight of a sexist, callous Society and legal system on their side."

In the early 2000s, Douglas released solo albums under the name Last Drop Douglas.

In 2007, Douglas died from heart complications.
