= Wrong-body narrative =

Transsexuality theory

The wrong-body narrative (WBN) is a framework for understanding transsexuality that posits a misalignment between an individual's gender identity and their physical body. According to this narrative, trans individuals are seen as being "trapped in the wrong body", meaning that their innate gender identity does not match their assigned sex.

The wrong-body narrative emerged from the fields of sexology, medicine, and psychiatry and has been influential in shaping both medical and social understandings of transsexuality. However, it has been critiqued for its pathologizing aspects and for reinforcing binary notions of gender, as well as for failing to fully account for the diverse experiences of trans individuals, particularly those who do not fit neatly into the categories of "man" or "woman".

== Overview ==
The wrong-body framework traces its scientific origins to 19th-century sexology, notably with Karl Ulrichs' concept of the Urning—a "female soul in a male body." This dualistic view was later solidified in the mid-20th century by endocrinologist Harry Benjamin, whose 1966 book The Transsexual Phenomenon helped establish the first clinical protocols. By 1980, the American Psychiatric Association codified this into the DSM-III as transsexualism, later renamed gender identity disorder (GID) in 1994. These diagnoses required patients to demonstrate a persistent wrong-body narrative to qualify for care.

== Analysis ==
In her 1987 essay "The Empire Strikes Back: A Posttranssexual Manifesto", Sandy Stone suggests that the wrong-body narrative is problematic because it reduces the multifaceted experiences of transsexuals to a single, reductive story. This narrative is often perpetuated by both the medical establishment and transsexuals themselves, as it aligns with the criteria required for accessing gender-affirming surgery, which demands a clear, binary transition from one gender to another. In contrast, Stone calls for a language that can better capture the lived realities of transsexuals, moving beyond binary and essentialist assumptions.

According to Talia Mae Bettcher, this model has two primary versions: in the weak version, transsexuality is considered a medical condition where a person is born with a misaligned body. Through gender-affirming surgery, the person becomes aligned with their innate gender identity, effectively transitioning to a man or a woman. In the strong version, a person's real sex is determined solely by their gender identity. In this view, a trans person has always truly been the gender they identify with, regardless of their body. Bettcher critiques the wrong-body narrative for its reliance on dominant understandings of sex and gender, but argues that it can be seen as a form of resistance to transphobic attempts of reality enforcement. Ultimately, she advocates for a framework that moves beyond the wrong-body model by recognizing multiple meanings of gender and validating trans identities outside of medicalized narratives.

Andrea Long Chu critiques the wrong-body narrative by highlighting its sensationalization rather than its so-called essentialism. She discusses how trans autobiographies, particularly Juliet Jacques’s Trans: A Memoir, challenge the traditional wrong-body framework by presenting transition not as a heroic journey from dysphoria to alignment but as a mundane, bureaucratic, and often frustrating process. Chu acknowledges that while Jacques is critical of the wrong-body narrative, she also relies on its rhetoric at times, using phrases like “male in body but female in spirit.” However, Jacques ultimately reframes her experience, stating that she felt “not trapped in the wrong body but trapped in the wrong society.” For Chu, this statement directs attention to the ways in which societal structures make trans lives difficult, rather than focusing solely on bodily misalignment.

== See also ==
- Causes of gender incongruence
- Feminist metaphysics
- Gender policing
- Postgenderism
- Transfeminism
