= Trans/Rad/Fem =

2025 transfeminist book by Talia Bhatt

- First edition cover
- Author: Talia Bhatt
- Language: English
- Series: Essays on Transfeminism
- Subject: Transfeminism
- Publisher: Self-published
- Publication date: 24 January 2025
- Pages: 166
- Awards: Transfeminine Review Reader's Choice Award for nonfiction
- ISBN: 9798306921891
- Followed by: Brown/Trans/Les
- Website: https://taliabhattwrites.substack.com/

Trans/Rad/Fem: Essays on Transfeminism is a 2025 collection of transfeminist essays by Talia Bhatt, originally posted to her Substack. The book argues for a transgender reclamation of radical feminism and a deconstruction of third gender tropes. It won the 2025 Transfeminine Review Reader's Choice Award for nonfiction.

== Background ==
Bhatt published the first essay of what would become Trans/Rad/Fem in December of 2023, though she would later state that she did "closer to five" years worth of reading for the book. She continued publishing the essays throughout the writing of the book, and attributed the book's eventual success to one of them, "The Third Sex," becoming popular on the social media platform Bluesky. She finished writing the essays with "The Question Has an Answer" on 13 January 2025 and published the book on 24 January 2025.

== Synopsis ==
=== Fundamentals ===
The book's first part, "Fundamentals," begins with a description of the author's experiences as a trans woman of color. She then argues for a systemic understanding of misogyny and patriarchy and describes how they are inherently connected to heterosexuality. She also discusses how women's subjugation and dehumanization is rationalized through a process she calls misogynistic socialization. Bhatt then elucidates gendering as a violent, socially constructed process.

Transmisogyny is then defined as an "intensification of misogyny," a force which makes an example of those who reject manhood. Bhatt describes how the patriarchal system sees trans women as both failed men and failed women, "the union of the fag and the whore." Specifically, this also includes a refusal to identify the subject of transmisogyny as a woman at all, instead ejecting her from the gender binary entirely.

=== Lesbian Feminism ===
The book's second part, "Lesbian Feminism," discusses lesbian feminism and lesbophobia. Lesbophobia is described as arising from lesbians' refusal to participate in the heterosexual patriarchal system, and the inability of the system to extract domestic labor from them, necessitating violence to force them back into the subjugated position assigned to women. The Japanese Class S genre and Midge Decter's essay The Beast with Two Backs are used as examples, discussing how romance between women is seen as merely a play-act or rehearsal, while relationships are viewed as really being "by, for, and about men."

An analogy is also made to Karel Čapek's play R.U.R., comparing the robots' drudgery with the domestic labour expected of women, and arguing that women's subjugation is even more absolute, as patriarchy demands women be "in love with [their] own abjection." Bhatt also discusses Stone Butch Blues, and how its narrative, despite being about a butch rather than a trans woman, reveals the ways in which patriarchal oppression affects both, and how important trans women are to lesbian history.

=== Interlude ===
The book's interlude discusses the ways in which trans women are silenced, and especially the ways in which those from the Third World are prevented from discussing their own oppression. Bhatt rejects ideas of Western liberal feminism which view non-Western cultures as inherently progressive and how this is used to excuse the ways in which many such cultures remain intensely patriarchal and silence those who would criticize such cultures. The interlude concludes with a declaration from Bhatt that women like her matter, and that she will not stop speaking for them.

=== Epistemicide ===
The third and final part of the book, "Epistemicide," discusses bioessentialist ideas of sex and deconstructs the common gender-conservative refrains of "sex matters" and "sex is real." It instead proffers a materialist view of sex that rejects the essentialist ideas represented by these phrases. Bhatt also analyzes the way trans people are portrayed in Janice Raymond's The Transsexual Empire, noting that "the modern liberal-feminist progressive ... is now less willing to admit that transsexual people do in fact change their sex than Janice Raymond was in her Transmisogyny Bible."

Bhatt then discusses the hijra community and the various ethnographical works that have been published about them, focusing on how these works Orientalize them. She accuses such works of ignoring hijra's femininity, noting how, while hijra are quite clear about not being men, the evidence for them not being women is limited to claims they fail to embody ideal Hindu femininity, 18th century legal codes, and their inability to carry children. She also discusses how these and other third-sexed communities are contrasted with the supposedly medicalized Western transgender community, and argues that this is primarily due to a difference in access to medical care rather than meaningful differences between the communities.

=== Conclusion ===
In her conclusion, Bhatt discusses liberal feminism and how it fails actually address the root causes of misogyny, focusing on individual choice and contract law rather than structural misogyny and the ways women are coerced into obedience. She advocates instead for radical feminism, stating that it is the only way to actually confront patriarchy and misogyny. She concludes by discussing the transphobic arguments over the definition of a woman, arguing that they are not primarily an actual attempt to provide a definition, but instead a tool for policing gender.

== Reception ==
In an article on the book, published in Women's Studies, Yanyan Zhu praised it, saying "Bhatt's compelling analysis exposes how gender is not merely an identity but a system of labor extraction." She also expressed appreciation for the book's combination of theory and personal narrative, writing, "Talia Bhatt blends personal narrative and theoretical rigor to produce a transfeminism that is intellectually formidable and politically urgent." She also stated that the book was "scathing" and "incendiary" in its approach to transmisogyny and epistemicide.

The Transfeminine Review, a publication dedicated to transfeminine literature, placed Trans/Rad/Fem on their suggested reading list for readers interested in transfeminism, stating that "[w]hile the competition may be stiff for the best book of 2025, there's a serious argument to be made that Trans/Rad/Fem is the most important." They also predicted the book would become a major piece of transfeminist literature, calling it "a crucial new cornerstone text for transfeminism as a discipline."

The book also received The Transfeminine Review 2025 Reader's Choice Award for nonfiction. It was stated to be a "generation-defining manifesto" and "the book we needed this year." It was also called "the single most popular work of transfeminist theory since ... 2007" and won the vote in the largest blowout in the history of The Transfeminine Review.

== Sequel ==
A sequel, Brown/Trans/Les, was published on 26 January 2026.

== See also ==
- The Empire Strikes Back: A Posttranssexual Manifesto – Foundational essay in transgender studies
- Whipping Girl – 2007 book on transgender issues by Julia Serano
