= Transfeminism =

Branch of feminism

A symbol used to represent transfeminism

Transfeminism, or trans feminism, is a branch of feminism focused on transgender women and informed by transgender studies. Transfeminism focuses on the effects of transmisogyny and patriarchy on trans women. It is related to the broader field of queer theory. The term was popularized by Emi Koyama with the ISNA in The Transfeminist Manifesto.

Transfeminism describes the concepts of gender nonconformity, notions of masculinity and femininity and the maintaining of the gender binary on gender diverse individuals. Transfeminists view gender conformity as a control mechanism which is maintained via violence against transgender and gender-nonconforming individuals as a basis for patriarchy and transmisogyny.

Transfeminist tactics emerged from groups such as The Transexual Menace in the 1990s, in response to the exclusion of transgender people in pride marches. The group organized in direct action, focusing on violence against transgender people, such as the murder and rape of Brandon Teena, a trans man. The Transsexual Menace organized protests and sit ins against the medical and mental medicalization of gender diversity.

Transgender people were excluded from first-wave feminism, as were lesbians and all other people considered "queer." Second-wave feminism saw a greater level of queer acceptance amongst some feminists, however "transsexuality" was heavily excluded, and described as an "illness," even amongst feminists who supported gay liberation. Third and fourth-wave feminism have generally been accepting of transgender people, and see trans liberation as an overall part of women's liberation.

In 2006, the first book on transfeminism, Trans/Forming Feminisms: Transfeminist Voices Speak Out edited by Krista Scott-Dixon, was published by Sumach Press. Transfeminism has also been defined more generally as "an approach to feminism that is informed by trans politics."

== History ==
Early voices in the movement include Kate Bornstein, author of 1994 Gender Outlaw: On Men, Women, and the Rest of Us, and Sandy Stone, author of the 1987 essay "The Empire Strikes Back: A Posttranssexual Manifesto", which included a direct response to Janice Raymond's writings on transsexuality. At the beginning of the 21st century, Emi Koyama published the Transfeminist Manifesto and later a website. Krista Scott-Dixon and Julia Serano have published transfeminist works, and in 2016, Susan Stryker and Talia Mae Bettcher produced a special issue of Transgender Studies Quarterly dedicated to transfeminism.

Patrick Califia used the term transfeminism in print in 1997, and this remains the first known use in print outside of a periodical. It is possible or even likely that the term was independently coined repeatedly before the year 2000 (or even before Courvant's first claimed use in 1992). The term gained traction only after 1999. Jessica Xavier, an acquaintance of Courvant, may have independently coined the term when she used it to introduce her articles, "Passing As Stigma Management" and "Passing as Privilege" in late 1999.

In the past few decades, the idea that all women share a common experience has come under scrutiny by women of color, lesbians, and working class women, among others. Transfeminists insist that their unique experiences be recognized as part of the feminist sphere. More recently, transgender people have been questioning what gender means, and challenging it as a concept.

Transfeminism incorporates all the major themes of third-wave feminism, including diversity, body image, self-definition, and women's agency. It also includes critical analysis of second-wave feminism from the perspective of the third wave. It critiques mainstream notions of masculinity, argues that women deserve equal rights, and shares the unifying principle with other feminisms that gender is a patriarchal social construct used to oppress women.

The "trans" in transgender has been used to imply transgressiveness. Nicholas Birns categorizes transfeminism as "a feminism that defines the term 'trans-' in a maximally heterogeneous way."

The road to legitimacy for transfeminism as a concept has been different and more challenging than for other feminisms. Marginalized women from gender-diverse backgrounds have had to prove that their needs are uniquely different and not included in mainstream feminism. Contrarily, trans women must show their womanhood is equally as valid as other women, and that feminism can speak for them without ceasing to be feminism. Radical feminist Janice Raymond clearly represents this obstacle through her resistance to considering trans women as women that should be included in feminism. Her career began with The Transsexual Empire, a book-length analysis of transsexual women, which has themes she often returns to.

In 2006, the first book on transfeminism, Trans/Forming Feminisms: Transfeminist Voices Speak Out edited by Krista Scott-Dixon, was published by Sumach Press.

At the 2007 Transgender Leadership Summit, Alexis Marie Rivera, spoke about her personal experiences with transfeminism as a young Latina trans woman. She discussed her journey from early transition, where she believed she had to take on the role of housewife, to where she was in the present moment. She asserted that, for her, transfeminism is about taking on feminine gender roles because she wants to, not because she has to.

== Compared to other feminisms ==
=== Common foundations ===
Simone de Beauvoir explained the concept of how biology does not equal destiny. Feminists have traditionally explored the boundaries of what it means to be a woman. Transfeminists argue that trans people and cisgender feminists confront society's conventional views of sex and gender in similar ways. Transgender liberation theory offers a new vantage point from which feminism can view gender as a social construct, under a new definition of gender.

Transfeminist critics of mainstream feminism say that as an institutionalized movement, feminism has lost sight of the basic idea that biology is not destiny. In fact, they argue that many feminists seem perfectly comfortable equating sex and gender, while insisting on a given destiny for trans people based on nothing more than biology. Transfeminism aims to resist and challenge this rigid perspective on gender because traditional approaches to women's studies depend upon these concepts.

Transgender people are frequently targets of violence. While cis women also routinely face violence, transfeminists recognize anti-trans violence as a form of gender policing.

=== Differences ===
Transfeminism stands in stark contrast to mainstream second-wave feminism. Participants of this movement often criticize the ideas of a universal sisterhood, instead aligning more with intersectionality and the mainstream third wave's appreciation for the diversity of womanhood.

Femininity in transgender women is noticed and punished much more harshly than the same behaviors in cisgender women. This double standard reveals that, to many critics, the behavior itself is not as problematic as the mere existence of trans people is. This is one example of transmisogyny, a term coined by Julia Serano in her book Whipping Girl.

==== Access to feminist spaces ====
Though rarely acknowledged, trans people have unintentionally been part of feminist movements in unconventional ways throughout history. There have been a number of documented occasions when the trans people portrayed as bad actors were in fact the victims of overreactions by others.

==== Lesbian feminism and transfeminism ====
In Living a Feminist Life (2017), Sara Ahmed imagines lesbian feminism as a fundamental and necessary alliance with trans feminism. Ahmed argues an anti-trans stance is an anti-feminist stance and one that works against the feminist project of creating worlds to support those for whom gender fatalism (i.e. boys will be boys, girls will be girls) is deleterious.

==== Radical feminism and transfeminism ====
Some radical feminists have expressed anti-trans viewpoints. For example, in Gender Hurts (2014), Sheila Jeffreys argued that trans feminism amounted to men exercising their authority in defining what women are.

Some radical feminists are supportive of trans rights. The radical feminist writer and activist Andrea Dworkin, in her book Woman Hating, argued against the persecution and hatred of transgender people and demanded that sex reassignment surgery be provided freely to transgender people by the community. Dworkin argued that "every transsexual has the right to survival on his/her own terms. That means every transsexual is entitled to a sex-change operation, and it should be provided by the community as one of its functions."

===== Allegations of transphobia in radical feminism =====
Radical feminist Janice Raymond's 1979 book, The Transsexual Empire, was and still is controversial due to its unequivocal condemnation of transgender surgeries. Raymond says, "All transsexuals rape women's bodies by reducing the real female form to an artifact, appropriating this body for themselves .... Transsexuals merely cut off the most obvious means of invading women, so that they seem non-invasive."

In the early 1990s Michigan Womyn's Music Festival ejected a transgender woman, Nancy Burkholder, After that, the festival maintained that it is intended for "womyn-born-womyn" only. The activist group Camp Trans formed to protest the transphobic "womyn-born-womyn" policy and to advocate for greater acceptance of trans people within the feminist community. A number of prominent trans activists and transfeminists were involved in Camp Trans including Riki Wilchins, Jessica Xavier, and Leslie Feinberg. The festival considered allowing post-operative trans women to attend; however, this was criticized as classist, as many trans women cannot afford genital surgery. After this incident, the Michigan Womyn's Music Festival updated their community statements page. The page included a list of links to letters and statements such as their August 2014 response to Equality Michigan's Call For Boycott and a list of demands in response to the Equality Michigan call to boycott. The initial response to the boycott stated that the MWMF believes that "support for womyn-born-female space is not at odds with standing with and for the transgender community".

Kimberly Nixon is a trans woman who volunteered for training as a rape crisis counselor at Vancouver Rape Relief in Vancouver, British Columbia, in 1995. When Nixon's transgender status was determined, she was expelled. The staff decided that Nixon's status made it impossible for her to understand the experiences of their clients, and also required their clients to be genetically female. Nixon disagreed, disclosing her own history of partner abuse and sued for discrimination. Nixon's attorneys argued that there was no basis for the dismissal, citing Diana Courvant's experiences as the first publicly transgender woman to work in a women-only domestic violence shelter. In 2007, the Canadian Supreme Court refused to hear Nixon's appeal, ending the case.

Transgender women such as Sandy Stone challenged the mainstream second-wave feminist concept of "biological woman". Stone worked as a sound engineer for Olivia Records from around 1974 to 1978. In June and July 1977, twenty two feminists protested Stone's participation, Olivia Records defended her employment by saying that Stone was a "woman we can related to with comfort and trust" and that she was "perhaps even the Goddess-sent engineering wizard we had so long sought." The debate continued in Raymond's book, which devoted a chapter to criticism of "the transsexually constructed lesbian-feminist." Stone ultimately chose to resign because of the controversy in addition to death threats from a lesbian separatist group who showed up armed to a Seattle concert.

Groups like Lesbian Organization of Toronto (L.O.O.T) instituted "womyn-born womyn only" policies. A formal request to join the organization was made by a male-to-female transgender lesbian in 1978. In response, they passed a vote to exclude trans women. During informal discussion, members of L.O.O.T expressed their outrage that in their view, a "sex-change he-creature...dared to identify himself as a woman and a lesbian." In their public response, L.O.O.T. wrote:

A woman's voice was almost never heard as a woman's voice—it was always filtered through men's voices. So here a guy comes along saying, "I'm going to be a girl now and speak for girls." And we thought, "No you're not." A person cannot just joined the oppressed by fiat.

===== Radical transfeminism =====
Some transgender women have been participants in lesbian feminism and radical feminism.

In 2017, Nat Raha and Mijke van der Drift co-edited the Radical Transfeminism Zine, released in Edinburgh. Raha and van der Drift later published Trans Femme Futures: Abolitionist Ethics for Transfeminist Worlds. In both works, the writers explore transfeminism's potential to enable radical societal transformation via mutual aid and collective solidarity.

Talia Bhatt's 2025 Trans/Rad/Fem engages with second-wave literature and lesbian feminist arguments to articulate how gender is a system of labor extraction. She also critiques the individualist tendencies of liberal feminism which fail to challenge structural violence.

== Issues faced by transfeminism ==
=== Inclusion in mainstream feminism ===
According to Graham Mayeda, women who identify as right-wing feel that issues of equality and female importance becomes less significant when the biology of trans women is mentioned. He noted that these feminists feel that the biological nature of trans women confuse women-only boundaries and could contradict or disrupt feminist goals of establishing a voice in a patriarchal world.

Groups such as the Lesbian Avengers accept trans women, while other organizations reject them. The Violence Against Women Act now "explicitly protects transgender, lesbian, gay, and bisexual survivors", such that domestic violence centers, rape crisis centers, support groups, and other VAWA-funded services cannot turn away any person due to their sex, gender identity or expression, or sexual orientation.

=== Classification of gender dysphoria ===
Gender dysphoria describes the condition of people who experience significant dysphoria with the sex assignment that they were given at birth, or the gender roles associated with that sex. The term "gender identity disorder" (GID) is also frequently used, especially in the formal diagnosis used amongst psychologists and physicians. Gender Identity Disorder was officially classified as a medical disorder by the ICD-10 CM in 2016 and the DSM-4-TR in 2000. As the language around these terms has evolved, the DSM-5 now uses a less pathologizing term gender dysphoria, while the ICD-11 uses the term gender incongruence. Many transgender individuals, transfeminists, and medical researchers advocate against the use of the term GID because they say it misrepresents gender variance, reinforces the binary model of gender, and can result in stigmatization of transgender individuals. Many transfeminists and traditional feminists also propose that this diagnosis be discarded because of its potentially abusive use by people with power, and may argue that gender variation is the right of all persons. When arguing for the previous diagnostic category, pro-GID transfeminists typically concede past misuse of the diagnosis while arguing for greater professional accountability.

In many situations or legal jurisdictions, transgender people have insurance coverage for surgery only as a consequence of the diagnosis. Removal would therefore increase patient costs. In other situations, anti-discrimination laws which protect legally disabled people apply to transgender people only so long as a manifest diagnosis exists. In other cases, transgender people are protected by sex discrimination rules or as a separate category. This economic issue can split advocates along class lines.

At the 2006 Trans Identity Conference at the University of Vermont, Courvant presented an analysis of this controversy. She noted that "eliminationists" must decide whether their efforts to destigmatize trans people conflict with efforts to destigmatize mental illness, and whether removing the GID category would actually help with the former, while disrupting the current, albeit limited, insurance regime. Conversely, "preservationists" must address the problem of faulty diagnoses and improper treatment. She proposed retaining the category and focusing efforts on legitimating mental illness and improving acceptance of trans people, leaving aside the diagnosis question.

=== Gender and social constructionism ===
Citing their common experience, many transfeminists directly challenge the idea that femininity is an entirely social construction. Instead, they view gender as a multifaceted set of diverse intrinsic and social qualities. For example, there are both trans and cis people who express themselves in ways that differ from society's expectations of feminine and masculine.

Talia Mae Bettcher states in her 2014 essay Trapped in the Wrong Theory that "while the actual appeal to native gender must be rejected from a transfeminist perspective, the socially constituted denial of realness must be taken with dead seriousness."

Some decolonial trans feminists identify the gender binary as an aspect of Western epistemology and tool of colonial power. Integrating knowledge and experiences from muxe, hijra, faʻafafine, two-spirit, and other indigenous third gender systems into trans feminist thought counters both individualist and universalizing conceptualization of gender. However, other transfeminist writers critique this view as a form of orientalism, pointing out that these non-western third gender systems have their own patriarchal and oppressive characteristics that western observers tend to ignore.

=== Intersectional transphobia and misogyny ===
In Julia Serano's 2007 essay Trans-misogyny primer, she explains how trans women face the compounded effects of both transphobia and misogyny. Further research shows a stark disparity in how gender non-conformity is policed and perceived between the sexes. Femininity in people assigned male at birth is punished more harshly than masculinity in those assigned female at birth. This is due to the societal devaluation of femininity, often referred to as femmephobia. Rhea Ashley in her journal about the topic explains how femininity is seen as low-value trait when compared to masculinity. She also notes that femmephobia is rooted in discrimination against femininity itself, rather than a person's identity. Trans feminists point to this as being one of the reasons why feminism needs to include transgender identities for a complete liberation of all feminine expressions.

== See also ==
- Feminism movements and ideologies
- Feminist views on transgender topics
- Fourth-wave feminism
- Heteropatriarchy
- Heterosexism
- Transmisogyny
- List of transgender-related topics
- Queer theory
