= Vidaurre =

Vidaurre may refer to:

== People ==
- Antonio Vidaurre (1724–1780), Spanish painter, poet and writer
- José Antonio Vidaurre (1798–1837), Chilean military officer who led a failed insurrection in 1837
- José Milla y Vidaurre (1822–1882), Guatemalan writer
- Violeta Vidaurre (1928–2021), Chilean actress

== Geography ==
- Vidaurre Rock, a rock which breaks the surface at low water east of Acuna Rocks in the Duroch Islands, Trinity Peninsula

== See also ==
- Estadio Carlos Vidaurre García, a multi-use stadium in Tarapoto, Peru
- Estadio Municipal Carlos Vidaurre García, a multi-use stadium in Tarapoto, Peru
- Vadaure, Nepal
- Vidarte, a surname
- Vidura, a character in the Mahabharata
