= Carol Riddell =

British feminist and socialist

Carol S. Riddell is a British feminist and socialist sociologist and transgender lesbian who was active in the UK Women's liberation movement in the 1970s. She is known for authoring Divided Sisterhood, the first feminist critique of Janice Raymond's book The Transsexual Empire.

== Career ==
Riddell was a radical professor of sociology at Lancaster University and taught women's studies in the United States. She co-authored a well-received sociology textbook with Margaret Coulson. Riddell was active in the Women's Liberation Movement in the 1970s and a member of the International Marxist Group. She was also a member of the Lancaster Socialist Woman Group and was involved with the Lancaster Primrose Street Women's Centre. She presented papers at Women's Lib and Socialist feminist conferences, contributed to Spare Rib and the Merseyside Women's Paper, and played keyboard in the Northern Women's Liberation Rock Band.

In 1972, Riddell presented the paper "Transvestism and the Tyranny of Gender", which characterized the gender binary as an oppressive feature of capitalism, to the National Deviancy Conference; her work influenced Richard Ekins and David King, leading researchers of transgender phenomena in the 1980s through 1990s. In the paper, Riddell called for transvestite and transsexuals to join "with other sexually persecuted minorities, particularly, homosexuals, in confrontation with the police, the legal profession, the psychiatrists, the capitalist nuclear family, capitalist gender roles, capitalist attitudes, and fundamentally the capitalist system itself".

In 1980, The Women's Press published a UK edition of Janice Raymond's book The Transsexual Empire, which has first been published in the United States and portrayed trans feminists as interlopers in the women's movement. The Merseyside Women's Paper asked Riddell to review the book, introducing the review by suggesting there was an "obvious hatred of transsexual lesbian feminists" in it and noting it gave "hardly any space" to trans voices.

The same year, she published an early transfeminist text and first feminist critique of the book, A Divided Sisterhood: A Critical Review of Janice Raymond’s The Transsexual Empire as a pamphlet with the radical Liverpool bookshop News from Nowhere. The response expanded upon her earlier work and characterized the book as supporting "the methods of patriarchy" and "dangerous to transsexuals because it does not treat us as human beings at all, merely as the tools of a theory". In it, she criticized the characterization of gender identity clinics as an "empire", suggesting that they were viewed with suspicion by the medical patriarchy and forced transsexuals to go through gender-conformity training.

In 1978, Riddell retired from academic life to devote herself to the New Age movement as well as radical feminism, and at that time she intended to make a study of the Findhorn Foundation. In 1983 she joined the foundation, and in 1991 she published the book The Findhorn Community: Creating a Human Identity for the 21st Century with the Findhorn press. In the 1990s she worked for Highland Renewal, a charity which restored natural ecosystems in the Ross of Mull.
