= Histories of the Transgender Child =

2018 book by Jules Gill-Peterson

- Author: Jules Gill-Peterson
- Language: English
- Genre: Non-fiction
- Publisher: University of Minnesota Press
- Publication date: 2018
- Publication place: United States
- ISBN: 978-1-517-90466-1

Histories of the Transgender Child is a 2018 transgender studies book by the transgender author and academic Jules Gill-Peterson. The book is an exploration of transgender childhood in the United States throughout the twentieth century. It received the 2019 Lambda Literary Award for Transgender Nonfiction and the 2018 Children's Literature Association Book Award.

== Themes ==
=== Historicization ===
Gill-Peterson explained in an interview with The Guardian that she was motivated to write the book while thinking about media visibility of trans children in the twenty-first century:

I started to think about what happens when you're part of a group that gets framed as brand new. There's this cloak of caution and fear around trans kids, this idea that "We don't know what it means for a child to transition"...I had a sense as a historian that these ideas were probably not true and wanted to do historical research that would challenge this, by showing that trans kids have been around for a long time.

To accomplish this, the book describes the history of transgender children in the United States in the early 1900s. Gill-Peterson uses medical and psychotherapeutic records to describe specific children in the 1920s and '30s, such as a transgender girl using the alias Val. Other examples are found in the records of the Brady Urological Institute of Johns Hopkins Hospital, usually in the context of transgender adults seeking gender-affirming medical treatment who described their childhoods as transgender.

=== Racial plasticity ===
Gill-Peterson discusses "plasticity," the theory that human sex is determined by endocrinology, rather than fixed by genitalia at birth. She argues that plasticity theory was created to justify and explain medical experimentation on intersex children. Doctors interpreted children's relatively high potential for physical change of both sex organs and secondary sex characteristics as evidence of sex's susceptibility to environmental determination. Gill-Peterson examines records of hormone, metabolic, and surgical treatment of intersex children to show the emergence of treatments based on the idea of the plasticity of sex. She also shows that sexologist John Money's early articles theorizing gender as separate from biological sex "relied on an analogy to this same material, biological plasticity" to justify the assignation of gender to children.

Gill-Peterson argues that conceptions of plasticity are linked to race, and that plasticity is itself an "abstract form of whiteness." She discusses plasticity in the context of the scientific experiments of socialist eugenicists Eugen Steinach and Paul Kammerer, who attempted to prove that sex characteristics changed according to climate, and that different ethnic and geographic groups therefore had different sex characteristics. According to Gill-Peterson, Steinach and Kammerer "mobilized the endocrine system’s now established developmental plasticity to bind sex to race."

=== Idealization of trans childhood ===
Gill-Peterson writes that the medical establishment uses white trans children as models of an idealized form of transness. Children who transition before puberty are deemed more adequately "transitioned." As Gill-Peterson writes throughout the book, these medical professionals have "packaged profoundly normalizing rhetoric as scientific and progressive". Gill-Peterson uses this narrative as a way to further develop her argument against the liberal "romance with plasticity," writing that these narratives risk reinforcing the hegemony of the binary gender system.

=== The limits of the archive ===
Gill-Peterson criticizes the strict use of archival research as a form of research that privileges medical professionals and those with access to institutional medical care. She explains her project as one that prioritizes the knowledge of people usually "disqualified as unscientific, such as women, people of color, and colonized peoples". She uses Donna Haraway’s concept of "situated knowledge," which rejects the supposed "objective universality" of medical establishment ideas about transness. Gill-Peterson sees the limits of the archive as "less a reason to abandon the archive than an invitation to invent better interpretive practices that break from dominant epistemologies and ontologies."

== Methods ==
Gill-Peterson relied heavily on archival research in completion of this text, listing 18 primary archives. Most are different records collections maintained by Johns Hopkins Hospital or the Kinsey Institute. The University of Pittsburgh and University of Los Angeles's respective archives are also cited, as are the Maryland State Archives and the Lesbian, Gay, Bisexual & Transgender Community Center Archive.

== Reception ==
The book received positive reviews from scholars of trans studies and queer theory. Gabrielle Owen, professor of children's literature and queer theory at the University of Nebraska-Lincoln, claimed that "for children's literature scholars who work on gender and sexuality, this book is essential reading." She recommended the book for its "insights that transgender children are not new, and binary sex and gender are...ideas reliant on a dehumanizing, racially coded conceptualization of the child."

In another review, performance studies and transgender studies scholar Anthony Sansonetti praises the book as "bountiful and vibrant," especially its "meticulous read" of turn-of-the-century scientific literature on biological sex. They emphasize Gill-Peterson's "careful attention" to the nuances of archival details as an "active listening practice," claiming this practice as an example of her positive attitude towards transgender children.

In 2019, the American academic and literary magazine The Rambling published a special issue about Histories of the Transgender Child. In the edition's introduction, trans author Rebekah Sheldon writes, "Gill-Peterson’s refusal of these adulterated pleasures, her conviction that the world is already adequate to itself and needs no missing language to mark the utopian horizon, may be her book’s most decisive break with something that was once called homosexual reading, and the one from which I find myself the most, if you’ll excuse me, left behind."

The book received the Lambda Literary Award for Transgender Nonfiction and the John Leo and Dana Heller Award from the Popular Culture Association.

In 2022, Spanish sociologist Javier Sáez del Álamo published a Spanish translation of Histories of the Transgender Child titled Historias de la infancia trans.
