= A Short History of Trans Misogyny =

2024 book by Jules Gill-Peterson

- The book's cover, featuring the face of a Black drag queen who appears in the experimental documentary film Tongues Untied
- Author: Jules Gill-Peterson
- Language: English
- Genre: Non-fiction
- Publisher: Verso Books
- Publication date: January 30, 2024
- Publication place: United States
- Pages: 192
- ISBN: 9781804291566

A Short History of Trans Misogyny is a 2024 book by transgender author and academic Jules Gill-Peterson which discusses the origins of transmisogyny, hatred or violence toward trans women and other people which she describes as "trans-feminized". Peterson examines how transmisogyny was part of colonial statecraft across many parts of the world, focusing in particular on the genocide of the two-spirit people in the Americas, the criminalization of the hijra people in British India, the murder of Jennifer Laude in the Philippines by an American soldier, and the policing and sensational press coverage of sex worker Mary Jones in New York City.

== Background ==
The book was edited by Rosie Warren. Peterson says she first began writing it when Warren contacted her. Peterson developed its ideas while she was a scholar-in-residence at the University of Southern California’s Consortium for Gender, Sexuality, Race, and Public Culture and while lecturing at UC Irvine, and received feedback from the University of Washington, Boston University, Columbia University, Brandeis University, Rutgers University, Stanford University, the Leslie-Lohman Museum, the University of Utah, the Thinking Trans / Trans Thinking Conference, the University of Exeter, the University of Virginia, NYU, Princeton University, the University of Mississippi, and the Thinking Gender conference at UCLA.

== Content ==
Throughout the book, Peterson uses the term trans-feminizing to refer to a process in which people are marked for transmisogynistic violence by an institutional power. In interviews, she has said she was motivated by a desire to differentiate trans-feminized populations from the contemporary category of self-identified trans women, which she describes as specific to Euro-American culture and inappropriately universalized.

== Reception ==
Associate Professor of English at Yale University Juno Richards positively reviewed the book, saying it "offers a record of the ways transfeminine lives have been and continue to be lived".

Scholar McKenzie Wark described it as a "game-changer of a book" and "a much-needed account of the genesis of trans misogyny and its subsequent history".

Researcher Julianna Neuhouser criticized the book for its perceived orientalist attitude toward travesti populations and lack of engagement with Latin American transfeminism, saying it "[underestimates] the very real problems faced by transfeminine people outside the imperial core while idealizing their lifeways".

The book was shortlisted with distinction for The Transfeminine Review's Readers Choice Awards for Best Transfeminine Nonfiction in 2024.
