= Homophobia: A History =

2000 book by Byrne Fone

- Author: Byrne Fone
- Language: English
- Subject: History, Queer Studies, Discrimination
- Genre: Nonfiction
- Publisher: Metropolitan Books (Henry Holt and Company)
- Publication date: 2000
- Publication place: United States
- Pages: 480
- ISBN: 978-1466817074

Homophobia: A History is a 2000 book by Byrne Fone which documents how homophobia appeared and evolved throughout the history of Western societies. It primarily focuses on male-oriented homophobia, which censures gay men, men who have sex with men, and men perceived to act effeminately. The book studies cultures from ancient Greece until the United States in the late 20th century.

== Background ==
At the time of writing, Fone was an English Professor Emeritus at CUNY and had previously edited The Columbia Anthology of Gay Literature in 1998. In an interview with author David Bowman, Fone stated that he intended the book for a general audience of "educated" readers, and not just historians or gay readers:

I'm really more interested in trying to present this spectrum of history that homophobia has an origin and has a past and is still with us unfortunately. I want everyone to read this book and draw their own conclusions. [Pause] Homophobes are going to read this and say, "He's absolutely right. Homophobia has always been there."

When it was published, there had been little academic and societal introspection on the history of homophobia in Western civilization. As Fone wrote in the book, "in modern Western society, where racism is disapproved, anti-Semitism is condemned, and misogyny has lost its legitimacy, homophobia remains, perhaps the last acceptable prejudice."

== Content ==
Homophobia: A History documents how the elements of homophobia appeared throughout different Western cultures, until this concept had been enshrined in philosophy, literature, religion, and law. It traces homophobia's roots from ancient Greece, where societal misogyny spurned revulsion towards men who acted femininely. The book ends with homophobia's forms in the late 1900s in the United States.

The book begins by documenting ancient Greek attitudes towards sexual practices between men, the tradition of pederasty, and the societal punishment of men whose sexual practices did not fit expected norms. It documents how Greek censure of male femininity grew over time, while sex between men remained celebrated. During the Roman Empire's height, these trends remained, with the permissibility of male sexual practices based on the participant's status and position, rather than their gender.

Homophobia notes the rise of Christianity in the Roman Empire as a turning point for the permissibility of sex between men. Culturally and religiously, sex began to be treated as a tool for procreation, with abstinence celebrated, and thus same-sex practices began to be seen as criminal. The book documents the growth of forms of homophobia, its condemnation of sex between men as a sin and crime, and the later practice of trials and executions for sodomy. The biblical story of Sodom and Gomorrah became the key religious justification for condemning sex between men at this time, and Fone performs textual analysis to conclude that the heavily disputed meaning of one word in the story became the basis for this interpretation. The book documents how the term "sodomy" was introduced, and how "sodomite" became a slur that the Christian Church labeled on many of their religious or civic enemies. Sodomy charges were used for Church authorities, and later the English King Henry VIII, to seize assets from political opponents. The Christian Church and various governments spent centuries treating sodomites as a class of men that must be hunted down and exterminated via various institutionalized execution methods.

Fone documents the decriminalization and growing tolerance of sodomy in Europe during the Enlightenment, and how England in particular changed its censure of sodomy to oblique condemnation. He shares the scientific and medical fields' efforts to classify people's sexuality using physiognomy and phrenology starting in the 1800s. Supposed tells for a man being gay included whether a man could whistle, whether his favorite color was green or mauve, and if he smoked femininely. Homophobia then documents how the concept of homosexuality grew to prominence in the 1900s, along with the idea that it was a medical issue and a threat to armies and governments, especially in the United States with the McCarthy trials.

Fone focuses on the United States in his examination of the 1900s. He documents the growth of the gay rights movement, including the Mattachine Society, as a response to prior oppression.

The book mentions that homophobia is linked to sexism and racism, but does not go into detail. It also mainly focuses on attitudes toward male homosexuality, spending very little time on societal treatment of female homosexuality.

== Reception ==
Reviewers praised the book as an important general-interest introduction to a marginalized topic, while critiquing various organizational and theoretical choices made in the book. Kirkus Reviews described it as a "readable and provocative history for both nonacademics and scholars."

Several reviewers hoped the book would increase understanding of homophobia and thus help mitigate it, with Laurent Cartayrade writing for The Washington Post that he hoped the book would help reduce homophobia, if only people with unconscious homophobic attitudes would read it.

Some reviewers were impressed by Fone's textual analysis of the Bible and his conclusion that the story of Sodom and Gomorrah had been reinterpreted to justify homophobia due to a contested reading of the word yadha.

Some reviewers wished Fone had written about women and intersectionality more in the book. In a later interview, Fone stated that documentation of women in history "doesn't exist" because history was primarily written by men, about men, and additionally, men may have struggled to imagine lesbianism. Rebecca Whisnant, in a letter to the editor following the book's Salon review, put more blame on the Salon reviewer: "I've heard of lesbian invisibility, but this is ridiculous. Michael Alvear has managed to write an entire review of a book about homosexuality and homophobia without once mentioning love between women, let alone the ways in which it has been denied, erased, and punished throughout history."

Several reviews wished Fone would have organized the writing better: it largely followed a chronological sequence of events, but sometimes jumped ahead by theme. Kirkus Reviews suggested it should be reorganized thematically, while Michael Alvear, writing for Salon, wanted him to stick to a more rigid chronology. Publishers Weekly wished he would have interrogated the social and political nature of homophobia more.

The Salon review of Homophobia: A History was classified under the topic of "Sex," which Fone contested in a letter to the editor. Fone explained that he saw this as an instance of how homophobic attitudes minimize gay people and literature as just concerning sex.

== See also ==
- A Short History of Trans Misogyny
- The History of Sexuality
