= Cynbe ru Taren =

American computer scientist

Jeffrey Prothero
- Born: Jeffrey Prothero; March 15, 1956; London, Ontario, Canada
- Died: November 16, 2016 (aged 60)
- Other name: Cynbe ru Taren
- Occupation: Programmer
- Spouse: Sandy Stone (m. 1995)

Jeffrey Prothero (March 15, 1956 – November 16, 2016 ) , also known as Cynbe ru Taren, was a Canadian-born American computer programmer. He was the author of Citadel, one of the first virtual world systems and also one of the longest-running open source projects; the Digital Anatomist software, better known as the Visible Human Project; the original Pascal strek.pas Star Trek game program; the first Loglan parsers; and Mythryl, a production-grade port of SML/NJ. Prothero used the screenname "Cynbe ru Taren" online. Cynbe ru Taren is the name of a fictional alien in Poul Anderson's 1964 science fiction novel The Star Fox. In the novel, Cynbe ru Taren is an "Aleriona Intellect Master of the Garden of War, fleet admiral, and military strategist of the Grand Commission of Negotiators." He died on November 16, 2016, aged 60, from colorectal cancer.

== Early life and education ==
Prothero was born on March 15, 1956, in London, Ontario, to academic parents, John and Joyce Prothero.

Prothero lived in Seattle, programming and designing virtual worlds, until 1997, when he moved to Austin, Texas, to live with his wife, Sandy Stone.

== The Digital Anatomist/Visible Human ==
In 1974, Jeffrey Prothero began his career at the University of Washington’s Visual Techniques Laboratory. Working within the Department of Biological Structure, he developed Skandha, a groundbreaking visualization system designed to assemble microscopic tissue sections into manipulatable 3D images.

This work became the foundation of the Digital Anatomist project. The team collaborated with Swedish researcher Wolfgang Rauschning, whose unique "subtractive" microtomy method captured high-resolution, undistorted images by photographing the surface of frozen tissue after removing layers only molecules thick. By integrating Rauschning’s data with Prothero’s software, the team created vivid, "fly-through" anatomical reconstructions, which they hosted freely online.

The project’s success caught the attention of the National Library of Medicine, leading to a call for proposals for what would become the Visible Human Project. However, the University of Colorado secured the contract by using Prothero’s freely available data tapes as proof of their own capabilities—without providing attribution.

While legal, this lack of transparency caused significant friction. Colorado continued to display Prothero’s work for three years, even though their own eventual methodology utilized a coarser sectioning process (resembling a bandsaw) that yielded lower-quality results. Frustrated by the lack of recognition and the loss of the national contract to a group using their own work against them, the lead scientists of the Digital Anatomist project eventually resigned.

== Citadel BBS ==
In 1980, Prothero built his own computer and launched a new message system in just ten days. Originally named after its phone number, the program eventually became known as Citadel. By 1981, the software was fast and efficient, fitting entirely on a small floppy disc. Users navigated the system by moving through virtual "rooms" connected by hidden paths.

Even in these early days, users struggled with online conflict, including bullying and constant arguing. Exhausted by the stress of policing these interactions, Prothero handed the project to a friend. This version became the standard for others to follow.

In 1982, Prothero added "aides"—a group of moderators with limited powers—to help manage the community. To keep things fair, their actions were recorded in a permanent log. He also added basic security to protect user data. Prothero eventually shared the underlying instructions for the program with the public, making it one of the longest-lasting community-run software projects in history.
