= Peter Sewally =

American gender-variant prostitute also known as Mary Jones

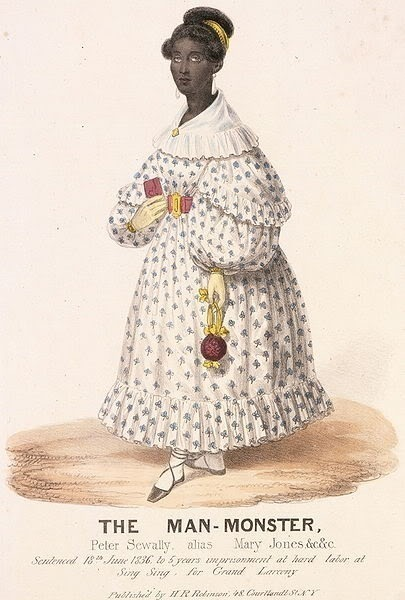
- Lithograph of Sewally as Mary Jones
- Born: Peter Sewally; December 12, 1803; New York City, U.S.
- Died: Unknown
- Other names: Mary Jones; Julia Johnson; Beefsteak Pete
- Occupation: Prostitute
- Years active: c. 1836–1853

Peter Sewally (December 12, 1803 – after 1853) was an American sex worker who presented as a woman under names including Mary Jones. According to The Sun, they would wear "a dashing suit of male apparel" in the day, while dressing in feminine attire and wearing a prosthetic vagina at night to solicit sexual services for men and steal their money. They are most well known for being the subject of a trial in 1836 where they were charged with grand larceny for stealing the wallets of men they engaged in sexual acts with.

== Early life ==
At Sewally's 1836 trial, they testified that they had been born December 12, 1803, in New York City. They were assigned male at birth and used the legal name of Peter Sewally. Sewally may have been born free, and due to New York state's emancipation laws, they were at least free by July 4, 1827.

Sewally testified that they had previously served in the military and lived in New Orleans. Before their 1836 arrest, they lived and worked at a popular brothel at 108 Greene Street in Soho, Manhattan, York City. Besides greeting clients, Sewally performed domestic tasks for the residence's sex workers.

Sewally also lived and performed sex work, presenting as a woman, and sometimes stole money from their clients. During their trial, Sewally claimed that they had always dressed as a woman in New Orleans and during balls thrown by Black people, sharing that their presentation had been accepted in these settings.

Historians Tavia Nyong'o and Jules Gill-Peterson conclude that Sewally's biographical claims are plausible but cannot be fully verified: since Sewally's only recorded speech arose from interrogation, their accuracy merits skepticism, but some of their details align with available context. Other contemporary accounts of Sewally's life were written by reporters with similarly conflicting motivations.

== First reported trial ==
On June 11, 1836, a man who had solicited sexual services from Sewally – who was working under the name Mary Jones – realized on returning home that his wallet had been stolen. "Mary Jones" was found and arrested, and when searched, was found to have male genitalia. Several more wallets were found in their room.

One newspaper discreetly reported (in Latin) that Sewally, "to sustain his pretension, and impose upon men as sexus femineus, fabrefactus fuerat pertio bovillis, (cara bubulu) terebratus et apertus similis matrix muliebris, circumligio cum cingulum!!!" According to scholar Jonathan Katz, the "clumsy" Latin says that Sewally "had been fitted with a piece of cow [leather?] pierced and opened like a woman's womb [vagina is the intended word] help up by a girdle"; Katz added that "educated, Latin-reading, upper-class men could apparently contemplate such details without harm; women and lower-class persons of either sex could not." Reports of Sewally's subsequent arrests often referred to them as "Beefsteak Pete" in reference to this prosthesis.

In coverage of their trial, on June 16, 1836, Sewally's feminine attire was given as much or more attention than did the crimes of which they were accused: they reportedly appeared in court wearing a wig, white earrings, and a dress. According to The Sun, someone in the audience grabbed the wig off their head, thereby prompting "a tremendous roar of laughter throughout the room".

When asked why they were dressed in feminine attire, they stated:

I have been in the practice of waiting upon Girls of ill fame and made up their Beds and received the Company at the door and received the money for Rooms and they induced me to dress in Women's Clothes, saying I looked so much better in them and I have always attended parties among the people of my own Colour dressed in this way—and in New Orleans I always dressed in this way—

Sewally was convicted of grand larceny and sentenced to five years imprisonment at Sing Sing. This was the maximum sentence allowed for their crime.

Soon after, a lithograph was published depicting Sewally in women's clothing and referring to them as "The Man-Monster". The poster was mass-produced and sold at print shops in New York City. Designer Jon Key notes the contrast in the work between its elegant portrayal of Sewally as a fashionable woman and the clumsy and grotesque printed title. Key states that "her presentation and visibility as a trans woman is, remarkably, transcribed as she saw herself...the choice was made to portray her with dignity and beauty, even if the title contradicts the drawing."

== Later arrests and press coverage ==
In 1845 the Commercial Advertiser reported that Sewally had been arrested again, and in 1846 the New York Herald reported that Sewally had been released after serving six months for "playing up his old game [and] sailing along the street in the full rig of a female". They were arrested several more times throughout the 1840s and as late as 1853. Between 1842 and 1858, Sewally spent seven years in New York state jails, including Sing Sing, Blackwell's Island Penitentiary, and the Tombs. Sewally worked in woodturning while imprisoned and often returned to sex work in New York City when released.

Sewally was most often arrested at night while wearing women's clothing and charged with vagrancy or disorderly conduct. At the time, the charge of vagrancy was often used against sex workers and free Black people in New York City. Newspapers covered at least five of Sewally's arrests for petty theft. Each article included descriptions of their continued dress and expression as a woman. The court and contemporary press uniformly assigned Sewally a male gender identity. However, in an 1848 arraignment interview, Sewally presented themself as a woman and used the name Julia Johnson. During this interview, Johnson was described as a woman by law enforcement until later in the trial when their history was identified.

== Academic analysis ==
Scholars Tavia Nyong'o and C. Riley Snorton describe the penny press's extended coverage of Sewally as sensationalizing. Press coverage focused on how they "disguised" themself and what their clients knew of their gender identity. Most coverage of Sewally was hostile or satirizing, and only Sewally's 1836 trial described their own self-image. Since newspapers frequently treated Sewally as a joke, accounts of Sewally merit skepticism. Historian Jules Gill-Peterson argues that everything except for Sewally's own testimony "was the fantasy, punchline, or wholesale invention of a white author".

Since the 1990s, when historian Timothy R. Gilfoyle uncovered press coverage of Sewally, academics have begun studying their history. The first historians studying Sewally interpreted their identity through the lens of sexual orientation, often arguing Sewally was a cisgender gay man. Later, scholars interpreted Sewally's identity in the context of gender identity, feminism, and Black studies.

== In popular culture ==
Artist Arthur Jafa featured a reimagining of what Sewally would have looked like in a self-portrait photograph titled La Scala in his art showcase, A Series of Utterly Improbable, Yet Extraordinary Renditions.

The Brooklyn Museum commissioned filmmaker Tourmaline to create a short film named Salacia focusing on the life of Sewally. The short was screened at the museum from May 3 to December 9, 2019. As of 2020, it is screened by the Museum of Modern Art as part of their permanent collection.
