= The Empire Strikes Back: A Posttranssexual Manifesto =

Foundational essay in transgender studies

"The Empire Strikes Back: A Posttranssexual Manifesto" is a 1987 essay written by Sandy Stone. Stone's essay is considered to be the founding text of transgender studies in academia, with other critical transgender works emerging after it. The essay examines how transgender women have historically been viewed, studied, and treated by the western medical establishment.

In the essay, Stone critiques medical research and theory that deem transgender individuals too illogical or damaged to represent themselves, as well as the institution of passing and its role in the reproduction of binary gender and sexist social norm. Stone argues that these social phenomena have precluded transgender individuals from participating in their own discourse, and bear negative psychic, social, and political consequences. In response, she proposes the formation of a counter-discourse that disrupts binary understandings of gender, thereby allowing transgender individuals to speak as transgender subjects.

The work was made largely in response to personal attacks made by Janice Raymond in her 1979 book The Transsexual Empire: The Making of the She-Male, as well as targeted harassment Stone experienced during her employment at Olivia Records.

== Background ==
"The Empire Strikes Back: A Posttranssexual Manifesto" was written primarily in response to Janice Raymond's 1979 book The Transsexual Empire: The Making of the She-Male. The book includes criticisms of Stone—a transgender woman—regarding her employment as a sound engineer at the women's music record label, Olivia Records. Stone was also the target of organized harassment from trans-exclusionary radical feminists demanding her expulsion from Olivia Records. Some have argued that this behavior was prompted and emboldened by Raymond's text. Stone eventually left Olivia Records and later pursued goals in academia.

Stone completed her essay as a doctoral student at the University of California, Santa Cruz (UCSC), where she had studied under Donna Haraway. She was a part of the history of consciousness program, which included faculty members such as Angela Davis, Gloria Anzaldúa, Donna Haraway, and Teresa de Lauretis.

=== Publication history ===
Stone wrote the essay as a first year student project in 1987. In 1988, she presented the essay for the first time at the "Other Voices, Other Worlds: Questioning Gender and Ethnicity" conference, held at UCSC, where Stone was a doctoral student at the time.

The essay was published in 1991 in the anthology Body Guards: The Cultural Politics of Gender Ambiguity. In 2006, the essay was included in The Transgender Studies Reader.

== Summary ==
Throughout the essay, Stone examines several representations of male-to-female "transsexuals", including autobiographies, biographies, and medical literature. She begins with a passage from Jan Morris's Conundrum (1974), and goes on to discuss Niels Hoyer's account of Lili Elbe in Man Into Woman (1933), Hedy Jo Star's autobiography I Changed My Sex! (1963), and Canary Conn's Canary (1977). These accounts are all discussed critically for their portrayal of transsexualism as a simple switch from male to female with no ambiguity or middle period, and for their tendency to reinforce "a binary, oppositional mode of gender identification."

Also discussed is the role of physicians and medical literature in reinforcing this binary. Notably, she refers to Niels Hoyer's report that after sex reassignment surgery, Lili Elbe's handwriting changed drastically and she began to faint at the sight of blood. Stanford Clinic's "charm school" or "grooming clinic" is also cited as one clear way in which predominately male doctors sought to teach transsexual women how to "behave like women".

In section four, "Whose story is this, anyway?", the essay discusses how much of the research and writing on transsexualism has been done by people who are not transsexual, and that transsexual women are similar to cisgender women in that both have been historically "infantilized" and considered too "illogical" to speak for themselves in the realms of science and literature.

Stone also problematizes the Diagnostic and Statistical Manual of Mental Disorders (DSM) categorization of transsexualism as a disorder in 1980, citing Leslie Lothstein's studies on differential diagnoses for transsexuals and other sources describing transsexualism as a form of mental illness, many of which used questionable methodology such as selecting samples consisting only of severely ill people or sex workers.

Furthermore, Stone claims Harry Benjamin's diagnostic criteria for transsexualism created a feedback loop, in which transsexual people deliberately conformed to the criteria in order to be considered eligible for surgery, leading doctors to believe that the criteria were an accurate method of differentiating transsexuals from the general public. Thus, transsexual people and doctors had begun "pursuing separate ends". This is further explained in the Stanford Encyclopedia of Philosophy, which states: "At the same time, argues Stone, transsexuals have also developed their own subcultures as well as distinctive practices within those subcultures that entirely run against the official account of transsexuality (such as helping each other know what to say and how to act in order to get medically designated as a transsexual)".

=== Criticism of radical feminism ===
Stone claimed she understood, and to some degree shared in, the suspicions of her feminist detractors, pointing out that both autobiographical and official accounts of transsexuality tended to reproduce sexist norms, stating, "It may come as no surprise that all of the accounts I will relate here are similar in their description of 'woman' as male fetish, as replicating a socially enforced role, or as constituted by performative gender." She discusses radical feminism critically not for its apprehension of this trend, but rather its goals of reducing trans women to instruments of patriarchal domination and rejecting them as eligible speaking subjects in their own discourse.

Stone directly criticizes Raymond for what she calls "inexcusable bigotry", specifically Raymond's claim that "all transsexuals rape women’s bodies". Citing this language as an example, Stone critiques trans-exclusionary radical feminists' tendency to totalize trans women as "...robots of an insidious and menacing patriarchy, an alien army designed and constructed to infiltrate, pervert and destroy 'true' women."

In light of these conflicts, Stone states that she does not advocate for a "shared discourse" with feminism, as trans women do not always experience common oppression with "genetic naturals" prior to transition. Rather, she argues:

I suggest we start by taking Raymond's accusation that "transsexuals divide women" beyond itself, and turn it into a productive force to multiplicatively divide the old binary discourses of gender--as well as Raymond's own monistic discourse. To foreground the practices of inscription and reading which are part of this deliberate invocation of dissonance, I suggest constituting transsexuals not as a class or problematic "third gender", but rather as a genre-- a set of embodied texts whose potential for productive disruption of structured sexualities and spectra of desire has yet to be explored.

=== Call to action ===
At the time of writing, Stone believed that the voices of trans individuals were not adequately represented in dominant discourse, and that the community had yet to form an effective counter-discourse. She argues that the institution of passing is partially to blame for this phenomenon, firstly because passing is complicit with a medical construction of transsexuality that reifies a strict gender binary, and secondly because it requires the practice of self-erasure or, in Stone's words, disappearing into one's "plausible history". The self-erasure required for access to treatment and societal acceptance (i.e. lying about one's past in the "opposite" gender or "wrong" body) is not only individually harmful in the form of self-denial and shame, but also politically harmful in making trans individuals culturally illegible, Stone argues. She openly repeats the political call to action made to homosexuals to come out:

This is familiar to the person of color whose skin is light enough to pass as white, or to the closet gay or lesbian... or to anyone who has chosen invisibility as an imperfect solution to personal dissonance. Essentially I am rearticulating one of the arguments for solidarity which has been developed by gays, lesbians and people of color.

Stone conceives of the "posttranssexual" as a transsexual who foregoes passing (as a cisgender man or woman). She believes this is the precondition for an honest and effective discourse, stating, "For a transsexual, as a transsexual, to generate a true, effective and representational counterdiscourse is to speak from outside the boundaries of gender."

Near the end of the essay, Stone concludes:

The essence of transsexualism is the act of passing. A transsexual who passes is obeying the Derridean imperative: "Genres are not to be mixed. I will not mix genres." I could not ask a transsexual for anything more inconceivable than to forgo passing, to be consciously "read", to read oneself aloud--and by this troubling and productive reading, to begin to write oneself into the discourses by which one has been written--in effect, then, to become a (look out-- dare I say it again?) posttranssexual.

== Analysis ==
Chris Coffman, an associate professor at the University of Alaska Fairbanks, wrote that Stone's essay staked "a claim for transgendered people within feminist theory and culture." Coffman noted that Stone's work, along with other queer theorists, countered previous constructions of transgender identity by medical institutions and opposed academia that presented transgender people as psychologically abnormal.

The Stanford Encyclopedia of Philosophy states that the text owes significantly to Haraway's "A Cyborg Manifesto" and Gloria Anzaldua's "mestiza consciousness". Stone makes explicit reference to Haraway's theorization of "Coyote", a process of continual self transformation. The essay is also influenced by Jacques Derrida’s textual theory and Michel Foucault’s politics of résistance.

Others have expanded Stone's concepts or incorporated them into their own frameworks, such as Talia Mae Bettcher, whose concept of first-person authority (FPA) is inspired by Stone’s appeal to "trans-authored narratives".

In the book Partly Colored, Leslie Bow summarizes Stone's idea that transsexuals face a "cultural imperative" to be socially accepted by representing themselves as male or female, and compares it to James Loewen's writings on racial pressures of what it meant to be Chinese or have "state-defined identities" of "colored" or "white" in the U.S. during the Jim Crow era.

== Reception and impact ==
The Empire Strikes Back is frequently credited as the founding text of transgender studies in academia, with other critical transgender works emerging after it.

In 2016, Susan Stryker and Talia M. Bettcher wrote that "Stone's manifesto integrated many different strands of feminist, queer, and trans analysis into a potent conceptual tool kit that remains vital for the field today."

== Notes ==
1.At the time of writing, the author used the term "transsexual" to refer to people who seek sex reassignment surgery.
