= Vidarte =

Vidarte is a surname. Notable people with the surname include:

- Walter Vidarte (1931–2011), Uruguayan actor
- Paco Vidarte (1970–2008), Spanish philosopher, writer, and activist
