= Jules Gill-Peterson =

Canadian historian and writer

Academic work
- Discipline: Historian
- Sub-discipline: Transgender history, transmisogyny
- Institutions: Johns Hopkins University
- Website: jgillpeterson.com

Jules Gill-Peterson is a Canadian historian specializing in transgender history. She was an associate professor of history at Johns Hopkins University and is now the current Chair in Transgender Studies and professor of history at University of Victoria. Her work focuses on how science, medicine, and race inform transgender embodiment. Her best-known work is Histories of the Transgender Child, which documents the 20th-century history of transgender childhood in the United States and received the 2019 Lambda Literary Award for Transgender Nonfiction. She is a general co-editor of Transgender Studies Quarterly, and was previously a research fellow at the American Council of Learned Societies and at the Kinsey Institute.

== Education and career ==
Peterson earned a bachelor's degree in history from the University of Ottawa in 2010 and received a PhD in American studies from Rutgers University in 2015. She was advised by Frances Bartkowski for her dissertation Queer Theory is Kid Stuff: A Genealogy of the Gay and Transgender Child.^{[1]}

In 2020, she received a Chancellor’s Distinguished Research Award from the University of Pittsburgh, where she previously served as a faculty member.^{[2][3]} While working at Johns Hopkins University, she made 10 publications mostly about transgender topics.

She is a narrator for Framing Agnes (2022),^{[4]} which won two awards at the 2022 Sundance Film Festival, one being an audience award that only five films were awarded.^{[5]}

In 2025 and 2026, she helped write amicus briefs to the United States Supreme Court, defending trans rights. The cases were US vs Skrmetti in 2025 and Virginia vs B.P.J. in 2026. She gave a seminar about the class divide between transgender people in 2026 at the LGBTQ Digital Collaboratory.

== Bibliography ==
- Histories of the Transgender Child. Minnesota University Press. 2018.
- A Short History of Trans Misogyny. Verso Books. 2024.
