= Transmisogyny =

Intersection of transphobia and misogyny

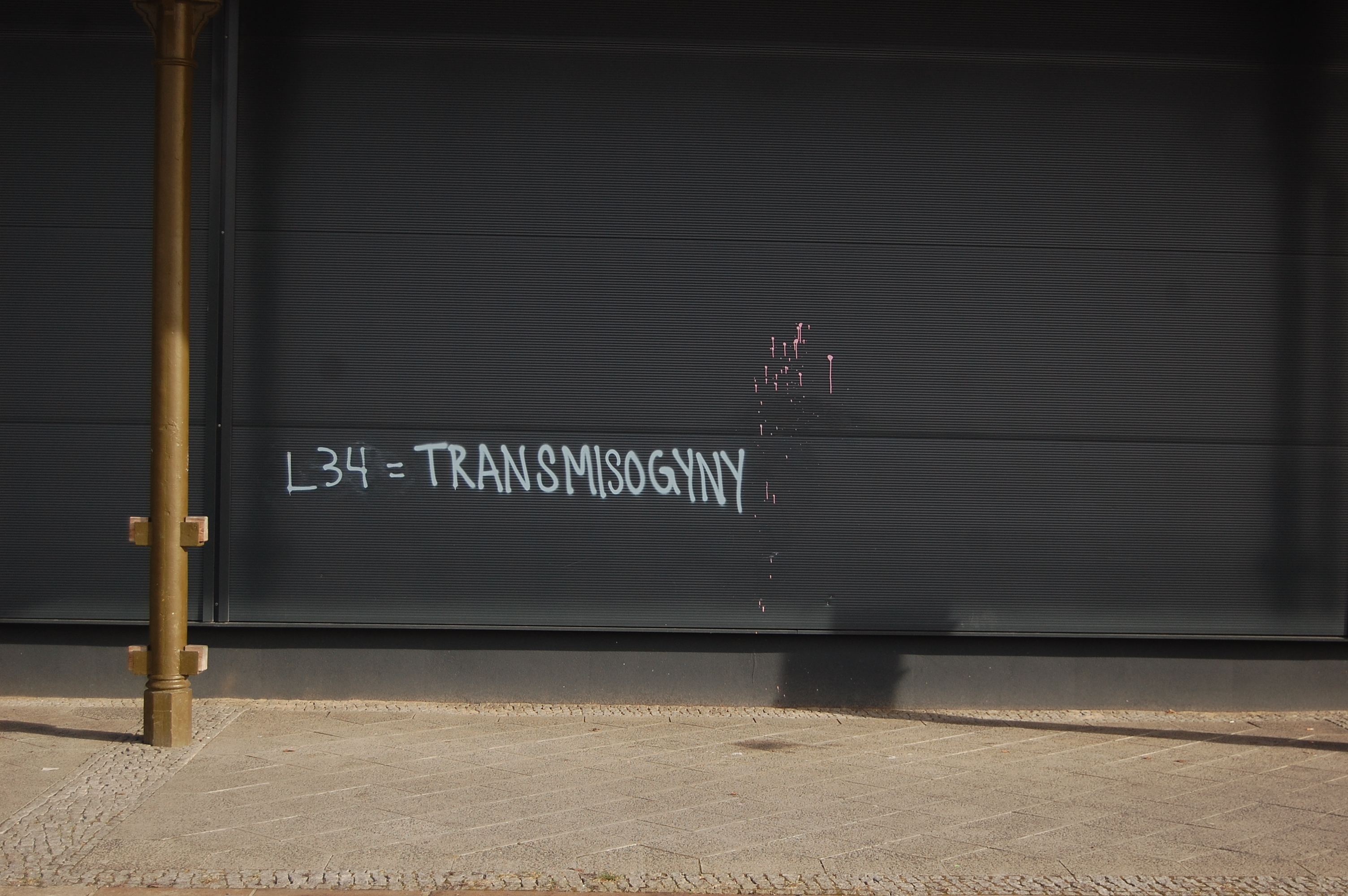
Graffiti in Berlin branding the Liebig 34 squatters as transmisogynists

Transmisogyny, otherwise known as trans-misogyny and transphobic misogyny, is the intersection of transphobia and misogyny as experienced by trans women and transfeminine people. The term was coined by Julia Serano in her 2007 book Whipping Girl to describe a particular form of oppression experienced by trans women. In a 2017 interview with The New York Times, Serano explores the roots of transmisogyny as a critique of feminine gender expressions which are "ridiculed in comparison to masculine interests and gender expression."

Transmisogyny is a central concept in transfeminism and is commonly referenced in intersectional feminist theory. In her definition of transmisogyny, Serano includes not only transgender people among those affected by transmisogyny, but also some cisgender people, such as those who identify as drag queens.

== Framework ==
The concept of transmisogyny hinges on two other concepts first described by Serano: traditional sexism and oppositional sexism. The former is the idea that "maleness and masculinity are superior to femaleness and femininity", while the latter holds male and female as "rigid, mutually exclusive categories". Transmisogyny stems from both these concepts.

In Whipping Girl, Julia Serano writes that the existence of trans women is seen as a threat to a "male-centered gender hierarchy". Gender studies academic Judith Butler echoes this assumption, stating that the murder of transgender women by men is "the most toxic form that masculinity can take", a way for the killer to assert power over the victim in the instant, in response to the idea of the intrinsic nature of his power (i.e., his masculinity) being threatened. Butler states that trans women have relinquished masculinity, showing that it is possible to do so.

Trans panic is a common legal and social defense strategy that is used to justify violence towards transgender individuals, particularly trans women. Similar to Gay Panic, it suggests that the aggressor was provoked into violence due to the victim's gender presentation being misleading or deceptive. In A Short History of Trans Misogyny, Jules Gill-Peterson outlines several moments of trans panic related violence leading back to the 1800s. She adds that, "The misgendering of trans-femme individuals as male sexual aggression… allows people to respond to trans femininity with as much preemptive violence as they desire."

== Relation to transphobia ==
Transmisogyny is a distinct category of transphobia in that transmisogyny mainly focuses on trans women and other transgender individuals who demonstrate femininity, whereas transphobia is a more general term, covering a broader spectrum of prejudice and discrimination towards transsexual and transgender individuals. Julia Serano states in Whipping Girl that "[w]hen the majority of jokes made at the expense of trans people center on 'men wearing dresses' or 'men who want their penises cut off' that is not transphobia – it is transmisogyny. When the majority of violence and sexual assaults committed against trans people is directed at trans women, that is not transphobia – it is transmisogyny."

In an interview in The New York Times, Serano states the discrimination experienced by transgender women differs from that experienced by transgender men as follows:

Once in San Francisco I saw a trans woman dressed like an average feminine woman walk past a straight couple on the street. The man turned to the woman and sneered "Did you see all that crap he's wearing?" He was referring to her dress and jewelry and makeup and all that. If a trans man had walked by, they might also have ridiculed him for being transgender. But I doubt very much they would have made fun of his masculine clothing.

=== Online stereotypes ===
The phenomenon described by Serano is particularly evident in online depictions of trans women, mainly in Internet memes wherein trans women are often derogatorily portrayed as masculine men wearing feminine clothing. The same transphobic depictions also often attempt to express that trans women suffer from victim mentality, are overreactive and demanding, or are "pretending" to be women with the intention of sexually harassing "real" women and/or children. Such motifs are particularly prominent in discourse surrounding trans bathroom bills.

== By country ==
=== United States ===
Transgender women face harsher levels of discrimination than some other transgender people. An analysis of around 7,000 LGBTQ+ workers conducted by the HRC Foundation found that trans women report the largest wage gap out of the gender-variant demographics, earning 60 cents for every one dollar earned by a typical worker, less than what is earned by trans men and nonbinary workers (70 cents for every one dollar), who in turn earn less than cis workers of either gender (87 cents for LGBT women, 96 cents for LGBT men). However, the opposite effect was also observed in a study published in Labour Economics based on data from the US Transgender Survey, which has a different methodology and sample, notably including closeted trans people and any employment status.

According to Laura Kacere (2014), trans people experience a disproportionately large number of hate crimes, with trans women experiencing the majority of these crimes. The National Coalition of Anti-Violence Programs (2012) found that police violence is three times higher against transgender people than it is against cisgender people. In fact, over half of all anti-LGBTQIA+ homicides were perpetrated against transgender women. (See List of people killed for being transgender.) In the United States, the majority of transmisogyny is directed at trans women of color. The Human Rights Campaign Foundation (2018) reports significant overlaps between the gender identity and race of anti-trans violence victims: of the known homicides of transgender people from 2013 to 2018, approximately 92% were trans women, and approximately 70% were black. Kacere (2014) also states that 21% of transgender women and 47% of black transgender women have experienced incarceration, rates that are much higher than those for the overall U.S. population.

=== Ecuador ===
A study of discrimination directed against lesbian, bisexual, transsexual, transgender and intersex women in Ecuador found that transgender women "lack protection against discrimination in both law and practice." As a result, trans women have faced violence, sexual abuse, and discrimination in educational, health and workforce institutions.

== Harassment and violence ==
=== Sexualization ===
Julia Serano has stated that many trans women experience an additional layer of misogyny in the form of fetishization. She notes that, despite public fixation on describing even post-transition trans women as male, they are rarely sexualized as men. In the porn industry, whose target audience is primarily heterosexual men, trans women are largely presented as sexual objects.

According to Serano, the sexualisation of trans women is not solely because transgender women, by nature of their relative rarity, are viewed as "exotic": she notes that trans women are sexualized particularly much even compared to other types of "rare" women. In Whipping Girl, Serano writes on what she calls a "predator–prey dichotomy" where "men are invariably viewed as predators and women as prey." Because of this view, trans women are perceived to be luring men by transitioning and "turning [themselves] into sexual objects that no red-blooded man can resist."

=== Physical violence ===
Transmisogynistic violence and harassment directed towards trans feminine individuals is often perpetrated by strangers rather than those known by the victim and oftentimes includes catcalling and other forms of verbal abuse. Although some states have non-discrimination laws protecting transgender individuals, there is no federal law specifically designed to protect those who identify as transgender.

Forming coalitions with trans activism is crucial to collectively challenge both ableism and transmisogyny. Transmisogyny and ableism often intersect, resulting in unique challenges for trans disabled individuals who face compounded discrimination and marginalization.

=== Sexual violence ===
Transgender women are at high risk for sexual violence, including rape and other forms of sexual assault and harassment. When trans women are sexually assaulted, they often experience discrimination while trying to access services. Among American transgender adults who attempted to access a rape crisis center, 4.9% were denied equal treatment because they were transgender. Transgender women were 2.44 times more likely than transgender men to report experiencing unequal treatment. Additionally, transgender people of color, those who did sex work, those who live in poverty, and those who were not U.S. citizens also experienced higher rates of unequal treatment.

=== Domestic violence ===
Transgender women, like other transgender people, are at high risk for domestic and intimate partner violence. In one systematic review of data from primarily Western countries, researchers found that 37.5% of transgender people had ever experienced physical violence from an intimate partner, and 25% had ever experienced sexual violence from an intimate partner. There was no significant difference between trans people assigned female at birth and trans people assigned male at birth.

Transgender women are underserved when attempting to flee domestic violence. In one American study, 77.9% of domestic violence shelters accepted transgender women, while 22.1% did not. 72.1% provided transitional housing services to trans female survivors of domestic violence, while 27.9% did not. Researchers found this data by contacting domestic violence agencies and asking which groups they accepted. Even if an agency provides services to transgender women in theory, they may not actually be able to access said services.

=== Abuse in prisons and detention centers ===
Transgender women are more likely to be incarcerated than the general population, and they also face high risk of discrimination and violence within the prison system. They may also be prevented from taking HRT while incarcerated. In the United States, many trans women are housed in men's prisons, where they face high levels of physical and sexual violence from both prison guards and other inmates.

== Healthcare ==
=== Healthcare access ===
Transgender women may encounter discrimination while attempting to access healthcare. In one American study, 22.8% of trans women reported avoiding healthcare because they feared discrimination. Trans women of color, those living in poverty, and those who did not believe they passed as cisgender were more likely to report avoiding healthcare. Black transgender women are particularly vulnerable; in one study, Black trans women reported that they avoided even taking transit to healthcare appointments for fear of physical violence. They may also fear disclosing their trans status because providers are more likely to refuse transgender patients. Healthcare avoidance can lead to medical complications and a need for more medical interventions later on. Transgender women in the United States are also less likely than cisgender women to have health insurance, which is instrumental in affording and accessing healthcare.

== Pseudoscience ==
Noteworthy in the discussion surrounding transmisogyny is also the idea of autogynephilia, a hypothetical paraphilia proposed by Ray Blanchard, and defined by him as "a male's propensity to be sexually aroused by the thought of himself as a female." Although modern scientific knowledge does not completely rule out the existence of autogynephilia as something that may occur in some individuals, it contradicts Blanchard's formulation that it is the basis for the transsexuality of lesbian trans women. The dominant scientific explanation remains the incongruence between gender identity and assigned sex, which is responsible for gender dysphoria. Nevertheless, autogynephilia is often promoted by anti-LGBT hate groups and transphobic writers as an attempt to pathologize trans identity.

On the topic of autogynephilia, Julia Serano (a former academic biologist by profession) has said: "If proponents of autogynephilia insist that every exception to the model is due to misreporting, then autogynephilia theory must be rejected on the grounds that it is unfalsifiable and therefore unscientific. If, on the other hand, we accept that these exceptions are legitimate, then it is clear that autogynephilia theory's two-subtype taxonomy does not hold true."

== See also ==
- Feminism – Range of socio-political movements and ideologies
- Fetishization of LGBTQ people
- Kyriarchy – In feminist theory, a social system based on oppression
- Misogynoir – Term for a type of misogyny toward black women
- Misogyny – Prejudice against, or hatred of, women
- Violence against women – Violent acts against women and girls
- Discrimination against transgender men
- Discrimination against nonbinary people – Prejudicial treatment of people who do not identify as male or female

== Bibliography ==
- Cicero, Ethan C.; Reisner, Sari L.; Silva, Susan G.; Merwin, Elizabeth I.; Humphreys, Janice C. (2019). "Health Care Experiences of Transgender Adults". Advances in Nursing Science. 42 (2): 123–138. doi:10.1097/ANS.0000000000000256. PMC 6502664.
