= Paco Vidarte =

Spanish writer and philosopher (1970–2008)

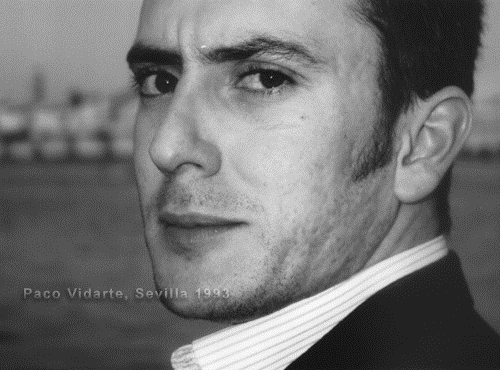
Paco Vidarte

Francisco "Paco" Javier Vidarte Fernández (1 March 1970 – 29 January 2008 in Madrid) was a Spanish philosopher, writer and LGBT activist.

== Biography ==
After studying philosophy at the Universidad Pontificia Comillas (UPC) in Madrid/Spain, as well as psychoanalysis at the Universidad Complutense Madrid), Vidarte became a Doctor of Philosophy at Universidad Nacional de Educación a Distancia (UNED) in Madrid with his dissertation about Jacques Derrida, on whose thought he later published several works.

From the mid-1990s onwards, Paco Vidarte, who was gay, was an active member of the LGBT movement in Spain, and especially Madrid. He was a member of the group "Radical Gai", and later became one of the leading queer theorists in Spain. In Ética Marica (2007), he strongly criticized assimilationist strategies by mainstream LGTB rights groups in Spain, advocating instead for a radically inclusive ethics.

He was a professor at UNED until his death in Madrid in 2008, caused by a malign form of lymphatic cancer and HIV. Since 2002, Vidarte was Professor of the Department of Philosophy at the Faculty of Philosophy of the UNED. He taught courses and seminars on queer theory, Derrida and contemporary French thought. He wrote and translated more than 20 books and articles on these subjects. He has participated in lectures, conferences and international philosophical seminars.

== Publications ==
=== Books ===
- Jacques Derrida. With Cristina de Peretti. Ed. del Orto, Madrid (1998).
- Homografías. With Ricardo Llamas. Espasa-Calpe, Madrid (1999).
- Marginales. Leyendo a Derrida (ed.). Aula Abierta, UNED, Madrid (2000).
- Extravíos. With Ricardo Llamas. Espasa-Calpe, Madrid (2001).
- Derritages. Une thèse en déconstruction. L’Harmattan, Paris (2001).
- Guerra y filosofía. La concepción de la guerra en el pensamiento filosófíco. With José García Caneiro. Tirant lo Blanc, Valencia (2002).
- Filosofías del siglo XX. With José Fernando Rampérez. Síntesis, Madrid (2005).
- Teoría queer With David Córdoba, Javier Sáez (eds.). Egales, Madrid (2005).
- ¿Qué es leer? La invención del texto en filosofía. Tirant lo Blanc, Valencia (2006).
- Ética Marica. Proclamas libertarias para una militancia LGTBQ. Egales, Madrid (2007). Translated to Portuguese as Ética bixa. Proclamaçoes libertárias para uma militância LGTBQ. N-1 Ediçoes, São Paulo (2019).
- Por una política a caraperro. Placeres textuales para las disidencias sexuales. Traficantes de Sueños, Madrid (2021). Posthumous edition by Javier Sáez and Fefa Vila.

=== Other publications ===
- Derriladacan: contigüedades sintomáticas. Sobre el "objeto pequeño j@cques". In Cristina de Peretti, Emilio Velasco (eds.), Conjunciones. Derrida y compañía. Madrid, Ed. Dykinson (2007).
- Disgayland: fantasies animades d'ahir i avui. In Josep Mª Armengol (ed.), Masculinitats per al segle XXI. Barcelona, CEDIC (2007).
