= Antonio Vidaurre =

Spanish painter, poet and writer

Antonio Vidaurre (1724, Madrid – 1780) was a Spanish painter, poet and writer.
