= John Ronald Brown =

American surgeon (1922 – 2010)

- Born: July 4, 1922; Mesa, Arizona, U.S.
- Died: May 16, 2010 (aged 87); San Diego, California, U.S.
- Occupation: Surgeon
- Convictions: 1998
- Criminal charge: Second-degree murder
- Penalty: 15 years to life

John Ronald Brown (July 4, 1922 – May 16, 2010) was an American surgeon who was convicted of second-degree murder after the death of a 79-year-old patient in his care.

== Early life ==
The son of a physician, Dr. Brown was born on July 4, 1922. He did well in school, graduating from high school by the age of 16. When drafted by the US Army during World War II, he scored exceptionally highly on the Army General Classification Test, which resulted in the Army sending him to medical school.

Brown graduated from University of Utah School of Medicine in 1947, and worked as a general practitioner for almost two decades. However, after almost losing a patient during a thyroidectomy, he decided to undertake formal surgical training.

Despite excelling in the written aspects of certification for the American Board of Plastic Surgery, he failed the oral assessment (blaming his 'domineering' father).

== Later medical career ==
By the early 1970s, Brown was carrying out gender-affirming surgery on transgender patients at a small clinic he set up in San Francisco. He would later claim to have performed 600 such surgeries during the course of his career.

At the time, only a small minority of patients met the exceptionally strict criteria for gender-affirming surgery. The program at the Johns Hopkins Gender Identity Clinic, for example, only approved surgery for 24 out of the first 2000 people who approached them with the request for it. Brown, by contrast, freely admitted that he was willing to operate on anybody who would pay him. His lack of a formal surgical qualification made it necessary for him to carry out gender-affirming procedures in his office on an out-patient basis, rather than in a fully equipped surgical theatre. He also operated on patients in motel rooms, and his own garage.

In 1977, following the death of one patient and a lawsuit from another, Brown's medical license was revoked by the California Board of Medical Quality Assurance for "gross negligence, incompetence and practicing unprofessional medicine in a manner which involved moral turpitude". He was also charged with allowing patients to work as unqualified, medical assistants (allegedly as barter for their own subsequent surgery), failing to hospitalize a patient who had developed a life-threatening infection and making false claims on medical insurance forms. Brown continued to practice medicine outside of California, but was successively barred from practicing in Hawaii, Alaska and the island of Saint Lucia.

During the 1980s Brown began soliciting and advertising surgical services in the United States, whilst performing the surgical procedures in Mexico. In 1986, an article in the magazine Forum reported on his procedure for surgically increasing penis length. The Forum article and an Inside Edition television documentary made several years later ("The Worst Doctor in America") both portrayed Brown as an incompetent and inept surgeon. While some of his patients were satisfied with their surgical results and praised Brown, he gained an overall poor reputation and the nickname "Butcher Brown" amongst the trans community. Despite this, desperate individuals continued to seek him out.

In 1990, Brown spent 19 months in prison for practicing medicine without a license. The charge came after Brown operated on a thirty-year-old transgender woman from Orange County, California. After leaving prison, Brown worked as a taxi driver for a year before re-establishing himself in medical practice.

== Murder conviction ==
On May 9, 1998, Brown performed a leg amputation on Philip Bondy, a 79-year-old, retired satellite engineer from New York, in Tijuana, Mexico. Bondy was one of the rare individuals suffering from body integrity identity disorder – a desire to have a healthy limb amputated. Very few reputable surgeons are willing to treat this disorder by carrying out such an amputation due to its direct violation of the Hippocratic oath.

The morning after the surgery, Bondy was found dead in a National City, California hotel room, by Dr. Gregg M. Furth, a New York child psychologist and fellow BIID sufferer who had traveled with Bondy to Mexico after being denied apotemnophilic surgery in the UK. Though they both wanted their legs amputated, Furth had backed out of having surgery with Brown at the last moment, after seeing an assistant carrying a large knife. An autopsy showed Bondy had died of gas gangrene. A police search of Brown's home – a ground floor unit in a San Ysidro apartment building – revealed blood-soaked towels, sheets and mattresses, as well as anaesthetizing drugs, surgical instruments and hundreds of tubes of super glue. Police also discovered video tapes of Brown's operations.

Brown was prosecuted in California for second-degree murder – an unusually severe charge in medical cases. A surgeon, who was a witness for the prosecution, testified that Brown had not left a large enough skin flap to properly cover the bone and stump. The flap was stretched too tightly to allow adequate blood flow and the tissue in the flap died, allowing an infection of Clostridium perfringens and producing gangrene. To make the murder charges stick, the prosecution had to establish that Brown had a history of incompetence and recklessness. A number of transgender women gave testimony of their experiences of Brown's treatment and subsequent medical history. However, he continued to have some supporters amongst former patients, even after his arrest.

Brown was convicted by unanimous decision and sentenced to fifteen years to life in prison.

== Illness and death ==
By spring 2010, Brown's health had deteriorated greatly and he came down with numerous health problems, including a severe bout of pneumonia. Treatment for his pneumonia eventually proved useless, his body eventually rejecting antibiotic medication. While arrangements to move Brown to a rest home in San Diego were being made, he died on the evening of 16 May 2010, at age 87.
