= Javier Sáez del Álamo =

Spanish sociologist, translator, and activist

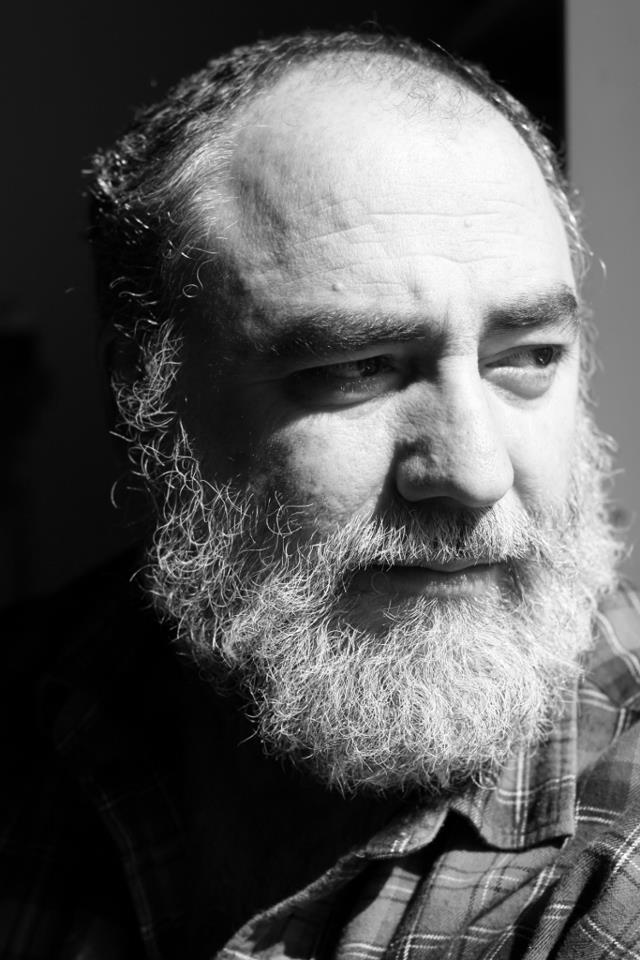
Javier Sáez del Álamo

Javier Sáez del Álamo is a Spanish sociologist, translator, and gay rights activist, specialising in queer theory and psychoanalysis.

== Infancy ==
Born in Burgos into a family of artists (his father was the painter Luis Sáez). His brother, Luis Sáez del Álamo, is a linguist and professor at the Complutense University of Madrid and his sister, Concha Sáez del Álamo, is an artist and professor at the University of Salamanca.

== Academic Training ==
He graduated in sociology and carried out his doctorate studies with Jesús Ibáñez Alonso. He completed his psychoanalytic studies with Jorge Alemán, specialising in the philosophies of Michel Serres, Michel Foucault and psychoanalyst Jacques Lacan.

== Queer activism and theoretical work ==
Over the last 30 years, Javier Sáez del Álamo has participated in diverse array of LGBT and queer organisations and has published various books about queer theory, articles about the theory of science and psychoanalysis, as well as about queer culture and politics.

Similarly, he has translated various works of key figures in the feminist and queer movement into Spanish, such as works by Judith Butler, Monique Wittig and Jack Halberstam.

He frequently participates as a speaker in courses and seminars on queer activism.

He has worked as a professor of sociology at the José Simeón Cañas Central American University in El Salvador, as well as at the Complutense University of Madrid and the National University of Distance Education. He also worked as an expert in anti-discrimination policy in the European Social Fund and as Advisor to the Special Representative of the Secretary General for the Rights of Romany People at the Council of Europe (Strasbourg). He was the co-founder and member of the editorial staff of the critical thought magazine Archipiélago. Since 1995 he has run the electronic magazine about queer cultures Hartza.

Between 2003 and 2005, he taught the course Introduction to Queer Theory at the National University of Distance Education alongside philosopher and gay activist Paco Vidarte.

He has run multiple HIV prevention campaigns.

The main contribution of Javier Sáez del Álamo to queer studies has been to open a dialogue between the Lacanian psychoanalytic community and the queer movements about the limitations of psychoanalysis in understanding sexual diversity from a non-heterocentric perspective and in turn, reclaim those aspects of psychoanalysis which are most subversive on the topic of sexuality. He also wrote about contemporary masculinity and about HIV prevention policies. His magazine Hartza, is an international reference point for the history of the queer movement, given that he collected the principal texts of the movement from the mid-90s onwards. The work of Javier Sáez has been influential on the work of Spanish philosopher Paco Vidarte, for contemporary feminist theorists like Judith Butler, Teresa de Lauretis and Monique Wittig, as well as for the psychoanalysts Jorge Alemán and Jean Allouch.

In his book, In the ass. Anal policies (written with Sejo Carrascosa), he analysed the discourse of hate and discrimination throughout history towards the passive position in anal sex and proposed a new model of sex and gender based on the penetrability or impenetrability of a body.

In 2015, he donated his entire inheritance (284 paintings by his father, the painter Luis Sáez) to the Romany Secretariat Foundation, in order to finance scholarships for female Romany students.

== Books ==
- Javier Sáez del Álamo (2024), Biopolítica del armario. Bellaterra, Barcelona. 978-84-19160-69-0.
- Javier Sáez del Álamo y Fefa Vila (2019). El libro de buen ∀mor. Sexualidades raras y políticas extrañas. Ayto. de Madrid. 978-84-7812-815-0.
- Javier Sáez del Álamo (2004). Teoría queer y psicoanálisis. Síntesis. ISBN 9788497561822.
- Javier Sáez del Álamo (2005). Théorie queer et psychanalyse (Edición en Francia ed.). EPEL. ISBN 2-908855-85-2.
- Javier Sáez del Álamo y Sejo Carrascosa (2011). Por el culo. Políticas anales. Egales. ISBN 978-84-92813-35-3.
- Javier Sáez del Álamo e Sejo Carrascosa (2017). Pelo cu: políticas anais (in Portuguese). Translated by Rafael Leopoldo. Brasil: Letramento. ISBN 978-85-68275-98-6.
- Javier Sáez del Álamo, David Córdoba y Paco Vidarte (2005). Teoría queer. Políticas bolleras, maricas, trans, mestizas. Egales. ISBN 84-95346-99-0..
- Javier Sáez del Álamo (2013). Guía de intervención social con población gitana desde la perspectiva de género. Fundación Secretariado Gitano. M-21481-2013.
- Javier Sáez del Álamo (2014). Guía práctica para los servicios policiales para prevenir la discriminación contra la Comunidad Gitana. Proyecto NET-KARD.
- Coautor: El eje del mal es heterosexual. Traficantes de Sueños, 2005. Grupo de Trabajo Queer. ISBN 84-96453-04-9.
- Coautor: Transfeminismo o barbarie (2020). Ed. Kaótica. VV.AA. 978-84-122129-2-1

== Published articles ==
- "Internamiento psiquiátrico, en el libro Diccionario Crítico de Ciencias Sociales, 2009. Editorial Plaza y Valdés, Madrid y México".
- "Palabra de Gitano. De las ferias de los monstruos a la televisión". EL PAÍS, 10 de octubre de 2013.
- El mundo hetero y el armario anal, en el libro El orgullo es nuestro. Ed. Diagonal. 2012. 978-84-938601-3-4.
- Guía para la gestión policial de la diversidad. Ed. Plataforma por la Gestión Policial de la Diversidad. Madrid, 2013. (Coordinador de la edición).
- Discriminación y Comunidad Gitana. Ed. Fundación Secretariado Gitano, Madrid, 2013. Coautor.
- Educación y psicoanálisis, en el libro Terminología científico-social. Anexo, Ed. Anthropos, Barcelona, 1991. Román Reyes editor, pp. 144-148.
- Feminismo y teorías del género, en el libro Filosofías del siglo XX, Ed. Síntesis, Madrid, 2006. Paco Vidarte editor, pp. 315-320.
- El mascle vulnerable, en el libro Masculinitats per al segle XXI, Ed. CEDIC, Barcelona, 2007, pp. 148-159.
- El contexto sociopolítico de surgimiento de la teoría queer. De la crisis del sida a Foucault, en el libro Teoría queer, EGALES, Madrid, 2005. Córdoba, Sáez, Vidarte editores, pp. 62-70.
- Excesos de la masculinidad. la cultura leather y la cultura de los osos. En el libro El eje del mal es heterosexual, Ed. Traficantes de Sueños, Madrid, 2005. Varias autoras, pp. 137-149.
- Analidad y políticas del sexo. En el libro Diversidad sexual, APA Editorial, Buenos Aires, 2011. Varias autoras.
- Las políticas del SIDA y la cultura bear desde una perspectiva "interseccional". En el libro Intersecciones. Cuerpos y sexualidades en la encrucijada. Raquel (Lucas) Platero (ed.). Edicions Bellaterra, Barcelona, 2012. Varias autoras, pp. 199-217. ISBN 978-84-7290-603-7.
- Genero ariketak. Feminismoaren subjektuak. EDO! Argitaletxea, 2013. Varias autoras (en euskera). 2013. ISBN 978-84-940489-5-1.
- "Caos y tiempo, Revista Archipiélago nº 13, 1993, pp. 93-98".
- "Entrevista a un heterosexual. Revista Debate Feminista, vol. 13, año 7. México, 1996".
- "Sida y pobreza, Revista Archipiélago nº 21, 1996, pp. 34-39". Archived from the original on 2016-03-04.
- "Los sujetos ante el mundo digital, Revista de la Red Española de I+D RedIris, nº 39, marzo 1997". 22 November 2007.
- "El sujeto excluido, Revista Archipiélago nº 23, 1997, pp. 22-34". Archived from the original on 2016-03-04.
- Masculinidades y cambio social, revista Viento Sur, nº 146, junio 2016, pp. 69 – 73. "http://vientosur.info/spip.php?article11460"
- Coordinador/editor de los Informes Anuales "Discriminación y Comunidad Gitana" años 2012, 2013, 2014, 2015 y 2016. Fundación Secretariado Gitano. https://www.gitanos.org/upload/85/61/interior_discriminacion_2016_web.pdf
- Bustos con bustos. Mitologías del presente. ICAS Sevilla, 2017. ISBN 978-84-9102-046-2
- Normal es un programa de mi lavadora, Letras Lacanianas nº 13, 2017. Madrid.
- Metro LGBTIQ de Madrid. Exposición en CentroCentro 2017. El Porvenir de la revuelta. https://javiersaezdelalamo.wordpress.com/2016/03/05/mapa-de-metro-de-activistas-lgbt/
- Queer, heterofuturibilidad, bareback, en el libro Barbarismos queer y otras esdrújulas, de Platero, L, Ortega, E. y Rosón, M. Editions Bellaterra, Barcelona, 2017. ISBN 978-84-7290-829-1
- Queer Aging and Queering Age: Bear Culture and the Transmission of Knowledge Between Generations. GLQ (2025) 31 (4): 535–542. https://doi.org/10.1215/10642684-11978258
- El diálogo entre psicoanálisis, feminismo y deseo lesbiano en la obra de Teresa de Lauretis. Revista de la Asociación Española de Neuropsiquiatría. Vol. 45. Num. 140. July–December 2025.

== Translated works ==
- De Lauretis, T. (2026), La práctica del amor. Sexualidad lesbiana y deseo perverso. Ed. Bellaterra.
- bell hooks, (2026), Pensar el arte. Ed. Paidós.
- bell hooks, (2026), Tipos duros. Ed. Bellaterra.
- De Lauretis, T. (2025), Figuras de resistencia. Ed. Kaótica. ISBN 979-13-990046-6-3
- Ahmed, Sara (2024), Sujetos obstinados. Ed. Bellaterra. 978-84-19160-86-7.
- Wittig, M. (2024), El pensamiento heterosexual, Ed. Paidós. 978-84-493-4192-2.
- Kurtić, V., (2023), Džuvljarke. La existencia lesbiana de las mujeres romaníes Ed. Altramuz. 978-84-122780-8-8.
- Chitty, C., (2023), Hegemonía sexual. Política, sodomía y capital en el surgimiento del sistema mundial. Ed. Traficantes de Sueños. 978-84-19833-05-1.
- García-Lamarca, M., (2023), Préstamos fallidos, personas fallidas. Ed. Bellaterra. 978-84-19160-35-5
- O'Neill, Quarmby, (2023), Ossiri y el Bala Mengro, Ed. Altramuz, 9788412278071.
- McNeill, J., et al. (2022), Misión dislexia. Ed. Bellaterra. 978-84-18723-58-2.
- Silverberg, C., Smyth, F. (2022), Hablemos de sexo. Ed. Bellaterra. 978-84-18723-53-7.
- Jasbir K. Puar (2022), El derecho a mutilar. Debilidad, capacidad, discapacidad. Ed. Bellaterra. 978-84-19160-10-2.
- Kocze, A, Zentai, V, Jovanovic, J, Vincze, V. (2022), El movimiento de mujeres romaníes, Ed. Kaótica, 978-84-124055-7-6.
- Jules Gill-Peterson (2022), Historias de la infancia trans, Bellaterra, 978-84-19160-03-4.
- bell hooks (2021), El deseo de cambiar. Hombres, masculinidad y amor, Bellaterra, 978-84-18684-40-1.
- Keeanga-Yamahtta Taylor (ed.), (2021), Cómo nos liberamos. El Feminismo Negro y el Colectivo Combahee River, Bellaterra, 978-84-18684-37-1.
- Malatino, Hil, (2021), Cuidados trans, Bellaterra, 978-84-18684-15-9.
- McRuer, Robert, (2021), Teoría crip. Signos culturales de lo queer y de la discapacidad, Ed. Kaótica Libros, 978-84-122129-9-0.
- Cortés, I., End, M. (2021), "Antigitanismo. 13 miradas". Traficantes de Sueños. 978-84-122762-7-5.
- Gao, Mobo (2021), Construyendo China. Visiones enfrentadas sobre la República Popular China, Bellaterra, 978-84-18723-06-3.
- The Care Collective (2021), El manifiesto de los cuidados, Bellaterra, 978-84-18684-07-4.
- Halberstam, Jack (2020), Criaturas salvajes. El desorden del deseo. EGALES. 978–84-18501-14-2
- Lewis, Holly (2020), La política de todes. Feminismo, teoría queer y marxismo en la intersección. Bellaterra. 978-84-122750-1-8
- Ahmed, Sara (2020), ¿Para qué sirve? Sobre los usos del uso, Bellaterra, 978-84-7290-989-2.
- Gopinath, Gayatri (2020), Visiones rebeldes. Las prácticas estéticas de la diáspora queer, Bellaterra, 978-84-7290-971-7.
- bell hooks y Stuart Hall (2020), Funk sin límites. Bellaterra. 978 84 7290 959 5.
- Kimball, A. (2020), La semilla, Bellaterra. 978 84 7290 964 9.
- Cory Silberberg y Fiona Smyth (2019), Cómo se hace una criatura. Bellaterra. 978 84 7290 954 0.
- Riley Snorton, C., (2019) Negra por los cuatro costados. Una historia racial de la identidad trans. Bellaterra. 978 84 7290 936 6.
- Comisaria de Derechos Humanos del Consejo de Europa. (2019) Vidas salvadas. Derechos protegidos. Superar los problemas en la protección a los refugiados y migrantes en el Mediterráneo.
- Owl y Fox Fisher (2019), Guía de supervivencia para adolescentes trans. Bellaterra. 978 84 7290 934 2.
- Sara Ahmed (2019), Fenomenología queer. Orientaciones, objetos, otros. Bellaterra. 978 84 7290 926 7.
- Cory Silberberg y Fiona Smyth (2019), Sexo es una palabra divertida. Bellaterra. 978 84 7290 923 6.
- Jack Halberstam (2018). Trans*. Una guía rápida y peculiar de la variabilidad de género. Egales. ISBN 978-84-17319328.
- Ann Cvetkovich (2018). Un archivo de sentimientos. Trauma, sexualidad y culturas públicas lesbianas. Bellaterra. ISBN 978-84-72908932.
- Jack Halberstam (2018). El arte queer del fracaso. Egales. ISBN 978-84-16491-99-5.
- Lee Edelman (2014). No al futuro. La teoría queer y la pulsión de muerte. Egales. ISBN 978-84-15899-51-8.
- Judith (Jack) Halberstam (2008). Masculinidad femenina. Egales. ISBN 978-84-88052-64-3.
- Monique Wittig (2005). El pensamiento heterosexual. Traducción del inglés con Paco Vidarte. Egales. ISBN 84-95346-97-4.
- Judith Butler (2004). Lenguaje, poder e identidad. Síntesis. ISBN 9788497561778.
- Sami Ali (2003). El impasse relacional. Síntesis. ISBN 978-84-9756-075-7.
- Henri Paumelle (2003). La función del cuerpo en psicoterapia. Síntesis. ISBN 978-84-9756-077-1.
- Cohen de Lara, Aline; Marinov, Vladimir; Ménéchal, Jean (2003). La neurosis obsesiva. Síntesis. ISBN 978-84-9756-076-4.
