= Canary Conn =

American entertainer and author

- Born: 1949 (age 76–77)
- Occupations: Writer; musician
- Notable work: Canary: The Story of a Transsexual

Canary Conn (born 1949) is an American entertainer and author. Her memoir, Canary: The Story of a Transsexual, was one of the early notable memoirs of a self-described transsexual person, and she made numerous talk show appearances to discuss her transition in the 1970s.

== Life and career ==
Conn grew up in San Antonio, Texas and was married with a baby by 18. In 1968, Conn was the entrant sponsored by KONO-FM in a national talent show hosted by Ed Ames and Aretha Franklin titled Super Teen: The Sounds of '68. After winning best male vocalist, Conn was given a recording contract with Capitol Records as the prize. In 1969, under the name Danny O'Connor, Conn recorded four songs for Capitol, including "Imaginary Worlds" and "Ridin' Red Hood." In March of that year, Capitol released a 45 with the singles "Can You Imagine" and "If I Am Not Free."

Following a suicide attempt, Conn made her transition at age 23. She found it difficult to get subsequent work, and she only had one contact with her son in 1972 following the breakup of her marriage. In 1974, she published Canary: The Story of a Transsexual. A paperback version of her memoir was released following an appearance on The Merv Griffin Show. Conn also appeared on Tomorrow and The Phil Donahue Show. She later discontinued her media appearances and founded a small business.

== Publications ==
- O'Connor, Danny (1969). If I Am Not Free / Can You Imagine. 7-inch 45, Capitol 2441
- Conn, Canary (1974). Canary: The Story of a Transsexual. Nash, ISBN 9780840213457
