= Talia Mae Bettcher =

Canadian philosopher and professor (born 1966)

- Born: October 8, 1966 (age 60); Calgary, Alberta, Canada

Education
- Thesis: The spirit and the heap : Berkeley and Hume on the self and self-consciousness (1999)
- Website: www.taliamaebettcher.com

Talia Mae Bettcher is a Canadian professor of philosophy known for her interdisciplinary work in the field of transgender studies.

== Early life and education ==
Bettcher was born in Calgary, Alberta, Canada, on October 8, 1966, and raised in an evangelical Christian family. She obtained a PhD in philosophy from University of California, Los Angeles at UCLA completing a thesis titled "The spirit and the heap : Berkeley and Hume on the self and self-consciousness" in 1999.

== Academic career ==
Bettcher spent 26 years at Cal State Los Angeles as a professor of philosophy. During her time at Cal State she served as chair of the department and was recognized by Cal State with an Outstanding Professor Award during the 2017-2018 academic year. In September 2026, Bettcher joined the University of Waterloo as the Eddie Goldenberg Research Chair in Gender-Based Violence Prevention and Trans Community Resilience.

== Research ==
Bettcher's work has included critique of the wrong-body narrative for its reliance on dominant understandings of sex and gender while arguing that it can be seen as a form of resistance to transphobic attempts of reality enforcement. Ultimately, she has advocated for a framework that moves beyond the wrong-body model by recognizing multiple meanings of gender and validating trans identities outside of medicalized narratives. Her book Beyond Personhood was included on the Chicago Review of Books' notable debuts by trans, nonbinary, and gender non-conforming authors in 2025. She has served as an editorial board member of Hypatia and was a founding member of the Transgender Studies Quarterly's editorial board.

== Public service ==
Bettcher served as vice-chair of the Transgender Advisory Council for the City of Los Angeles' Human Relations Commission.
