= Sandy Stone (artist) =

American artist (born 1936)

Allucquére Rosanne Stone
- Sandy Stone in 2004
- Born: c. 1936 (age 89–90); Jersey City, New Jersey, US
- Education: St. John's College (B.A.); University of California, Santa Cruz (Ph.D.)
- Known for: Media, gender studies, African-American studies
- Spouse: Jeffrey Prothero (m. 1995; died 2016)

Allucquére Rosanne "Sandy" Stone (born c. 1936) is an American academic theorist, media theorist, author, and performance artist. She is an Associate Professor Emerita at the University of Texas at Austin where she was the Founding Director of the Advanced Communication Technologies Laboratory (ACTLab) and the New Media Initiative in the department of Radio-TV-Film. Stone has worked in and written about film, music, experimental neurology, writing, engineering, and computer programming.

Stone is transgender and is considered a founder of the academic discipline of transgender studies. On March 5, 2024, she became the first openly transgender woman inducted into the National Women's Hall of Fame, in a ceremony in New York City. In Stone's acceptance speech she spoke of "Trans vision: To learn to see, and then to be a light by which others can see."

== Early life and career ==
Stone was born in Jersey City, New Jersey around 1936. She is Jewish, descended from European immigrants.

Stone has stated that she disliked formal education and preferred auditing classes with university professors whose work she admired. She graduated early from high school and took classes at MIT and worked at Bell Telephone Laboratories, where she worked on touch-tone system projects. She later graduated from St. John's College in Annapolis, Maryland, receiving a B.A. in 1965.

=== Recording engineer, science fiction, and computing ===
In the late 1960s Stone moved to New York City and embarked on a career as a recording engineer, initially at the Record Plant, where she was first hired to repair equipment. Some of Stone's recording work is credited under pseudonyms Sandy Fisher or Doc Storch, including work with Mississippi John Hurt, The Byrds, Van Morrison, and Graham Nash. In 1969, Stone wrote about an April 7 recording session at Record Plant Studios with Jimi Hendrix for Zygote magazine. According to journalist David S. Bennahum, Stone "used to wear a long black cape and full beard."

=== Beginning transition ===
In 1969, she moved to the West Coast, where she continued to work as a recording engineer for artists including the Grateful Dead.

She also began trying to get information about gender transition. She says that she understood herself to be a girl from a young age, but she did not see Christine Jorgensen as a model. Once in California, seeking resources, she was referred to the National Transsexual Counseling Unit of the San Francisco Police Department. There, a peer counselor named Jan Maxwell, took Stone around the Tenderloin to show her the trans women who "had gotten stuck, people with bad surgery, electrolysis-scarred faces. People who had dead-ended, gone crazy. Unbelievable poverty, despair," then took her back to her office and said "'You still want to do that?'". She did, but a car accident delayed her transition.

In the early 1970s, Stone published several science fiction pieces under the pen name Sandy Fisher in The Magazine of Fantasy & Science Fiction and Galaxy Science Fiction.

In 1974 Stone withdrew from mainstream recording, settled in Santa Cruz, California, and publicly transitioned, beginning estrogen and undergoing electrolysis. The name "Allucquére" comes from a character in her friend Robert A. Heinlein's novel, The Puppet Masters (1951). She worked repairing stereos and, after being fired for disclosing her transition, eventually opening her own repair shop, Wizard of Aud. She was recruited to the Olivia Records collective, a popular women's music label, on the recommendation of Leslie Ann Jones.She was Olivia's sound engineer from ca. 1974-1978, recording and mixing all Olivia product during this period.

=== Attacks by Janice Raymond in The Transsexual Empire and surgical transition ===
In 1976, the group received a letter from the lesbian feminist scholar Janice Raymond, then a Ph.D. student at Boston College, supervised by Mary Daly. Raymond had sent a draft of a dissertation chapter attacking Stone to the collective "for comment," apparently in anticipation of outing Stone. Raymond appeared unaware that Stone had informed the collective of her transgender status before agreeing to join. The collective did return comments to Raymond, suggesting that her description of transgender people and of Stone's place in and effect on the collective was at odds with the reality of the collective's interaction with Stone. They also defended Stone in feminist publications, writing in an open letter to Sister magazine, “Sandy Stone is a person, not an issue."

Following the book's publication, a group of Chicago-based feminists came to confront the Olivia collective at a community meeting in San Francisco. At the time, no one knew that Stone had not yet had surgery. In the wake of that meeting, the group provided funding so that she could have surgery secretly, immediately before the label began a West Coast tour. She underwent gender reassignment with Donald Laub at the Stanford Gender Dysphoria Program in Palo Alto, though the surgery was conducted at San Mateo General Hospital because of a lawsuit that had stopped gender confirmation surgeries at Stanford Hospital. Stone was forced to stay in the hospital's prison ward.

On tour, however, Stone received death threats from members of the lesbian separatist group the Gorgons, who came armed to a Seattle concert, though they were stopped by security. Following the threat of a boycott of the label, Stone decided to leave the collective in 1978 and return to Santa Cruz.

Raymond's The Transsexual Empire: The Making of the She-Male was published in 1979. Raymond accused Stone by name of plotting to destroy the Olivia Records collective and womanhood in general with "male energy." The book dramatically increased her transphobic attack on Stone:

Masculine behavior is notably obtrusive. It is significant that transsexually constructed lesbian feminists have inserted themselves into positions of importance and/or performance in the feminist community. Sandy Stone, the transsexual engineer with Olivia Records, an "all-women" recording company, illustrates this well. Stone is not only crucial to the Olivia enterprise but plays a very dominant role there. The ... visibility he [she] achieved in the aftermath of the Olivia controversy ... only serves to enhance his [her] previously dominant role and to divide women, as men frequently do, when they make their presence necessary and vital to women. As one woman wrote: "I feel raped when Olivia passes off Sandy ... as a real woman. After all his [her] male privilege, is he [she] going to cash in on lesbian feminist culture too?"

In the early 1980s, Stone built a small computer, taught herself programming, and became a freelance coder, eventually becoming recognized as a computer expert.

== Academic career ==
=== The Empire Strikes Back: A Posttranssexual Manifesto ===
In 1983 Stone befriended cultural theorist Donna Haraway, a faculty member in the History of Consciousness program at UC Santa Cruz; Haraway was in the process of writing the watershed essay "A Cyborg Manifesto." Stone was a student in the program from 1987-1993 and produced "The Empire Strikes Back: A Posttranssexual Manifesto" as a first-year project. The work was influenced by early versions of Haraway's "A Cyborg Manifesto" and by the turbulent political foment in cultural feminism of that period. It was presented at a conference in 1988, where, Stone recalled, "People stood up and were cheering. I hadn’t seen anything like that, or expected it.” "Empire" was first published in 1991. Susan Stryker and Stephen Whittle situate Stone's work in the turbulent events of the time as a response to Raymond's attack:

Stone exacts her revenge more than a decade later, not by waging an anti-feminist counterattack on Raymond, but by undermining the foundationalist assumptions that support Raymond's narrower concept of womanhood, and by claiming a speaking position for transsexuals that cannot be automatically dismissed as damaged, deluded, second-rate, or somehow inherently compromised.

An important point of the essay was that transgender persons were ill-served by hiding their status, and that coming out—which Stone called "reading oneself aloud"—would inevitably lead to self-empowerment. Thus "The Empire Strikes Back" re-articulated what was at the time a radical gay-lesbian political statement into a transgender voice. During this period, mainstream gay and lesbian activists generally suppressed transgender issues and visible transgender activists, fearing that they would frighten the uncertain and still shaky liberal base during a delicate period of consolidation. "The Empire Strikes Back" galvanized young transgender scholars and focused their attention on the need for self-assertion within a largely reactionary institutional structure. "The Empire Strikes Back" later became the center of an extensive citation network of transgender academics and a foundational work for transgender researchers and theorists. Stryker and Whittle, writing in The Transgender Studies Reader, refer to "The Empire Strikes Back" as:

the protean text from which contemporary transgender studies emerged ... In the wake of (the) article, a gradual but steady body of new academic and creative work by transgender people has gradually taken shape, which has enriched virtually every academic and artistic discipline with new critical perspectives on gender.

=== Graduate school and dissertation ===
At Haraway's suggestion, Stone visited University of California, San Diego campus as an exchange student in the newly formed Science Studies program. Following a dispute between progressive and conservative faculty factions, Stone was offered a job as Instructor in the Department of Sociology, teaching courses in sociology, anthropology, political science, English, communications, and the experimental program "The Making of the Modern World."

Stone received her doctorate in 1993. Her dissertation, "Presence", which Haraway supervised, was published in 1995 by MIT Press as The War of Desire and Technology at the Close of the Mechanical Age. Stone described the work as "creat(ing) a discourse which contains all the elements of the original discourse but which is quite different from it ... remember that at heart I am a narrator, a shameless teller of stories." In the years following the book's publication, several major social science departments fractured into separate departments along lines that in part came to be drawn by reference to Desire and Technology and other, similar publications.

=== UT Austin ===
In 1992, she took an appointment as an assistant professor at the University of Texas, Austin. While professor at UT Austin, she concurrently served as the Wolfgang Kohler Professor of Media and Performance at the European Graduate School EGS, a senior artist at the Banff Centre, and Humanities Research Institute Fellow at the University of California, Irvine.

=== ACTLab ===
Beginning in 1993, Stone established the New Media program she named ACTLab (Advanced Communication Technologies Laboratory) in the Radio-Television-Film department. This work, and research in virtual communities, social software, and novel methods of presenting academic topics, drew wide attention, and contributed to the establishment and legitimation of what is now generally called New Media Art.

=== Protests against Stone & post-tenure conditions ===
Stone's work and presence in the RTF department has been bitterly contested by powerful conservative faculty members, who have repeatedly tried to remove or marginalize her. In 1998 this small but vocal group issued a negative departmental report recommending that Stone be denied tenure. The university overruled this report, citing Stone's contributions to multiple fields and reaffirming its commitment to original or unusual scholarship.

Granting Stone tenure had the negative effect of provoking attacks on her work and credibility by powerful conservative faculty within the RTF department, which for years has responded to inquiries with the statement that there is no New Media program or program called ACTLab within the department. (Based on university course listings and rosters, as of 2007 there were approximately 70 ACTLab students in active courses, 400 former students, and 2500 student webpages on the ACTLab website. The program attracts students from a broad range of departments and from other institutions.) In a 2006 talk at Arizona State University, Stone compared the RTF department's attempts to erase her work and presence to previous efforts by conservative administrators to deny voice to any unfamiliar or emergent disciplines or unusual people, and said it was merely to be expected.

In the 1990s she gave several highly publicized interviews during which she suggested that the era of academic scholarship, as the term was generally understood, was over:

I think that in most ways the university as we now know it is already dead. But the present university system has a nervous system like a dinosaur -- when you chop off the tail it takes awhile for the head to realize that something's gone wrong. In 1999, through electronic media such as the Web, a great deal of information is available through other sources than books. Universities can go on pretending for a long time that they are still the major sources of knowledge in our culture because in a sense they are the final arbiters of what the contents of books mean - even though most people are getting their information from somewhere else, and assigning their own meanings to what they read and see.

Since that time, although Stone continued to tour extensively, to present "theoryperformances" and formal theatrical performances, and to address her work to a wide variety of audiences across broad sampling of disciplines and skills, she has published less and less in print journals. This reached the extent that a group of her students took up the practice of recording, transcribing and printing her in-class lectures for their own use.

=== Retirement from academia ===
In 2010 Stone retired from her position at the University of Texas, becoming Professor Emerita and continuing her ACTLab work outside of UT Austin by launching several programs based on the ACTLab model, most notably the ACTLab@EGS program at the European Graduate School in Saas-Fee, Switzerland. The ACTLab pedagogical model brought her international recognition; subsequently the ACTLab framework for education in the arts and technology has been adopted by many other programs such as the Entertainment Technology Center at Carnegie Mellon University in Pittsburgh and the New Media Innovation Lab at Arizona State University at Tempe.

=== Performance art, theater, and film ===
In 1999, she appeared in Gendernauts: A Journey Through Shifting Identities, a film by Monika Treut featuring Texas Tomboy, Susan Stryker, and Hida Viloria, a group of artists in San Francisco who live between the poles of conventional gender identities.

In 2006, Stone began touring a theatrical performance titled The Neovagina Monologues, modeled on the work of Spalding Gray, although the title is a tribute to a work by Eve Ensler.

== Influence ==
As of 2007, "The Empire Strikes Back" had been translated into twenty-seven languages and had been cited in hundreds of publications. Per the founder of the publication, it also provided the inspiration for TransSisters: The Journal of Transsexual Feminism.

In 2011, Indiana University Bloomington hosted a conference honoring the twentieth anniversary of the publication of "The Empire Strikes Back". Stone was guest of honor, and while onstage commented "Last year I was invited to a conference about my work on four days' notice. I asked why they waited until the last minute, and they said they would have invited me sooner, but because I was considered a founder of the field they assumed I was dead. I'm not."

In 2024, she became the first openly transgender woman inducted into the National Women's Hall of Fame.

== Personal life ==
During online virtual community research in 1994 Stone met Jeffrey Prothero (Cynbe ru Taren), a researcher, programmer and virtual worlds creator, who authored Citadel, an influential bulletin board system. Stone and Prothero were married in 1995. He died of cancer in 2016. Stone and ru Taren divided their time between Santa Cruz and Austin. His extended family and her daughter also live in Santa Cruz.

== Selected publications ==
- "The Empire Strikes Back: A Posttranssexual Manifesto," in Kristina Straub and Julia Epstein, eds.: Body Guards: The Cultural Politics of Gender Ambiguity (New York: Routledge, 1991).
- "Will The Real Body Please Stand Up?: Boundary Stories About Virtual Cultures", in Michael Benedikt, ed., Cyberspace: First Steps (Cambridge, 1991: MIT Press)
- "Sex, Death, and Architecture", in Architecture- New York (New York 1992: ANY)
- "Virtual Systems", in Jonathan Crary and Sanford Kwinter, eds., ZONE 6: Incorporations (Cambridge 1993: MIT Press)
- "The Architecture of Elsewhere", in Hraszthan Zeitlian (ed.), Semiotext(e) Architecture (New York 1993: Semiotext(e))
- "The Empire Strikes Back: A Posttranssexual Manifesto", in Kristina Straub and Julia Epstein, eds., Body Guards: The Cultural Politics of Sexual Ambiguity (New York: Routledge 1991), extensively reprinted in other publications. (This essay is frequently cited as the origin of the academic field known as Transgender Studies.) Available online at sandystone.com: The Empire Strikes Back: A Posttranssexual Manifesto
- The War of Desire and Technology at the Close of the Mechanical Age (Cambridge 1996: MIT Press)
- "The Langley Circuit", in Galaxy (as Sandy Fisher) May 1972
- "Farewell to the Artifacts", in Galaxy (as Sandy Fisher) July 1972
- "Thank God You're Alive", in The Magazine of Fantasy and Science Fiction (as Sandy Fisher) October 1971
- "Cyberdammerung at Wellspring Systems", in Marianne Moser and Douglas MacLeod, eds., Immersed In Technology: Art and Virtual Environments (Cambridge, Mass., 1996: MIT Press)
- "Sex and Death Among the Disembodied: VR, Cyberspace, and the Nature of Academic Discourse", in Susan Leigh Star, ed.: Cultures of Computing (Chicago, 1995: University of Chicago Press)
- "Identity in Oshkosh", in Judith Halberstam and Ira Livingston, eds.: Posthuman Bodies (Bloomington, Indiana, 1995: Indiana University Press)
- "Violation and Virtuality: Two Cases of Physical and Psychological Boundary Transgression and Their Implications", in Judith Halberstam and Ira Livingston, eds.: Posthuman Bodies (Bloomington, Indiana, 1995: Indiana University Press)
- "Split Subjects, Not Atoms, or How I Fell In Love With My Prosthesis", in Roddey Reid, ed.: Configurations, special issue: Located Knowledges (Baltimore, Maryland, 1994: Johns Hopkins University Press)
