= Janice Raymond =

American author, professor, and activist (born 1943)

- Born: Janice G. Raymond; January 24, 1943 (age 83); Rhode Island, U.S.
- Education: Salve Regina University (BA); Andover Newton Theological School; Boston College (PhD)
- Occupations: Author; professor; activist
- Employer: University of Massachusetts Amherst
- Known for: Feminist activism
- Notable work: The Transsexual Empire (1979)
- Website: janiceraymond.com

Janice G. Raymond (born January 24, 1943) is an American radical feminist and professor emerita of women's studies and medical ethics at the University of Massachusetts Amherst. She is known for her work against violence, sexual exploitation, and medical abuse of women, and for also her work denouncing transsexuality.

Raymond is the author of five books, including The Transsexual Empire (1979). She has published numerous articles on prostitution and lectures internationally on many of these topics via the Coalition Against Trafficking in Women. Her opposition to rights for trans women have been criticized by some in the LGBT and feminist communities as transphobic.

== Early life ==
Janice G. Raymond was born in 1943 to a white working-class family in Rhode Island. Her father was a factoryworker and her mother was a bookkeeper and secretary who took occasional jobs and adjusted the family budget to send Janice to a Catholic girls' school. After graduating high school in 1960, Raymond joined the Sisters of Mercy, a Roman Catholic religious congregation, and stayed for 12 years. Raymond received a BA in English literature from Salve Regina College in 1965, a master's degree in religious studies from Andover Newton Theological School in 1971, and her PhD in ethics and society from Boston College in 1977.

== Academic career ==
Raymond is professor emerita of women's studies and medical ethics at the University of Massachusetts Amherst. She was a faculty member at the University of Massachusetts in Amherst from 1978 on. When she retired from the university in 2002, the Boston Globe included her among the several "marquee talents" lost to the campus.

Since 2000, Raymond has also served as an adjunct professor of international health at Boston University School of Public Health. She has been a faculty member of the Five Colleges (Amherst College, Hampshire College, Mount Holyoke College, Smith College and the University of Massachusetts Amherst) Professor of Women's Studies and Medical Ethics (1975–78), visiting research scholar at the Massachusetts Institute of Technology (1990–91), visiting professor at the University of Linkoping in Sweden (1995), and lecturer at the Sunan Kalijaga State Islamic University, Center for Women Studies, Yogyakarta, Indonesia (2002).

== Advocacy work ==
From 1994 to 2007, Raymond was the co-executive director of the Coalition Against Trafficking in Women (CATW). She is currently on the board of directors of CATW.

During her tenure, CATW expanded its international work, especially in the Baltics and in Eastern Europe.

In January 2004, Raymond testified before the European Parliament on "The Impact of the Sex Industry in the EU." In 2003, Raymond testified before a subcommittee of the United States Congress on "The Ongoing Tragedy of International Slavery and Human Trafficking." She was an NGO member of the U.S. Delegation to the Asian Regional Initiative Against the Trafficking of Women and Children (ARIAT), Manila, the Philippines, hosted by the governments of the Philippines and the United States. In 1999–2000, as an NGO representative to the UN Transnational Crime Committee, in Vienna, she helped define the UN Protocol to Prevent, Suppress and Punish Trafficking in Persons, especially Women and Children, supplementing the UN Convention Against Transnational Organized Crime.

== Personal life ==
Raymond is a former member of the Sisters of Mercy. She left the convent and became open about her lesbianism. As of 2016, she and her partner, Pat Hynes, had been together for 42 years.

== Awards and honors ==
In 2007, Raymond received the "International Woman Award, 2007" from the Zero Tolerance Trust, in Glasgow, Scotland.

In 1986, Raymond's book A Passion for Friends: a Philosophy of Female Friendship was named the best non-fiction book of the year by the UK magazine, City Limits.

Raymond has been the recipient of grants from the U.S. Department of State, the U.S. National Institute of Justice, the Ford Foundation, the United States Information Agency, the National Science Foundation, the Norwegian Organization for Research and Development (NORAD), and UNESCO.

== Publications ==
In her 1993 book, Women as Wombs: Reproductive Technologies and the Battle over Women's Freedom, Raymond examined how reducing infertility to a disease in the West has helped to promote the use of new reproductive technologies such as in-vitro fertilization and surrogacy. At the same time, women's fertility is rejected in the East promoting technologies of forced sterilization, sex predetermination and female feticide. The book was one of the first to look at the international reproductive trafficking of women and children as organized by the adoption, organ and surrogacy trade.

Women as Wombs, as K. Kaufman wrote in the San Francisco Chronicle, "is a strongly written, carefully reasoned critique of ... 'reproductive liberalism'." Beverly Miller of Library Journal stated that "... it is hard to resist her conclusion that many reproductive experiments can represent another form of violence against women."

Raymond's 1986 book, A Passion for Friends: a Philosophy of Female Affection, deviates from her work on medical technologies into the realm of feminist friendship as a basis for a broader feminist theory and politics. Carolyn Heilbrun in The Women's Review of Books wrote: "Hers is a brave undertaking, and she begins by facing the central issue of women's friendships: the necessary relation of these friendships to power and the public sphere...Raymond's is the most probing and honorable discussion of female friendships we have ...". Published also in a UK edition, A Passion for Friends received the City Limits award for the Best Non-Fiction Book of 1986. Novelist Jeanette Winterson wrote that "It's a complex, food-for thought book that rewards the time and concentration that it needs."

=== Writings on transsexualism and transgender issues ===
In 1979, Raymond published a book on transsexualism called The Transsexual Empire: The Making of the She-Male. Controversial even today, it looked at the role of transsexualism – particularly psychological and surgical approaches to it – in reinforcing traditional gender stereotypes, the ways in which the medical-psychiatric complex is medicalizing "gender identity" and the social and political context that has helped spawn transsexual treatment and surgery as normal and therapeutic medicine.

Raymond maintains that transsexualism is based on the "patriarchal myths" of "male mothering," and "making of woman according to man's image." She claims this is done in order "to colonize feminist identification, culture, politics and sexuality," adding: "All transsexuals rape women's bodies by reducing the real female form to an artifact, appropriating this body for themselves ... Transsexuals merely cut off the most obvious means of invading women, so that they seem non-invasive." In 2014, Raymond expressed regret for having made this comparison, stating that "rape was not a proper metaphor because it minimized the distinct meaning of rape."

These views on transsexuality have been criticized by many in the LGBT and feminist communities as transphobic and as constituting hate-speech against transsexual men and women.

In The Transsexual Empire, Raymond includes sections on Sandy Stone, a trans woman who had worked as a sound engineer for Olivia Records, and Christy Barsky, accusing both of creating divisiveness in women's spaces. These writings have been heavily criticized as personal attacks on these individuals. In response, Stone wrote her 1987 essay, "The Empire Strikes Back: A Posttranssexual Manifesto".

In 2021, Raymond's Doublethink: A Feminist Challenge to Transgenderism was published. A positive review by Claire Heuchan was published in the gender critical publication Lesbian and Gay News. Heuchan wrote, "With a directness that is characteristic of her work, Raymond cuts through the culture of fear and intellectual dishonesty that defines many discussions around gender identity.

=== Writings on prostitution and sex trafficking ===
In 2000, Raymond co-published a study on sex trafficking in the United States entitled Sex Trafficking in the United States: Links Between International and Domestic Sex Industries. In 2002, she directed and co-authored a multi-country project in the Philippines, Indonesia, Thailand, Venezuela and the United States, entitled Women in the International Migration Process: Patterns, Profiles and Health Consequences of Sexual Exploitation.

Among the many articles she has published, her work entitled "Ten Reasons for Not Legalizing Prostitution and a Legal Response to the Demand for Prostitution" has been translated into over 10 languages. This essay looks at the legislative models that have legalized or decriminalized the prostitution industry and the rationales supporting them, and argues that legitimating the sex trade has made its harm to women invisible. Raymond supports the alternative legal model of rejecting legalization and decriminalization of the sex industry, and penalizing buyers of sex while not arresting prostitutes.

== Bibliography ==
=== Books ===
- ——— (1979). The Transsexual Empire. Boston, Massachusetts: Beacon Press. ISBN 9780807021644. Reprinted by Teachers College, Columbia University, New York; Editions du Seuil, Paris (1994).
- with Leidholdt, Dorchen, eds. (1990). The sexual liberals and the attack on feminism. New York: Pergamon Press. ISBN 9780807762394.
- with Dumble, Lynette J. (1991). RU 486: misconceptions, myths and morals. Melbourne / Hamburg / Dhaka, Bangladesh: Spinifex Press / Konkret Literatur Verlag / Narigrantha Prabartan. ISBN 9781742198446.
- ——— (1993). Women as wombs: reproductive technologies and the battle over women's freedom. San Francisco / Melbourne / Munich: Harper / Spinifex Press / Frauenoffensive. ISBN 9780062508997.
- ——— (1996). A passion for friends: toward a philosophy of female affection. Boston / London / Munich: Beacon Press / The Women's Press / Frauenoffensive. ISBN 9780807067246. Reprinted by Spinifex Press, Melbourne (2001).
- with Hughes, Donna M.; Gomez, Carol (March 2001). Sex trafficking of women in the United States: international and domestic trends. Kingston, Rhode Island: Coalition Against Trafficking in Women. Archived from the original on March 11, 2018. Pdf.
- ——— (2002). A Comparative Study of Women Trafficked in the Migration Process: Patterns, Profiles and Health Consequences of Sexual Exploitation in Five Countries (Indonesia, the Philippines, Thailand, Venezuela and the United States). Coalition Against Trafficking in Women. OCLC 50414499.
- ——— (2021). Doublethink: A Feminist Challenge to Transgenderism. Spinifex Press. ISBN 9781925950380.

=== Book chapters ===
- Raymond, Janice G. (1999). "Class matters: Yes it does". In Zmroczek, Christine; Mahony, Pat (eds.). Women and social class – international feminist perspectives. London: University College Press, (Taylor and Francis Group). pp. 105–113. ISBN 9781857289299.
- Raymond, Janice G.; Hynes, H. Patricia (2002). "Put in harm's way: The health consequences of sex trafficking in the United States". In Silliman, Jael; Bhattacharjee, Anannya (eds.). Policing the national body: Race, gender, and criminalization. Boston: South End Press. pp. 197–229.
- Raymond, Janice G. (2004). "Ten reasons for not legalizing prostitution and a legal response to the demand for prostitution". In Farley, Melissa (ed.). Prostitution, trafficking and traumatic stress. Binghamton: Haworth Press. pp. 315–332. Translated into many languages including French, German, Italian, Spanish, Portuguese, Finnish, Norwegian, Hungarian, Estonian, Bulgarian, Croatian, Romanian, Russian and Hindi.

=== Articles ===
- ——— (April 11, 1993). "RU 486: Miracle drug turns nasty". Los Angeles Times. pp. M5.
- ——— (1995). Report to the United Nations special rapporteur on violence against women: Prostitution and trafficking. Coalition Against Trafficking in Women.
- ——— (December 11, 1995). "Perspective on human rights: Prostitution is rape that's paid for". Los Angeles Times. pp. B6.
- ——— (January–February 1998). "Prostitution as violence against women: NGO stonewalling in Beijing and elsewhere". Women's Studies International Forum. 21 (1): 1–9. doi:10.1016/S0277-5395(96)00102-1.
- ——— (September–October 2002). "The new UN trafficking protocol". Women's Studies International Forum. 25 (5): 491–502. doi:10.1016/S0277-5395(02)00320-5.
- ——— (January 2004). "Ten reasons for not legalizing prostitution and a legal response to the demand for prostitution". Journal of Trauma Practice. 2 (3–4): 315–332. doi:10.1300/J189v02n03_17. S2CID 168039341.
- ——— (October 2004). "Prostitution on demand: Legalizing the buyers as sexual consumers". Violence Against Women. 10 (10): 1156–1186. doi:10.1177/1077801204268609. S2CID 73405101.
