= The Transsexual Empire =

1979 book by Janice Raymond

The Transsexual Empire: The Making of the She-Male
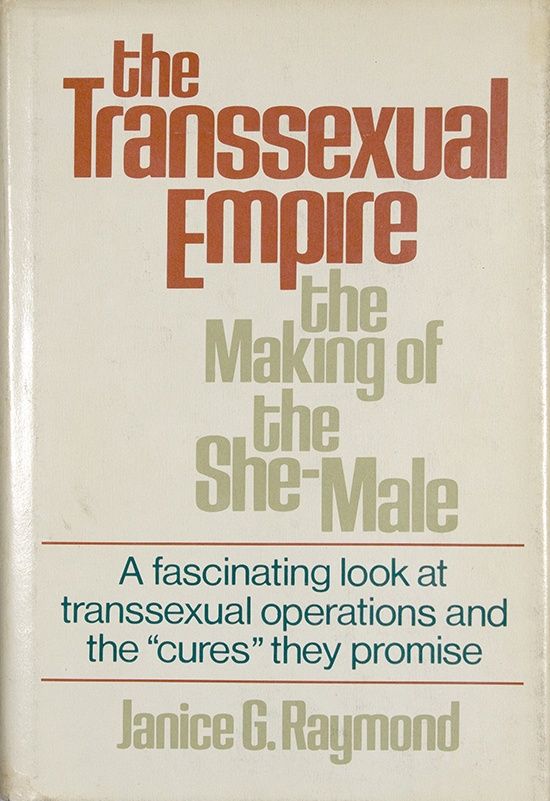
- Cover of the first edition
- Author: Janice Raymond
- Language: English
- Subjects: Gender dysphoria, trans people, radical feminism
- Publisher: Beacon Press
- Publication date: 1979
- Publication place: United States
- Media type: Print (hardcover and paperback)
- Pages: 220
- ISBN: 0-807-02164-4
- OCLC: 4529467
- Dewey Decimal: 301.415
- LC Class: RC560.C4

The Transsexual Empire: The Making of the She-Male is a 1979 book about sex-role-stereotyping by American radical feminist author and activist Janice Raymond. The book is derived from Raymond's dissertation, which was produced under the supervision of the feminist theologian Mary Daly. It has been criticized by some LGBT and feminist writers as transphobic and dehumanizing.

== Summary ==
Raymond investigates the role of gender in society—particularly psychological and surgical approaches to treatment of transgender people—and argues that transgender identity reifies traditional gender stereotypes. Raymond also writes about the ways in which the medical-psychiatric complex medicalizes gender identity and about the social and political context that has helped spawn gender-affirming treatment and surgery as normal and therapeutic medicine.

Raymond maintains that the notion of transgender identity is based on the "patriarchal myths" of "male mothering" and "making of woman according to man's image". She claims this is done in order "to colonize feminist identification, culture, politics and sexuality", adding, "All transsexuals rape women's bodies by reducing the real female form to an artifact, appropriating this body for themselves ... Transsexuals merely cut off the most obvious means of invading women, so that they seem non-invasive."

== Publication history ==
In 1979, the first edition of The Transsexual Empire was published by Beacon Press, a nonprofit publisher in Boston run by the Unitarian Universalist Association. In 1980, the book was published in the United Kingdom by The Women's Press. In 1994, a second edition was published by Teachers College Press.

== Reception ==
The Transsexual Empire was well received in mainstream media upon its publication, with psychiatrist Thomas Szasz commenting that "[the book] has rightly seized on transsexualism as an emblem of modern society's unremitting—though increasingly concealed—antifeminism." In a 1980 review, the philosopher Sarah Hoagland called it a "fecund discussion of patriarchal deception". However, Raymond's views on transgender people have been criticized by some LGBT and feminist writers as transphobic, and constituting hate speech against transgender people.

In 1980, lesbian trans feminist Carol Riddell wrote the first feminist critique of the book, a pamphlet titled Divided Sisterhood: A Critical Review of Janice Raymond’s The Transsexual Empire, which became heavily cited in trans studies. In it, Riddell builds on the earlier work of trans feminists and argues the book ran counter to the emphasis placed upon subjectivity in feminist consciousness-raising, criticized its portrayal of gender identity clinics as an empire rather than institutions marginalized by the medical patriarchy which force transsexuals to conform to gender roles and suffer, and stated the book is "dangerous to transsexuals because it does not treat us as human beings at all, merely as the tools of a theory." Riddell argued in 1996 that The Transsexual Empire "did not invent anti-transsexual prejudice, but it did more to justify and perpetuate it than perhaps any other book ever written."

The Transsexual Empire included sections on Sandy Stone, a trans woman who had worked as a sound engineer for Olivia Records, and Christy Barsky, accusing both of creating divisiveness in women's spaces. These writings have been criticized as personal attacks on these individuals; Raymond sent a draft to Olivia Records with the intention of outing Stone, apparently unaware that she had disclosed her trans status before joining Olivia Records. The collective returned comment that Raymond's description of Stone's place in and effect on the collective was at odds with the reality of the collective's interaction with Stone; after publication, the other members of the Olivia Collective defended Stone in various contemporary feminist publications. In 1987, Stone wrote "The Empire Strikes Back: A Posttranssexual Manifesto", a foundational text of transgender studies, in response to The Transsexual Empire.

Natalie Washington called The Transsexual Empire a "book [...] so influential on modern anti-trans movements, in which [Raymond] suggests 'the problem of transsexualism would best be served by morally mandating it out of existence.'"

== See also ==
- Feminist views on transgender topics
- Gender-critical feminism
