= Daniel Nicoletta =

Italian-American photographer

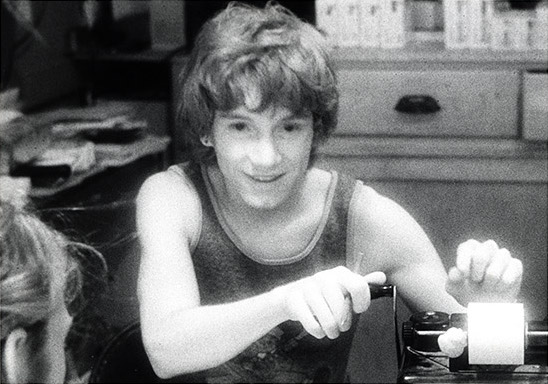
Daniel Nicoletta at Castro Camera photographed by Harvey Milk, 1976

Daniel Nicoletta (born December 23, 1954) is an American photographer, photojournalist and gay rights activist.

== Biography ==
Daniel Nicoletta was born in New York City and raised in Utica, New York. In his late teens he left New York to attend San Francisco State University, later graduating from the bachelor of arts program. He started his photographic career in 1975 as an intern to Crawford Barton, who was then a staff photographer for the national gay magazine The Advocate.

== Career ==
In 1974, when he was 19, Nicoletta first met Harvey Milk and Scott Smith at Castro Camera, their camera store on Castro Street; the following year, they hired him to work at the shop. The three became friends, and Nicoletta worked with Milk on his campaigns for political office. During this period of time, Nicoletta took many now well-known photographs of Milk. When Milk was elected to the San Francisco Board of Supervisors, he became California's first openly gay elected official; he served for almost eleven months before he and Mayor George Moscone were assassinated by Dan White at City Hall on November 27, 1978.

After Milk's death, Nicoletta worked to keep his memory alive. He was the installation coordinator of the Harvey Milk photographic tribute plaques installed at Harvey Milk Plaza and at the Castro Street Station, which featured his photographs as well as those of Marc Cohen, Don Eckert, Jerry Pritikin, Efren Ramirez, Rink, and Leland Toy. He was co-chair of the Harvey Milk City Hall Memorial Committee, and his photograph served as the basis for the bust of Milk that now resides in the rotunda of San Francisco's City Hall.

Nicoletta was one of the founders of the San Francisco International LGBT Film Festival, now known as the Frameline Film Festival. In 1977, while still working at Harvey Milk's photography shop, Nicoletta, along with David Waggoner, Marc Huestis, and others, began film screenings of their Super 8 films, called the Gay Film Festival of Super 8 Films, which evolved into the yearly festival.

From 1990 to 2000, Nicoletta maintained a photography studio in San Francisco's Hayes Valley neighborhood. The studio provided him a setting for work focused on artistic portraits of queer personalities, community leaders, performers and colorful urban characters. It also served as a cultural and social center where Nicoletta organized parties, salons, memorial services and other events.

Nicoletta's work has documented queer culture from the mid-1970s into the 2000s. In addition to his historic images of Harvey Milk, his subjects include the White Night riots, the Castro Street Fair, the San Francisco Pride Parade, The Cockettes, and the Angels of Light, as well as personalities such as Justin Bond, Loren Cameron, Divine, Mark Ewert, Ruth Weiss, Allen Ginsberg, Harry Hay, G.B. Jones, and Sylvester. He also has served as a set photographer for several films, including Vegas in Space (1992), Milk (2008) and All About Evil (2010).

=== Publications ===
Since the late 1970s, Nicoletta's photographs have been widely reproduced in periodicals, including The Advocate, the Bay Area Reporter, The Guardian, the Los Angeles Times, The New York Times, the San Francisco Chronicle, the Village Voice and X-tra West (Canada).

His work has appeared in numerous books, including Randy Shilts' The Mayor of Castro Street (1982); Ruth Silverman's San Francisco Observed: A Photographic Record (1986); Beth Schneider and Nancy E. Stoller's Women Resisting AIDS: Feminist Strategies of Empowerment (1995) (cover photo); Jim Van Buskirk and Susan Stryker's Gay by the Bay: A Pictorial History of Queer Culture in the San Francisco Bay Area (1996); David A. Sprigle's Beasts: FotoFactory Anthology II (1997); Strange de Jim's San Francisco's Castro (2003); David Gere's How to Make Dances in an Epidemic: Tracking Choreography in the Age of AIDS (2004); Joshua Gamson's The Fabulous Sylvester: The Legend, the Music, the Seventies in San Francisco (2006); Dustin Lance Black and Armistead Maupin's MILK: A Pictorial History of Harvey Milk (2009); and Chris March's I Heart Chris March (2010) (cover photo).

Harvey Milk "Forever Stamp," issued May 22, 2014. The stamp art centers on a photo of Milk taken in front of his camera store in San Francisco. The colors of the gay pride flag appear in a vertical strip in the top left corner.

Nicoletta's photographs have been featured in a number of documentary films. His images of Harvey Milk appear prominently in the 1985 Academy Award winning documentary The Times of Harvey Milk, directed by Rob Epstein. His work also appears in the 1993 Marc Huestis film Sex Is....

=== Exhibitions ===
The photographic work of Daniel Nicoletta has been shown in one-artist exhibitions at Josie's Cabaret (San Francisco, 1994); Levi-Strauss Corporate Headquarters (San Francisco, 1996); Overtones Gallery (Los Angeles, 2009); and Electric Works (San Francisco, 2010).

In addition, his prints have appeared in numerous group shows in the United States, including "AIDS: The Artists' Response," Hoyt L. Sherman Gallery, Ohio State University (April 1989); "Group Work: AIDS Timeline", Whitney Biennial (April 1991); "Harvey Milk: Second Sight," San Francisco Arts Commission Gallery (October–November 1998); "Out of the Closet," Catharine Clark Gallery, San Francisco (May–June 2000); "Made in California," Los Angeles County Museum of Art (October 2000–February 2001); "An Autobiography of the San Francisco Bay Area, Part 1," San Francisco Camerawork (September–October 2009); and "Life and Death in Black and White: AIDS Direct Action in San Francisco, 1985–1990," the GLBT History Museum, San Francisco (March–June 2012).

His work was featured in the 1997 exhibition "Goodbye to Berlin: 100 Jahre Schwulenbewegung," organized by the Schwules Museum at the Akademie der Künste in Berlin.

=== Museum and archival collections ===
Nicoletta's work is represented in the permanent collections of the James C. Hormel Gay and Lesbian Center at the San Francisco Public Library; the Bancroft Library at the University of California, Berkeley; the Wallach Collection of Fine Prints and the Berg Collection at the New York Public Library; the Schwules Museum in Berlin, Germany; and the GLBT Historical Society in San Francisco.

== In media ==
In the feature film Milk, a biographical film based on the life of Harvey Milk directed by Gus Van Sant, Daniel Nicoletta is played by Lucas Grabeel. Nicoletta plays Carl Carlson and served as the still photographer on the film.

== Bibliography ==
- LGBT San Francisco: The Daniel Nicoletta Photographs, (Reel Art Press, 2017) ISBN 978-1-909526-39-6
- Flight of Angels, Adrian Brooks (author) and Daniel Nicoletta (photographer) (Arsenal Pulp Press, 2008) ISBN 1-55152-231-4
- Gay by the Bay, Susan Stryker and Jim Van Buskirk, (Chronicle Books, 1996) ISBN 0-8118-1187-5
- The Mayor of Castro Street, Randy Shilts, (St. Martin's Press, 1988) ISBN 0-312-01900-9

== Film ==
- Reel in the Closet (2015) directed by Stu Maddux
- Milk (2008) directed by Gus Van Sant
- That Man: Peter Berlin (2005) directed by Jim Tushinski
- Sex Is (1993) directed by Marc Huestis
- The Times of Harvey Milk (1984) directed by Rob Epstein
- Theatrical Collage (1976) directed by Daniel Nicoletta
- The Advocate for Fagdom documentary by Angélique Bosio about queercore filmmaker Bruce La Bruce,
