= Isaac R. Fellman =

American archivist

- Born: Syracuse, New York, U.S.
- Education: Scripps College, University of Oregon
- Occupations: Writer, archivist
- Writing career
- Genres: Science fiction and fantasy
- Notable works: The Breath of the Sun (2018); Notes From a Regicide (2025)
- Notable awards: Lambda Literary Award for Science Fiction, Fantasy and Horror (2019)
- Website: isaacfellman.com

Isaac R. Fellman is an American archivist and science fiction and fantasy writer. His debut novel, The Breath of the Sun, earned him the 2019 Lambda Literary Award for Science Fiction, Fantasy and Horror. Since 2019, he has been a reference archivist at San Francisco's GLBT Historical Society, a museum of local and national LGBTQ history.

== Biography ==
Fellman was born in Syracuse, New York, and then lived in Pennsylvania shortly before he moved to California at 14 years old. He and his father are Jewish, and his mother is Catholic. The household in which Fellman was raised was "casually religious", and he has said that he does not believe in God.

He graduated with an English degree from Scripps College in Claremont, California, and began a doctorate at the University of Oregon (UO), but left the university with a master's degree. At UO, he conducted archival research on the correspondences between Joanna Russ and James Tiptree Jr., both science fiction authors, and later worked at the archives of the Charles M. Schulz Museum and Research Center and the California Historical Society, among other institutions. In his role at the Charles M. Schulz Museum, he appeared on panels at San Diego Comic-Con. In 2019, he was hired as an archivist at the San Francisco's GLBT Historical Society, a museum whose collections detail local and national LGBTQ history. One of his projects there focused on photographer Crawford Barton, who documented local gay culture from the 1960s through the 1980s.

Fellman has said that he previously identified as a woman who was "nominally" queer. He later came out as a transgender man. Prior to his gender transition, he worked as a paralegal, proofreader, and a secretary for a car dealer.

== Writing ==
Fellman's debut novel The Breath of the Sun earned him the 2019 Lambda Literary Award for Science Fiction, Fantasy and Horror and it was nominated for the Crawford Award, for debut fantasy novels, from the International Association for the Fantastic in the Arts. In a review in Strange Horizons magazine, Abigail Nussbaum wrote that it was difficult to find a description of the novel that does justice, noting the breadth of topics—"history, science, religion, propaganda, empire"—covered in such a short text. Fellman first published the novel under his deadname.

Dead Collections (2022) was written in five months at the beginning of the COVID-19 pandemic with the intent "to care for myself and also to care for other people who might identify with the same story." The novel's archivist protagonist, Sol, is Jewish and a trans man, like Fellman. Sol is stuck in limbo state, where he does not feel or appear as masculine as he would like, but is prevented from doing so due to his vampirism. He eventually finds love in the widow of a science fiction writer. Writer Casey McQuiston, in the New York Times, wrote that Dead Collections is a "thoughtful, acerbic, bracingly hopeful book". The novel was an honoree in the literature category of the 2022 Stonewall Book Awards.

In a starred review of Fellman's 2022 novella The Two Doctors Górski, Publishers Weekly praised the "brilliant, haunting tale" in which the author "seamlessly weaves inventive magic into a recognizable world of brutally competitive academia." Strange Horizons reviewer Amy Nagopaleen found "schisms of the self" to be the focus of the work, while academic careerism, gender, identity, neurodiversity, and trauma are also important themes.

Fellman published Notes From a Regicide in 2025. The novel was shortlisted for the 2026 Ursula K. Le Guin Prize.

== Bibliography ==
- Fellman, Isaac R. (2018). The Breath of the Sun. Aqueduct Press. ISBN 978-1-61976-138-4.
- — (2022). Dead Collections. Penguin Books. ISBN 9780143136910.
- — (2022). The Two Doctors Górski. Tordotcom. ISBN 978-1-250-84093-6.
- — (2025). Notes From a Regicide. Tor Books. ISBN 9781250329103.
