= Out On Screen =

LGBTQ film festival in Vancouver, Canada

Out On Screen (formally the Vancouver Out On Screen Film & Video Society) is an LGBTQ-oriented arts organization based in Vancouver, British Columbia, Canada. It began as a small, community-based film festival in 1988 and was registered as a BC society in 1989, in anticipation of the 1990 Gay Games. Since then, Out On Screen has evolved to become a professional arts organization with two key program initiatives: the Vancouver Queer Film Festival, the annual queer film festival in Vancouver, and Out In Schools, a province-wide educational program aimed primarily at high school students, but with program delivery across the education system, that employs film and video to address homophobia, transphobia, and bullying.

== Vancouver Queer Film Festival ==
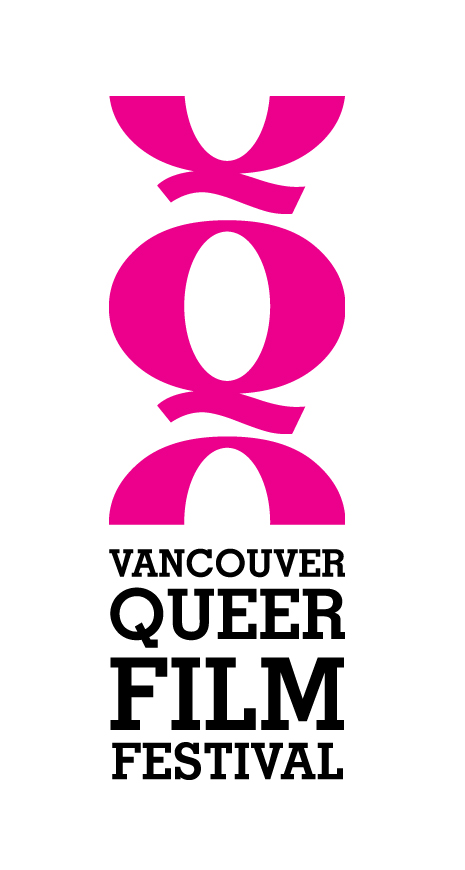
The Vancouver Queer Film Festival logo

The Vancouver Queer Film Festival is a film festival that takes place annually during the month of August. The festival was first held publicly in 1988. It is Vancouver's second largest film festival and Western Canada's largest queer arts event.

=== Festival awards ===
==== People's Choice Award for Best Feature ====
Year	Film	Director
2006	Unveiled	Angelina Maccarone
2007	Shelter	Jonah Markowitz
2008	Were the World Mine	Tom Gustafson
2009	I Can't Think Straight	Shamim Sarif
2010	Undertow	Javier Fuentes-Leon
2011	Gen Silent	Stu Maddux
2012	Mia	Javier Van de Couter
2013	Lace Bite	Carmen Klotz and Sharron Bates
2014	Tru Love	Kate Johnston and Shauna MacDonald
2015	A Girl at My Door (Dohee-Ya)	July Jung
2016	It Runs in the Family	Joella Cabalu
2017	Maybe Tomorrow (Baka Bukas)	Samantha Lee
2018	Saturday Church	Damon Cardasis
2019	The T	Bea Cordelia and Daniel Kyri
2020	Breaking Fast	Mike Mosallam

==== Gerry Brunet Memorial Award ====
Established in 1997, this juried award is given in recognition of Gerry Brunet, a lifelong contributor to the arts and an early board member at Out On Screen.

Year	Film	Director
2006	What Don't You Understand About "I'm Leaving Again"	Amey Kazymerchyk
2007	Trans Neptune	Matthew Long
2008	Writing the Land	Kevin Lee Burton
2008	Hirsute	AJ Bond
2009	Naoko-San	Rka Moorhouse
2010	Waiting 4 Goliath	Cal Garingan
2011	Mood for Love	Jason Karman
2012	Insert Credit	David Nguyen
2013	Bill, Please	Jessica Han
2014	Under the Rainbow	Dave Shortt
2015	Dissonance	Anna Ngo
2016	Meet Cute	Patrick Currie
2017	Violet and June	Linnea Ritland
2018	Colors	Yuki Chen
2019	Yellow Peril: Queer Destiny	Love Intersections
2020	B-Side	Alayna Silverberg

==== People's Choice Awards for Best Short ====
Originally named for OUTtv's Hot Pink Shorts TV show (The OUTtv Hot Pink Shorts Award), this award recognizes an exceptional short film.

Year	Film	Director
2009	The Portside	Aerlyn Weissman
2010	Butch Tits	Jen Crothers
2011	(3-way tie) B.A.B.S / Finding Judy / Quirk-E: A Learning Collective	Mette Bach / Gary Riotta / Callista Haggis
2012	Jackie	Jose Ignacio Correa
2013	Bill, Please	Jessica Han
2014	All Good Things	Ian Tang
2015	Same Boat	David C. Jones
2016	Handsome and Majestic	Jeff Lee Petry and Nathan Drillot
2017	Do I Have Boobs Now?	Joella Cabalu and Milena Salazar
2018	Beauty	Christina Willings
2019	She's Not a Boy	Yuhong Pang and Robert Tokanel
2020	HIV: Healing Inner Voices	martin Morberg and Jada-Gabrielle Pape

== Other programs ==
=== Out in Schools ===
Launched in 2004, Out in Schools brings independent queer films into local high schools in British Columbia. In conjunction with gay–straight alliances, Out in Schools focuses on the serious issues that affect queer youth. The purpose of Out in Schools is to reduce isolation and increase the safety of the learning environment for queer students in the community. Out in Schools aims to increase understanding through education to combat issues such as homophobia and bullying that threaten the safety of the classrooms for both queer and straight students. In 2013, Out in Schools expanded its program reach by 25% into new school districts, delivering 100 classroom presentations focused on queer and anti-bullying education to more than 8,200 high school students across BC.

=== FirstOUT Video Scholarship Program ===
FirstOUT Video Scholarship Program is an intensive digital filmmaking program for youth aged 16 to 24. This is part of the youth education initiatives which, together with Out In Schools, seeks to give media literacy and production opportunities to queer youth and their allies. It brings independent media artists together with queer youth to work with them on developing their own cultural voice and producing their first video. Since its inception, five films have been produced and exhibited.

==== 2007 ====
Out On Screen had partnered with Pacific Cinematheque to present the first year of the "FirstOUT Video Scholarship Program". The application submission ended in November 2006. By mid-December, four participants were selected and were paired in a one-on-one mentorship with celebrated local independent media artists in Vancouver, British Columbia. The training and production period began in February and ended late June. All of the four short films were screened at the 19th Annual Vancouver Queer Film Festival on August 18, 2007, at Pacific Cinematheque as part of the Youth Series. A youth-friendly reception followed to celebrate the accomplishment of the four young filmmakers, as well as the success of the program.

Film	Director	Mentor
The Nuwest Steambath	Julian DeMayo	Kenneth Sherman
Going In	Jacks Cheng	Terra Poirier
Borderless Me	Setareh Mohammadi	Karen Duthie
Checkpoint	Alex Mah	Winston Xin

^1 In addition to the four mentors above, Gabe Forsythe and Krista Stusiak were the youth mentors from Pacific Cinematheque's Education department who facilitated boot camp workshops on cinematography and technicality of filmmaking.

== See also ==
- List of LGBT film festivals
- List of film festivals in Canada
