= Fenway Health =

Health care organization based in Boston, Massachusetts

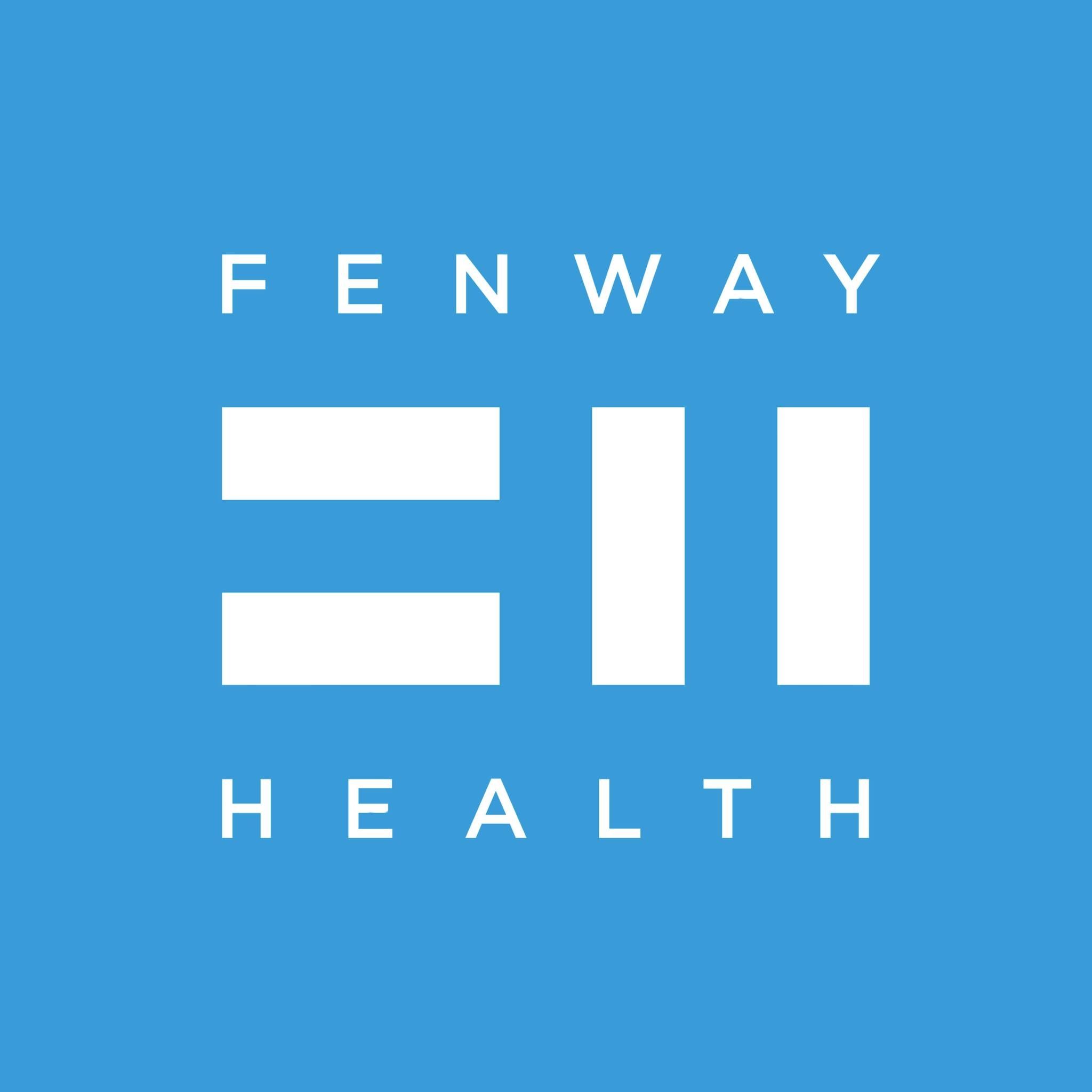

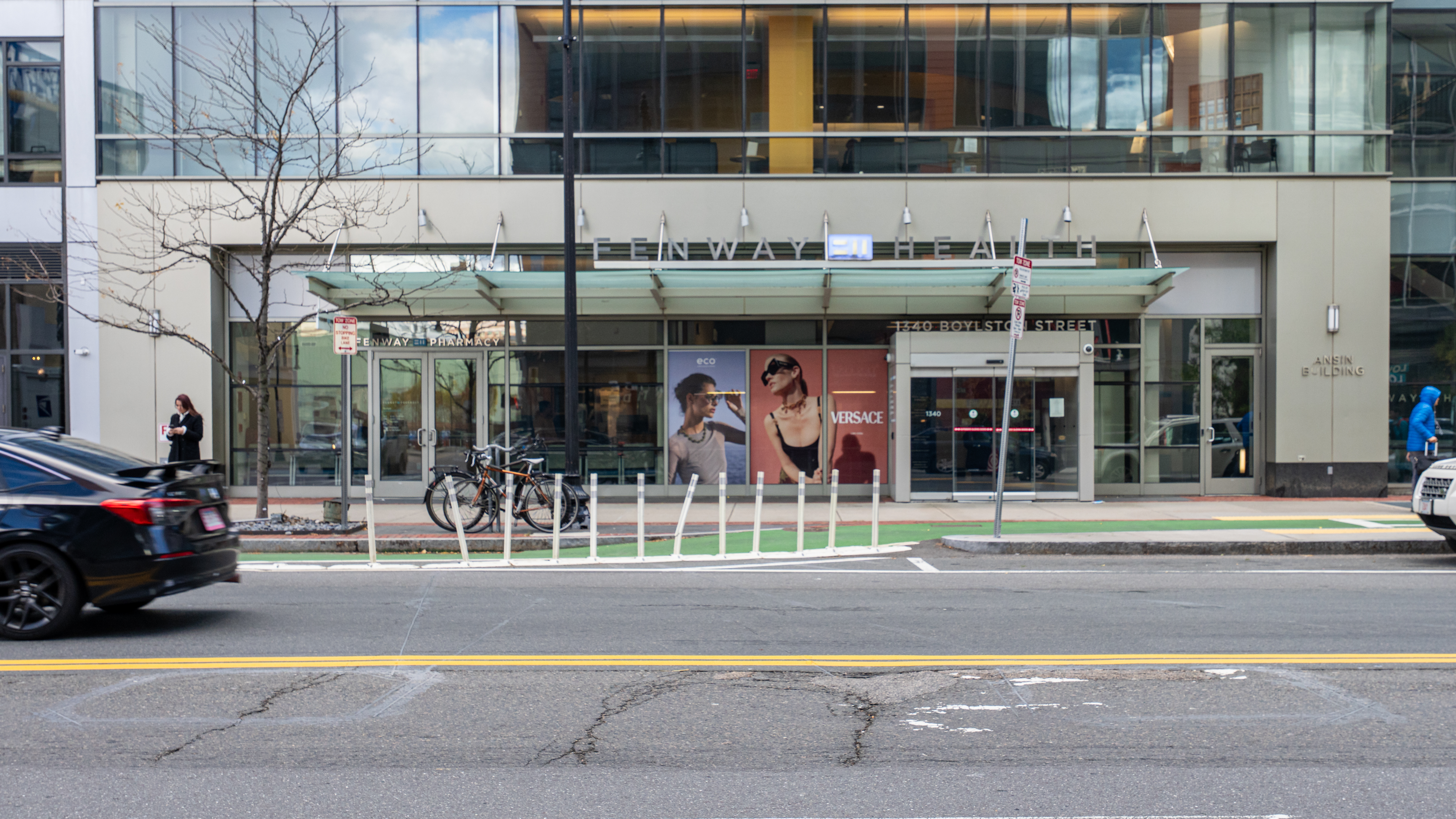
- Headquarters at 1340 Boylston Street
- Founded: 1971
- Founder: Northeastern University students
- Type: Non-profit organization
- Location: Boston, Massachusetts, United States
- Region served: Boston, Massachusetts, United States & national
- Services: Health care, research and advocacy
- Key people: Ellen LaPointe (CEO)
- Revenue: $38,287,280 (2010)
- Employees: 600+
- Website: FenwayHealth.org
- Formerly called: Fenway Community Health Center, Inc.

Fenway Health (formally Fenway Community Health Center, Inc.) is a non-for-profit community health center headquartered in Boston, Massachusetts. Fenway Health was founded in 1971 by two Northeastern University students with a focus on providing LGBTQ health care, research, and advocacy.

== History ==
In 1971, Northeastern University students David Scondras and Linda Beane opened a drop-in center in the basement of a senior center operated by The First Church of Christ, Scientist. They named the center the Fenway Community Health Center and staffed it with volunteer nursing students. By 1973, demand had grown to the point where Fenway incorporated as a freestanding health center and sought a larger space at 16 Haviland Street. Today, this space serves as Fenway: Sixteen, the home of Fenway's HIV Counseling, Testing & Referrals Program, Health Navigation Services, Helplines, and gay and bisexual men's health programs. The 16 Haviland Street location has since been closed as Fenway continues its attempts at reaching a broader audience than its traditional LGBT+ clients. In 1978, the center became fully licensed by the Massachusetts Department of Public Health.

Fenway became involved in treating HIV/AIDS patients in the early 1980s. In 1981, Fenway made the first diagnosis of AIDS in New England. Fenway's involvement with advocacy and HIV/AIDS research led to its 1994 selection by the National Institute of Allergies and Infectious Diseases as one of eight sites recruiting participants for the first clinical trials of an HIV vaccine.

Fenway's Alternative Insemination program, one of the first in the nation to offer AI services to lesbians, saw its first baby born in 1985.

Fenway held its first annual Dinner Party in 1992, a fundraiser for Fenway Women's Health that will become one of the largest LGBTQIA+ events in the nation.

In 1999, Fenway held the first annual Audre Lorde Cancer Awareness Brunch, a celebration of women of color and their supporters whose lives have been affected by cancer.

In 2001, Fenway launched The Fenway Institute, a national interdisciplinary center dedicated to ensuring cultural competence in health care for the LGBT community through research and evaluation, training and education, and policy and advocacy.

Fenway launched the Transgender Health Program in 2004 to help provide health care to this often underserved population. Seeing over 4,400 patients today, the program continues to expand to comprehensively address the needs of our transgender and gender non-conforming community.

In 2007, the American College of Physicians published The Fenway Guide to LGBT Health, edited by Dr. Harvey Makadon, Dr. Kenneth Mayer and Hilary Goldhammer of the Fenway Institute at Fenway Health, and Dr. Jennifer Potter of Beth Israel Deaconess Medical Center. "We realized this was an important area that wasn't being covered," Dr. Steven Weinberger, senior vice president for medical education and publishing of the American College of Physicians, said in an interview at the time. "It has not been taught in medical school...it sort of falls through the cracks in terms of the standard curriculum."

Fenway's current Ansin Building home at 1340 Boylston Street in Boston opened its doors in 2009. At ten stories and 100,000 square feet (9,300 m^{2}), it is the largest LGBT health and research facility in the United States.

In 2013, Fenway Health added two organizations to the Fenway family: the LGBT Aging Project and the AIDS Action Committee.

In 2015, Fenway's National LGBT Health Education Center held a first-of-its-kind medical conference focused on transgender health.

In December 2017, Fenway's CEO, Steven Boswell, resigned due to his handling of complaints about Dr. Harvey Makadon who allegedly sexually harassed and bullied staff members of the health clinic. Boswell reportedly ignored a recommendation by an independent law firm to fire the doctor with numerous complaints of harassment. The center's board appointed M. Jane Powers, Fenway's director of behavioral health, as interim CEO.

In 2017, Jennifer Potter, MD, was named co-chair of The Fenway Institute, alongside Kenneth Mayer, MD.

In December 2019, Ellen LaPointe was named chief executive officer of Fenway Health. During the COVID-19 pandemic, Fenway moved much of its medical and behavioral health care to telehealth. It operated COVID-19 testing sites in Boston and Everett. In September 2020, Fenway joined the NIH-backed COVID-19 Prevention Network as a site for the Phase 3 efficacy trial of the Oxford–AstraZeneca COVID-19 vaccine.

== Operations ==
Services at Fenway Health include medical and mental health, dental, eye care and pharmacy. Fenway also offers HIV prevention and health navigation services, and a Violence Recovery Program.

Fenway is also home to the National LGBTQIA+ Health Education Center. The Center provides educational programs, resources, and consultation to health care organizations with the goal of optimizing quality, cost-effective health care for lesbian, gay, bisexual, transgender, queer, intersex, asexual, and all sexual and gender minority (LGBTQIA+) people.

The Education Center is a part of The Fenway Institute, the internationally renowned research, training, and health policy division of Fenway Health.

Fenway Health's records are located in the Northeastern University Libraries, Archives and Special Collections Department, Boston, Massachusetts.

== Additional Sources ==
- Thomas Mortarelli, For People, Not For Profit: A History of Fenway Health's First Forty Years (AuthorHouse, 2012), ISBN 978-1477217016
