= Noel Tovey =

Indigenous Australian dancer (1934–2025)

Noel Tovey AM
- Born: 25 December 1934; Melbourne, Victoria, Australia
- Died: 11 August 2025 (aged 90)
- Occupations: Dancer; actor; choreographer; director

Noel Christian Tovey AM (25 December 1934 – 11 August 2025) was an Australian dancer, actor, and choreographer.

== Early life ==
Tovey was born in Melbourne in 1934 with Ngarrindjeri heritage through his mother and African and Creole French heritage through his father. In 2015 he told the Melbourne Age "I'm often called a member of the Stolen Generation, but I like to call it the Survival Generation." Tovey and his siblings lived in poverty and spent some time in foster care where they were subjected to physical and sexual abuse. Tovey lived with his mother in both Carlton and North Melbourne. His mother revealed his last name was 'Tovey' - rather than the surname he had been prosecuted under - when he applied to join the air force; he also used a family connection to Bluey Truscott.

== Dance and theatre career ==
Despite this hardship he went on to become successful in the theatre in both Australia and Great Britain, including appearing in the world premiere of Oh! Calcutta!. He taught at the Bristol Old Vic Theatre School and the Royal Academy of Dramatic Art in London and co-founded the London Theatre for Children before returning to Australia in 1990.

He played the lead role in Skipping on Stars based on the life of Indigenous tightwire walker Con Colleano, performed to celebrate the 25th anniversary of the Flying Fruit Fly Circus.

He was the artistic director for the Indigenous welcoming ceremony at the Sydney 2000 Olympics.

== LGBTQ+ advocacy ==
Tovey was openly gay and spoke out for the rights of LGBT elders. In 1951, he was imprisoned in Pentridge prison for homosexual acts.

== Awards and honours ==
In June 2010 Tovey was recognised for his contribution to the LGBTQ community with the {also} Foundation's Lifetime Achievement Award. In 2015, he was made a member of the Order of Australia inducted into the Victorian Aboriginal Honour Roll.

== Personal life and death ==
Tovey married Barbara Hickling and in 1961 they had a daughter, Felicity, who died in 2005. While living in London, he met his partner David Sarel, who died from an AIDS-related illness in 1986.

In 2004, Hodder Headline Australia published his autobiography Little Black Bastard

Tovey died on 11 August 2025, at the age of 90.
