= LGBT Aging Project =

LGBT equality non-profit organization

- Founded: 2001
- Location: Boston, Massachusetts
- Region served: New England
- Key people: Lisa Krinsky, Director; Bob Linscott, Assistant Director
- Website: LGBT Aging Project

The LGBT Aging Project is a Boston-based non-profit organization dedicated to ensuring that lesbian, gay, bisexual, and transgender older adults have equal access to life-prolonging benefits, protection, services and institutions as heterosexual and cisgender adults. Founded in 2001, the project provides cultural competence and institutional capacity training to elder service providers on how to create and sustain LGBT welcoming environments, develop community-building programs for LGBT older adults and caregivers, and also works to enact policy and legislative changes to improve access to care and benefits for LGBT elders. . The LGBT Aging Project was featured in the 2010 award-winning documentary Gen Silent.

== History ==
The LGBT Aging Project was founded in 2001 by a group of advocates from the aging service network and individuals from the LGBT community. The Greater Boston LGBT Aging Summit was held in June 2001 in order to create an action plan for the needs of LGBT elders. In the fall of 2001, the action plan created at the summit was released at a Massachusetts state house press conference.

In 2002, the LGBT Aging Project began organizing work groups on aging and health policy, training and programs development, housing and the creation of new programs within the project. The project also hired their first full-time director, Amy Hunt, and received a funding grant from the Boston Foundation. It was also in 2002 that the project defined their mission as "ensuring that lesbian, gay, bisexual, and transgender older adults and their caregivers have equal access to the life-prolonging benefits, protections, services and institutions that their heterosexual neighbors take for granted."

The year 2003 proved to be a major time of legislative change and policy action and advocacy for the LGBT Aging Project. The LGBT Aging Project was involved with marriage equality advocacy – through testimonies at the Massachusetts State House by both LGBT Aging Project members as well as LGBT older adults. Also in 2003, the LGBT Aging Project became more visible in the community through numerous presentations & events, such as the first Boston Pride Tea Dance for LGBT elders and their friends. The first LGBT caregiver support group also started in 2003 after the LGBT Aging Project was awarded an initial grant from the Caregiver Alliance of Suffolk County.

On May 17, 2004, marriage equality became a reality for the state of Massachusetts, partly due to the role that the LGBT Aging Project played in legislative advocacy for the cause. The LGBT Aging Project lost Amy Hunt as its director during 2004, and gained its current executive director, Lisa Krinsky. The LGBT Aging Project also made great strides in its development as it created a pilot program for the Open Door Task Force LGBT cultural competency training program, initiated trainings with major Area Agencies on Aging and Aging Service Access Points in Massachusetts, and opened Café Emmanuel with Ethos, a Boston area Aging Service Access Point. Café Emmanuel is Massachusetts’ first federally funded meal program for LGBT older adults and their friends.

Since 2005, the LGBT Aging Project has hosted numerous community forums for LGBT elders and held many state funded LGBT training and outreach sessions within the state Elder Service Network. In 2006, Bob Linscott, the current assistant director, was hired as a part-time outreach worker and site coordinator for Café Emmanuel. The year 2007 saw Bob rise to the full-time assistant director, and the LGBT Aging Project sponsored a number of events, including the Pride week event, LGBT Veterans Share their Stories and Stu Maddux’s film, “Bob and Jack’s 52 Year Adventure” at the Boston LGBT Film Festival. The LGBT Aging Project also launched a second LGBT friendly meal program with Ethos, “Out to Brunch,” for lesbian, bisexual and transgender women.

In 2008, a major stride was made in the Massachusetts state legislation with the passage of the MassHealth Equality Law, largely due to the work done by the LGBT Aging Project. This law ensures that same sex couples who are legally married in Massachusetts have equal access to eligibility evaluation when applying for the state's Medicaid program.

Since 2010, the LGBT Aging Project has secured funding to create LGBT bereavement support groups and healthy aging programs. The LGBT Aging Project also co-sponsored the Gen Silent premiere at the Boston LGBT Film Festival in 2010, in which it was featured along with six LGBT seniors in the Boston area.

2010 also saw the LGBT Aging Project become an inaugural training partner for the National Resource Center on LGBT Aging, the first federally funded resource on LGBT Aging, which is sponsored by the Administration on Aging.

== Funding ==
The LGBT Aging Project receives funding through a variety of sources including state grants, foundations and individuals.

== Programs ==
The LGBT Aging Project offers several direct services – an LGBT caregiver support group, LGBT bereavement support groups, and Healthy Aging in the LGBT Community programs, which include topics such as nutrition and memory fitness. Also, the LGBT Aging Project provides Open Door Task Force training and development, in which it assists mainstream elder service providers in evaluating organizational and program policies, offering practice skills training for direct service workers, and developing and delivering LGBT-welcoming programs and services. The LGBT Aging Project also makes civic leadership a priority by working to effectively sustain change in legislative policies that create equity for LGBT older adults and caregivers, as well as through gaining information and research that demonstrates the needs of LGBT people as they age.

== Events ==
In addition to the regular programs offered, the LGBT Aging Project also holds numerous special events and conferences to help bring about awareness of issues facing LGBT older adults and caregivers.

== Awards and recognition ==
Lisa Krinsky and Bob Linscott have been recognized on numerous occasions for their work with the LGBT Aging Project. In 2008, Linscott was recognized as the Person of the Year in the LGBT community by the Bay Windows Newspaper. Both Krinsky and Linscott were recognized by Boston Spirit Magazine in 2009 as People To Know. The project itself received the Somerville Cambridge Elder Services LGBT Award in 2009 and was featured on the front page of the October 9, 2007 New York Times with an article highlighting the struggle of LGBT elders.

In 2011, Krinsky was a Robert Wood Johnson Community Health Leader finalist and in 2012 the LGBT Aging Project was named a Social Innovator in Healthy Aging by Root Cause's Social Innovation Forum.

== See also ==
- LGBT history
- LGBT rights in the United States
- Gen Silent
- LGBT ageing
