= Reel in the Closet =

- Directed by: Stu Maddux
- Written by: Stu Maddux
- Produced by: Stu Maddux; Joseph Applebaum; John Raines
- Starring: Susan Stryker; Daniel Nicoletta; John Raines; Sharon Thompson; Barbara Gittings (archive footage); Frank Kameny (archive footage)
- Production company: Interrobang Productions
- Release date: June 21, 2015
- Running time: 82 minutes
- Country: United States
- Language: English

Reel in the Closet is a 2015 documentary film directed by Stu Maddux, featuring interviews with Daniel Nicoletta, Susan Stryker, and others.

== Synopsis ==
The film features LGBT home movies, videos, and other archival footage from the 1930s to 1980's, and stresses the importance of finding and restoring these films and videos.

== Film premiere ==
The film had its world premiere on 21 June 2015 at the Frameline Film Festival.
