= Transgender History (book) =

2008 book by Susan Stryker

- Cover for Transgender History, first edition
- Author: Susan Stryker
- Subject: history of transgender people in the United States
- Publisher: Seal Press
- Publication date: 2008
- Media type: Print (paperback)
- Pages: 208
- ISBN: 9781580052245
- OCLC: 183914566
- Dewey Decimal: 306.768
- LC Class: HQ77.9 .S77 2008

Transgender History is a non-fiction book by professor Susan Stryker that provides a concise history of transgender people in the United States from the middle of the 19th century to the 2000s. The book was published in 2008 by Seal Press, with a revised edition released in 2017.

== Content ==
The book is split up into five chapters, most of which deal with a particular period of history. Each chapter also features multiple "breakout sections" that define new terminology used in that chapter.

=== Introduction to transgender terms and concepts ===
This first chapter is an overview of the topic of gender identity and outlines Stryker's definition of common terms and concepts used throughout the work. This chapter also deals with the current arguments and discussions about transgender people. Multiple reviewers noted that Stryker's definition of transgender, as stated in the book as "people who move away from the gender they were assigned at birth, people who cross over (trans-) the boundaries constructed by their culture to define and contain their gender" forms a historical discussion that allows for a "history sensitive to a wide range of identities and experiences".

=== Transgender history ===
The second chapter discusses how the idea of transgender was pathologized from the 1850s through the 1950s by the medical community and how any type of gender nonconformity was treated as an illness. At the same time, the chapter discusses how the earliest forms of the transgender movement began and groups and organizations began to form. During this period, the ideas of sexuality and gender, homosexuality and transgender specifically, were not as clearly defined and often were assumed to be synonymous or at least closely related. Efforts to clearly differentiate gender into its own subject were seen through the actions of people like Magnus Hirschfeld and groups like the self described androgynes that made up the Cercle Hermaphroditos. These social and medical discussions helped to advance the visibility of transgender identity and to bring it into the public sphere. In later decades, groups and publications made by Virginia Prince would also raise the idea of cross-dressing and its relation to other gender subjects.

=== Transgender liberation ===
The third chapter chronicles grassroots organizing of transgender people, and how clashes with police and other regulators led to civil rights protests and riots in the United States, from the 1950s through the early 1970s. Among these events were the Stonewall riots, a demand for equal service at Dewey's Coffee Shop in Philadelphia, a small scale riot at Cooper's Donuts, and the Compton's Cafeteria riot in San Francisco. The riot at Compton's Cafeteria is the earliest documented large-scale riot by transgender people in the United States.

=== Difficult decades ===
The fourth chapter analyzes the backlash against the transgender movement, especially within the feminist and LGB movements through the 1970s and 1980s. This backlash came along with the push by transgender groups to have transgender identity listed under the medical diagnostic literature as a curable disorder called Gender Identity Disorder. The coalescence of the transgender community behind this resulted in the formation of several organizations composed solely of trans women, which began to achieve larger mainstream visibility during the period. At the same time, the chapter discusses the effects of the spread of AIDS among the transgender community, especially among persons of color.

=== Current wave ===
The fifth and final chapter examines the increasing visibility of transgender people from the 1990s through the present, improvements in medical technologies and health resources for transgender people, and acknowledgement of the complexities and subjectivity of gender.

== Critical reception ==
Clare Tebbutt reviewed Transgender History for Women's History Review, called the book an "important [addition] to US queer history", and praised the depth of Stryker's research. In a review for the Gay, Lesbian, Bisexual, and Transgender Round Table, a division of the American Library Association, Morgan Gwenwald called the book a "comprehensive overview of American transgender history from the mid-twentieth century to the present", that would be an "important addition to any gender studies, gay/lesbian studies or women's studies collection." Reese C. Kelly, writing for GLQ: A Journal of Lesbian and Gay Studies, described the book as an "engaging introduction to transgender history and activism" that is able to remain accessible to a wide public audience, even though its length of less than 200 pages ensures that it cannot be considered the "definitive text" on the subject. Kelly also approved of the extensive background and resources the book gives to its readers, namely a "theoretically informed analysis, a reader's guide to steer discussion and research, and a sizeable list of sources and additional resources".

In a review for the journal Archivaria, Carrie Schmidt said that the book was a "well-researched, highly detailed, yet inherently complicated recounting of the history of the transgender movement in the United States" and that it was "informative without being dry, provided that the reader has an interest in feminism, gender, sexuality, [and] social issues". Polare magazine's Tracie O'Keefe noted that while Transgender History is a "very digestible volume" that acts as a "pocket-sized read of American trans history for those who are not academics because it reads so easily", it is also "an academic reference because it is well referenced". O'Keefe also stated their disappointment that the history of transgender identities in Native American culture was not explored in the book. Transgender History was recommended highly by Choice magazine reviewer K. Gedge. Gedge added that the "sources, suggested readings, reader's guide, many short profiles of activists, publications, organizations, films, and Web sites" included in the book all encouraged readers to "research the topic more fully".

== See also ==
- A Queer History of the United States (2011)
- History of transgender people in the United States
- LGBT history
- List of transgender publications
- 2008 in literature
