= Mette Bach =

Danish-Canadian novelist and screenwriter

- Born: Denmark
- Education: University of British Columbia (B.A.); Simon Fraser University (MFA)
- Occupation: Author
- Writing career
- Language: English, Danish
- Genres: non-fiction, literary fiction, book reviews, screenplays
- Website: www.mettebach.com

Mette Bach is a Danish-Canadian author, teacher, screenwriter, and director. She was born in Denmark and grew up in North Delta. Bach attended Simon Fraser University where she received a Bachelor of Arts in English. She has an MFA from the University of British Columbia's Creative Writing Program.

== Bibliography ==
=== Books ===
Mette Bach's first book, Off the Highway: Growing Up in North Delta, was published in 2010 by New Star Books. Off the Highway is the nineteenth book in the "Transmontanus" series, edited by Terry Glavin. The book explores her childhood growing up with immigrant parents in the Lower Mainland of British Columbia.

Bach has also written several young adult novels for Lorimer's high/low series. Killer Drop (2017) and Femme (2015) are part of the SideStreets series of "edgy high/low fiction for teen reluctant readers." Love is Love (2018), Charming (2019), Cinders (2019), and You're You (2017) and 'The Love Code' (2021) are part of the Real Love series, "high/low YA novels that focus on realistic teen relationships."

=== Anthologies (contributor) ===
Bach's essays have appeared in the following anthologies: First Person Queer (published by Arsenal Pulp Press in 2007 and edited by Richard Labonté and Lawrence Schimel), Second Person Queer (2009), Fist of the Spider Woman: Tales of Fear & Queer Desire (published by Arsenal Pulp Press in 2009 and edited by Amber Dawn), and Visible: A Femmethology (Homofactus Press).

=== Essays ===
Bach's essays have appeared in several literary journals, including Prairie Fire, Plenitude ,Room, Journal of Creative Writing (SFU), and Harrington Lesbian Fiction Quarterly.

=== Journalism ===
Bach's journalism has appeared in Xtra West, Vancouver Review, Vancouver Magazine, Western Living, The Advocate, The Westender, Out Words, Memewar magazine, Canoeroots Magazine, Gay and Lesbian Times, FFWD. She has written book reviews published in The Globe and Mail, Vancouver Review, FFWD, and Just Out Weekly.

From 2004–2009 she wrote a regular column called "Not That Kind of Girl" for Outlooks Magazine (Canada's LGBTQ Magazine) and Out Look Weekly. It was syndicated in EXP Magazine, She, and Metroline. Selected articles have also been published in San Diego's Gay and Lesbian Times, Out in the Mountains, and Out Word.

=== Films ===
Bach's first screenplay, "Ms. Thing", was directed by Aren X. Tulchinsky in 2010. The film was screened at film festivals internationally.

"Ms. Thing" was First Runner Up at Out On Screen's Short Film Award (Vancouver Queer Film Festival), and won Audience Choice Award at QueerFruits Australia.

Daniella Sorrentino directed Bach's second screenplay, "Viral", which debuted August 20, 2011 at the Vancouver Queer Film Festival. "B.A.B.S." is Bach's first short film that she directed and debuted at Vancouver Queer Film Festival (August 20, 2011). "B.A.B.S." also won OutTV's Hot Pink Shorts Audience Choice Award in a three-way tie at the Vancouver Queer Film Festival 2011.
