= Susan Stryker =

American historian and author (born 1961)

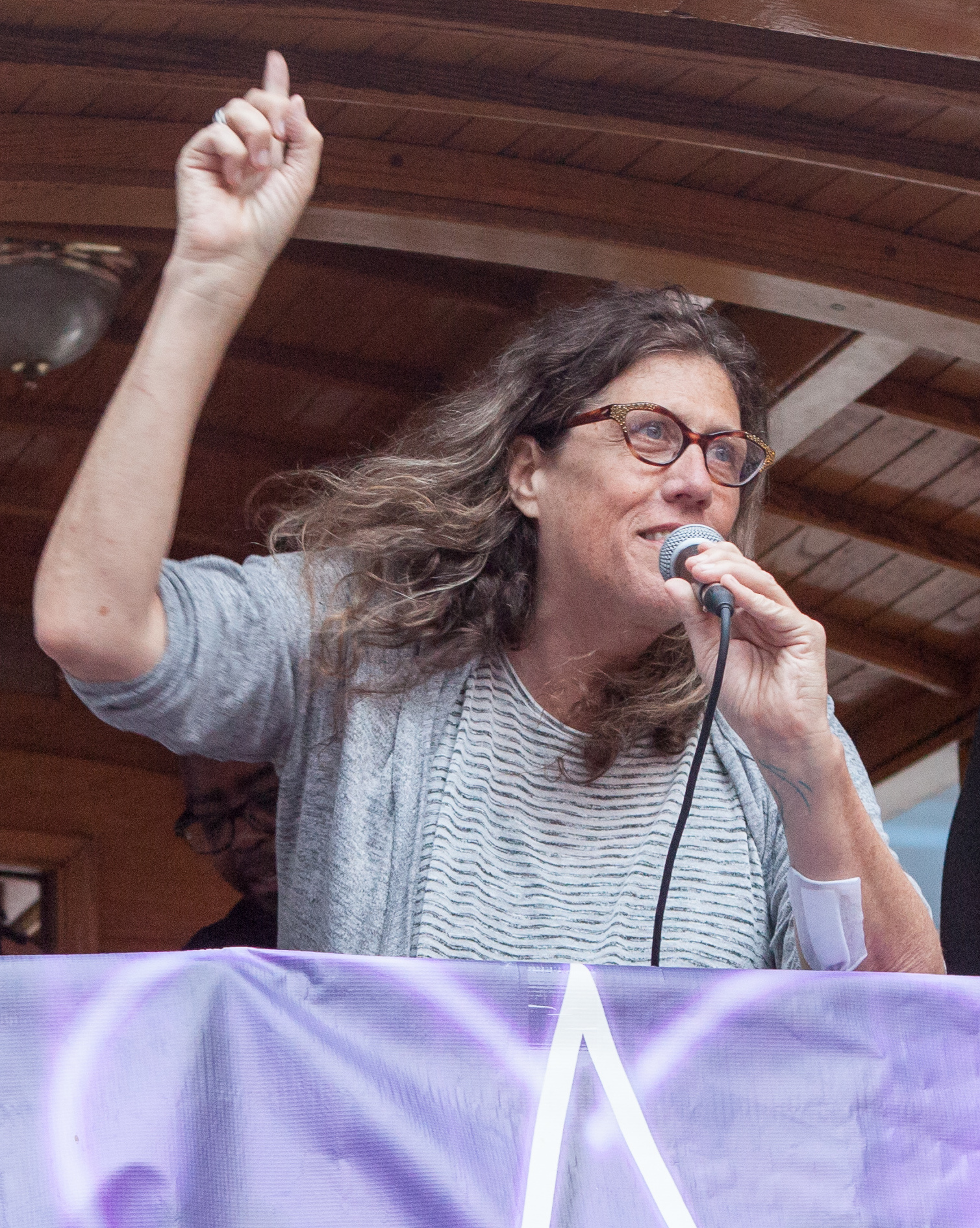
- At Trans March San Francisco, June 2017
- Born: 1961 (age 64–65)
- Education: University of Oklahoma (BA); University of California, Berkeley (PhD)
- Occupations: Professor; author; editor; filmmaker; historian
- Writing career
- Language: English
- Subjects: Gender studies LGBT culture LGBT rights in the United States; Women's studies
- Notable work: The Transgender Studies Reader (2006)
- Notable awards: Lambda Literary Award; San Francisco / Northern California Emmy Award
- Website: www.susanstryker.net/home

Susan Stryker (born 1961) is an American professor, historian, author, filmmaker, and theorist whose work focuses on gender and human sexuality. She is a professor of Gender and Women's Studies, former director of the Institute for LGBT Studies, and founder of the Transgender Studies Initiative at the University of Arizona. Stryker is the author of several books and a founding figure of transgender studies as well as a scholar of transgender history.

== Education ==
Stryker received a bachelor's degree in Letters from University of Oklahoma in 1983. She earned a Ph.D. in United States History at the University of California, Berkeley in 1992; the doctoral thesis she presented was Making Mormonism: A Critical and Historical Analysis of Cultural Formation.

== Career ==
Stryker is Professor Emerita of Gender and Women's Studies at the University of Arizona, and is the former director of the university's Institute for LGBT Studies. She has served as a visiting professor at Harvard University, University of California, Santa Cruz, and Simon Fraser University. She is an openly lesbian trans woman who has produced a significant body of work about transgender and queer culture.

She came out as transgender and began to transition shortly after earning her doctorate. Her scholarly article "My Words to Victor Frankenstein Above the Village of Chamounix", published in 1994, was her first published academic article, and one of the first articles published in a peer-reviewed academic journal by an openly transgender author. (In this she was preceded by sociologist Roberta Perkins.)

Stryker was later awarded a postdoctoral research fellowship in human sexuality studies at Stanford University, sponsored by the Social Science Research Council and the Ford Foundation. From 1999 to 2003, she was the executive director of the GLBT Historical Society in San Francisco.

In 2004, Stryker was distinguished visiting faculty in the Department of Critical and Cultural Studies at Macquarie University. In 2007–08 she held the Ruth Wynn Woodward Endowed Visiting Professorship in Women's Studies at Simon Fraser University in Vancouver, Canada. In fall 2008 she was distinguished visiting faculty with the Committee on Degrees in Women's, Gender and Sexuality Studies at Harvard University, and in Spring 2009 she was Regents' Distinguished Lecturer in Feminist Studies at University of California – Santa Cruz. She was hired with tenure as Associate Professor of Gender Studies at Indiana University in 2009, and left to accept a position as Associate Professor of Gender and Women's Studies and Director of the Institute for LGBT Studies at the University of Arizona in 2011.

In 2013, Stryker established the Transgender Studies Initiative at the University of Arizona. She focused on "hiring faculty of color", in her own words.

In 2015, Yale University awarded Stryker the James Robert Brudner Class of 1983 Memorial Prize for lifetime accomplishment and scholarly contributions in the field of lesbian and gay studies. In 2007, the Monette-Horowitz Trust honored her for her anti-homophobia activism. Among her other honors are a Community Vanguard Award from the Transgender Law Center, and recognition as a "Local Hero" by San Francisco public television station KQED.

In 2014, Stryker gave the keynote speech at the first Moving Trans History Forward conference, organized by the Chair in Transgender Studies, Aaron Devor, and held at the University of Victoria. She is currently on leave from the University of Arizona while holding an appointment as Barbara Lee Distinguished Chair in Women's Leadership at Mills College. Stryker serves on the Advisory Council of METI (Messaging Extraterrestrial Intelligence) and the Advisory Board of the Digital Transgender Archive.

== Publications ==
=== Books ===
Stryker's first book, Gay by the Bay: A History of Queer Culture in the San Francisco Bay Area (Chronicle Books 1996), coauthored with Jim Van Buskirk, is an illustrated account of the evolution of LGBT culture in the San Francisco Bay Area of Northern California. This book and its successor, Queer Pulp, were each nominated for a Lambda Literary Award.

In the critical survey Queer Pulp: Perverted Passions from the Golden Age of the Paperback (Chronicle Books 2001), Stryker turned her attention to the lesbian pulp fiction and gay male pulp fiction published in the United States from the 1930s through the 1960s.

With Stephen Whittle she co-edited The Transgender Studies Reader (Routledge 2006), which was her first work to win a Lambda Literary Award. Her following book, Transgender History (Seal Press 2008), covers transvestism, transgender people, and transsexualism in the United States from the conclusion of World War II to the 2000s. After this, she co-edited The Transgender Studies Reader 2 (2013, with Aren Aizura) and The Transgender Studies Reader Remix (2022, with Dylan McCarthy Blackston).

Stryker is now working on a new book project, Cross-Dressing for Empire: Gender and Performance at the Bohemian Grove. The Bohemian Grove is a campground in Northern California, and the summer meeting-place of the Bohemian Club, a private organization of American men with considerable political and economic power or cultural influence.

In 2024, the anthology When Monsters Speak. A Susan Stryker Reader was published with an introduction by McKenzie Wark.

In August 2026, Stryker released Changing Gender, a book examining views on gender, identity, and equality.

=== Film and video ===
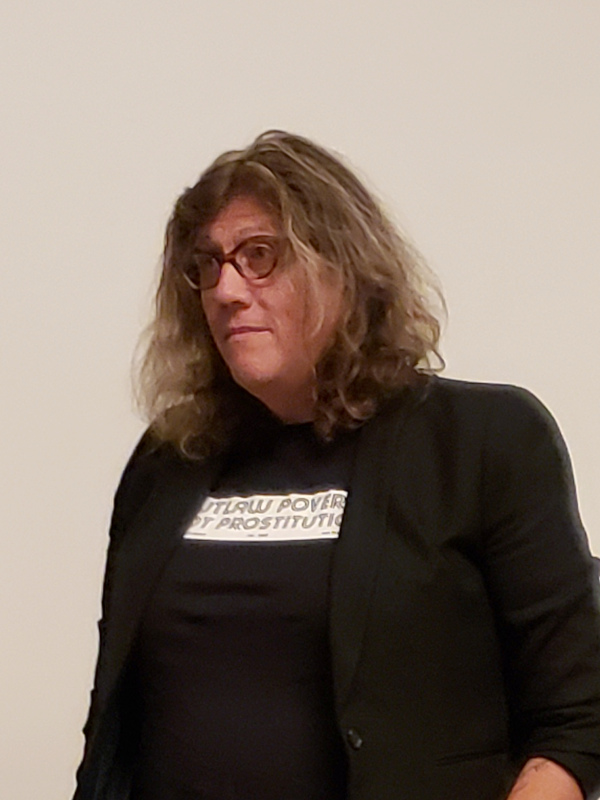
Stryker presenting Screaming Queens in 2019

Stryker received a San Francisco / Northern California Emmy Award for her directorial work on Screaming Queens: The Riot at Compton's Cafeteria (2005), a documentary film about the Gene Compton's Cafeteria riot of 1966; the film was co-written, -directed, and -produced by Victor Silverman. With director Michelle Lawler and executive producer Kim Klausner she subsequently co-produced Forever's Gonna Start Tonight (2009), a documentary film about Vicki Marlane, an HIV-positive, transgender performer at nightclubs and lounges. Stryker's most recent documentary is Christine in the Cutting Room (2013), an experimental film about Christine Jorgensen.

Monika Treut filmed and interviewed Stryker for the 1999 documentary film Gendernauts: A Journey Through Shifting Identities. She was also interviewed for a 2002 episode of the long-running television documentary series SexTV, and for two episodes of Sex: The Revolution (2008). She is featured in the documentary Diagnosing Difference (2009) and in the film Reel in the Closet (2015), directed by Stu Maddux.

In 2021, Stryker appeared and served as a consulting producer on The Lady and the Dale, an HBO documentary series revolving around Elizabeth Carmichael, the founder of Twentieth Century Motor Car Corporation. She also appeared as herself in Pride, a 6-part documentary series focusing on LGBT history decade-by-decade, for FX.

=== Articles, essays, and scholarly papers ===
Stryker and Paisley Currah co-edit TSQ: Transgender Studies Quarterly, the first non-medical academic journal devoted to transgender issues. The journal premiered in 2014.

Stryker's scholarly papers have been published in GLQ: A Journal of Lesbian and Gay Studies, WSQ: Women's Studies Quarterly, parallax, Radical History Review, and other academic journals. In 2008, she was nominated for a GLAAD Media Award for her Salon.com article "Why the T in LGBT is Here to Stay", a response to John Aravosis' 2007 article "How did the T get in LGBT?".

In one paper, "Transgender Studies: Queer Theory's Evil Twin" (2004), Stryker describes how transgender people are often marginalized within the queer community, and how the academic discipline of Queer Studies privileges specific narratives of sexual orientation over gender identity.

In her performance piece “Transgender Rage,” which would later be reformatted as an essay titled “My Words to Victor Frankenstein Above the Village of Chamounix: Performing Transgender Rage,” Susan Stryker coined the term “transgender rage” to describe the affective experience that results from existing in a body that transgresses patriarchal definitions of sex and gender.

== Bibliography ==
=== Books ===
- Gay by the Bay: A History of Queer Culture in the San Francisco Bay Area (1996), Chronicle, ISBN 978-0811811873
- Queer Pulp: Perverted Passions from the Golden Age of the Paperback (2001), Chronicle, ISBN 978-0811830201
- Transgender History (2008), Seal Press, ISBN 978-1580052245
- When Monsters Speak. A Susan Stryker Reader (edited by McKenzie Wark) (2024), Duke University Press, ISBN 978-1478030478
- Changing Gender (2026), Macmillan Publishers, ISBN 978-0374123505

=== Edited volumes ===
- The Transgender Studies Reader (2006), Routledge, ISBN 978-0415947091
- The Transgender Studies Reader 2 (2013), Routledge, ISBN 978-0415517720
- The Transgender Studies Reader Remix (2022), Routledge, ISBN 978-1032062471

== Filmography ==
The following films have involved Stryker, as either a director, producer, or interviewee:

- Gendernauts (1999)
- Screaming Queens: The Riot at Compton's Cafeteria (June 18, 2005)
- Forever's Gonna Start Tonight (2009)
- Christine in the Cutting Room (2013)
- Masculinity/Femininity (2014)
- Disclosure: Trans Lives on Screen (2020)
- No Ordinary Man (2020)
- Genderation (2021)
- The Lady and the Dale (2021)
- Pride (2021)

== See also ==
- Family and consumer science
- LGBT history in the United States
- List of LGBT writers
- List of University of California, Berkeley alumni
- List of University of Oklahoma people
- Timeline of LGBT history
- Transgender studies
