= Matthew Long (director) =

Canadian film director and screenwriter

Matthew Long (born July 7, 1982 in Prince George, British Columbia) is a Vancouver-based writer, director, and producer. His films include The Great Retro-Chic Revival (2005), Trans Neptune: or The Fall of Pandora, Drag Queen Cosmonaut (2007), and The Anachronism (2008). Long's films often contain elements of science fiction, although in The Anachronism these elements are placed against the backdrop of a period piece set in a pre-high-technology era, and is firmly in the steampunk genre.

In May 2005, The Great Retro-Chic Revival won Leo Awards in the categories of Best Student Production and Best Direction in a Student Film.

The world premiere for Trans-Neptune took place at the Cannes Film Festival in 2007. On August 26, 2007, Trans-Neptune won the Gerry Brunet Memorial Award at the 19th annual Vancouver Queer Film Festival

On May 4, 2009, The Anachronism won seven Leo Awards, including Best Short Drama, Best Screenwriting in a Short Drama, Best Overall Sound in a Short Drama, Best Musical Score in a Short Drama, Best Production Design in a Short Drama, and Best Costume Design in a Short Drama.
