= A Queer History of the United States =

2011 book by Michael Bronski

- Author: Michael Bronski
- Language: English
- Subject: LGBT history in the United States
- Published: May 10, 2011 (Beacon Press)
- Publication place: United States
- Media type: Print
- Pages: 287
- Awards: Israel Fishman Non-Fiction Award
- ISBN: 978-0-8070-4439-1
- OCLC: 662402765
- Dewey Decimal: 306.76/60973
- LC Class: HQ76.3.U5 B696 2011

A Queer History of the United States is a concise history of LGBTQ people in US society. It describes ways in which queer people have influenced the evolution of the United States, and how the culture of the United States has affected them.

A Queer History of the United States was published by Beacon Press in 2011. It was recognized with a Stonewall Book Award in 2012. The author, Michael Bronski, is a professor of Women's & Gender Studies at Dartmouth College, and professor of Practice in Media and Activism in Studies of Women, Gender, and Sexuality at Harvard University.

== Chapters ==
1. The Persecuting Society
2. Sexually Ambiguous Revolutions
3. Imagining a Queer America
4. A Democracy of Death and Art
5. A Dangerous Purity
6. Life on the Stage, Life in the City
7. Production and Marketing of Gender
8. Sex in the Trenches
9. Visible Communities, Invisible Lives
10. Revolt, Backlash, Resistance

== Young readers edition ==
In 2019, an adapted version of the book designed for young readers was released.

== Reception ==
The book received a starred review from Kirkus Reviews.

== See also ==
- Gay American History: Lesbians and Gay Men in the U.S.A. (1976)
- Transgender History (2008)
- Real Queer America (2019)
- LGBT history in the United States
- History of the United States
- 2011 in literature
