= Marc Huestis =

American filmmaker (born 1954)

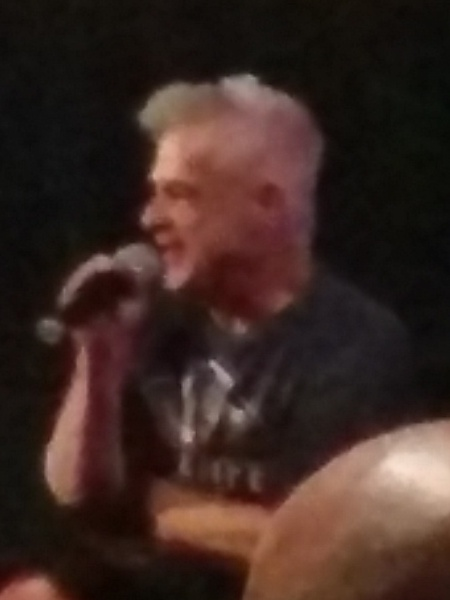
Marc Huestis in 2016

Marc Huestis (born December 26, 1954) is an American filmmaker, camp impresario and social activist. He is best known for his motion picture Sex Is... and his in-person tributes/benefit events feting celebrities from Hollywood's Golden Age and cult personas at San Francisco's Castro Theatre.

== Early life ==
Huestis was born in Long Island, New York. His mother was a dancer and his father was a video editor at NBC, where he cut the hit TV show Hullabaloo. He studied theater at Binghamton University from 1972 to 1974. Afterwards, Huestis took the famed Green Tortoise to San Francisco & there hooked up with the colorful theatre group the Angels of Light. His interest soon veered to film, taking classes at City College of San Francisco. While getting his super 8 films developed at Harvey Milk's Castro Camera store, he met a group of fellow fledgeling filmmakers. Together with Daniel Nicoletta, Ric Mears and others, Huestis founded the San Francisco Gay Film Festival, now the oldest and largest of its ilk. In 2001, in honor of the 25th Anniversary of the Festival, Huestis and the founding members were given the Frameline Film Festival Award.

== Filmography ==
Huestis' history as a filmmaker parallels that of the San Francisco International Lesbian & Gay Film Festival, now Frameline Film Festival. From the early days of gay film in the 1970s when his grainy super 8 films were projected on stained sheets, to the advent of new technologies, Huestis has been dedicated to being a unique voice in the filmmaking community. He has directed the following titles:

- Unity (1977), a memory piece dealing with the persecution of gays in Nazi Germany
- Whatever Happened To Susan Jane? (1982), a spoof of underground San Francisco, circa 1980; with Wendy Dallas
- Chuck Solomon: Coming Of Age (1986) a profile of a San Francisco theatre director, and his strength to deal with AIDS
- Men in Love (1990), a fictional film about a man who travels to a New Age center to cope with the death of his lover
- Sex Is... (1993), the highly popular video/ film exploring the meaning of sex and sexuality within the lives of gay men; with Lawrence Helman. Sex Is... premiered at the 1993 Berlin Film Festival, where it won a Teddy Award;
- Another Goddamn Benefit (1997), documenting 20 years of grassroots theatrical response to issues important to the gay/lesbian and HIV communities
- 25 - A Brief History Of The Festival (2001), celebrating 25 years of the Frameline Film Festival
- Way Cool (2004), focusing on the protests at the 2004 Republican National Convention
- Lulu Gets A Facelift (2007) , a feature documentary following performer Lulu, a "mid-life crisis in action" who decides to get a facelift
- Huestis also served as executive producer for the feature film The Toilers and the Wayfarers (1996)

== The Castro Theatre Extravaganzas ==
In 1994, along with producer Lawrence Helman, Huestis began to present celebrity tributes at San Francisco's majestic Castro Theatre. The first, The Poseidon Event-ure featuring star Carol Lynley, was a success, selling out the 1400 seat venue. Soon these events drew national attention, where in an article entitled "Celebration of Camp", Variety reporter Dennis Harvey commented " it took local entrepreneur Marc Huestis to perfect a meld of screen and live ultrakitsch."

In the past 15 years, Huestis has produced over 25 staged extravaganzas/tributes. Significant funds from these benefit events have been raised for needy AIDS/socially conscious organizations. Celebrities that have participated in, or been honored by, Huestis' galas (both at the Castro & elsewhere) have included Ann-Margret, Ann Blyth, Ann Miller, Armistead Maupin, Barbara Parkins, Bruce Vilanch, Carol Lynley, Christina Crawford, Connie Champagne, Debbie Reynolds, Edie Adams, Erik Lee Preminger, Hector Elizondo, Mimi Kennedy Jack Lemmon, Jackie Beat, Jan Wahl, Jane Russell, Janeane Garofalo, Jeffrey Sebelia, Joan Baez, JoBeth Williams, John Cameron Mitchell, John Schlesinger, John Waters, Justin Bond, Karen Black, Lady Bunny, Lana Wood, Linda Blair, Lypsinka, Margaret O'Brien, Mary Badham, Michael Musto, Michelle Shocked, Mike Farrell, Mitzi Gaynor, Natalie Wood, Olivia Hussey, Leonard Whiting, Patty Duke, Patty McCormack, Piper Laurie, Reno, Rex Reed, Sandra Dee, Santino Rice, Sissy Spacek, Stella Stevens, Sylvia Miles, Thelma Houston, Tony Curtis, Troy Donahue, Varla Jean Merman, and Rutanya Alda.

In a feature piece in the San Francisco Chronicle written by David Wiegand, tribute Carol Lynley compared the showman favorably to such impresarios as Otto Preminger, Irwin Allen and Mike Todd, and summed up her feelings about Huestis - " He's larger than life; he's larger than imagination." In 2008, Huestis was honored by the San Francisco Board of Supervisors for his life achievement and work in benefiting many San Francisco non-profits.
