= LGBTQ retirement issues in the United States =

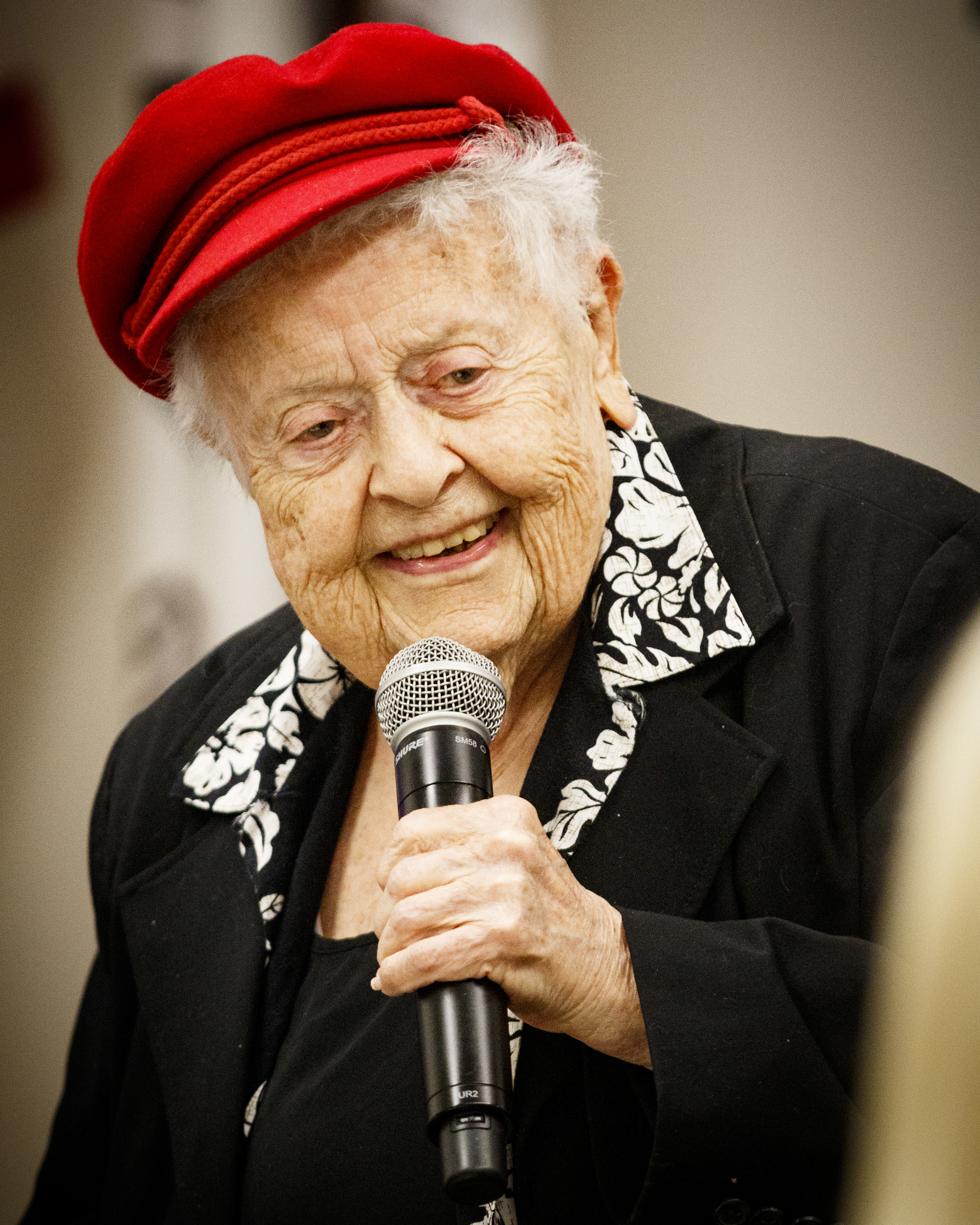
Ivy Bottini, LGBT retirement advocate, speaking at Stonewall Democratic Club on January 28, 2019

Many retirement issues for lesbian, gay, bisexual, transgender, queer (LGBTQ) and intersex people in the United States are unique from their non-LGBTI counterparts and these populations often have to take extra steps addressing their employment, health, legal and housing concerns to ensure their needs are met.

Throughout the country, "2 million people age 50 and older identify as LGBT, and that number is expected to double by 2030", estimated in a study done by the Institute for Multigenerational Health at the University of Washington.

In 1969, the Stonewall Riots marked the start of the modern gay rights movement and increasingly LGBTQ+ people have become more visible and accepted into mainstream cultures. LGBTQ+ elders and retirees are still considered a newer phenomenon creating challenges and opportunities as a range of aging issues are becoming more understood as those who live open lives redefine commonly held beliefs and as retirees newly come out of the closet.

LGBTQ+ individuals are less likely to have strong family support to have relatives to care for them during aging. They are twice as likely to enter old age living as a single person; and two and a half times more likely to live alone. Because institutionalized homophobia as well as cultural discrimination and harassment still exist, they are less likely to access health care, housing, or social services or when they do, find the experience stressful or demeaning.

Joel Ginsberg, executive director of the Gay Lesbian Medical Association, asserts "only by pursuing both strategies, encouraging institutional change and encouraging...and empowering individuals to ask for what they want will we end up with quality care for LGBT people."

LGBTQ+ Aging Centers have opened in several major metropolitan areas with the goal of training long-term care providers about LGBT-specific issues, an area of frequent discrimination. Legislative solutions are available as well: "California is the only state with a law saying the gay elderly have special needs, like other members of minority groups. A new law encourages training for employees and contractors who work with the elderly and permits state financing of projects like gay senior centers." Twenty states prohibit discrimination in housing and public accommodation on the basis of sexual orientation.

== Aging in the LGBT+ community ==
=== “Baby boomers” aging ===
Baby boomers are putting significant visibility on the elderly population of the United States, as well as significant stressors. The overall U.S. population age rises with the retirement of Baby Boomers. Currently, there are about three million LGBT seniors above 65, with that number jumping to over six million by 2030. According to a 2010 study of over a thousand LGBTQ+ 45- to 64-year-olds and a comparative group of the same number of baby boomers, drawn randomly from the general population, "all boomers have the same fears about aging, are struggling to finance their retirement, have similar caregiving patterns, and similar desires for end-of-life care. However, in some respects, LGBT boomers will approach retirement differently. They have withstood many years of discrimination and say their approach to retirement and aging has been shaped by their experiences. They express concerns about being dependent on others when they become infirm. Largely single and living alone, they will rely more on close friends than family for support as they age".

=== Familial issues ===
Homosexual senior citizens are cited as being four times less likely to have children or grandchildren, signaling less of a support system for later-life circumstances. According to the National Gay and Lesbian Task Force, homosexuals are also twice as likely to live alone. Many in such a community faced adulthood before the normalcy of same-sex partnerships and the legalization of same-sex marriage, and as such, never sought partnership status, benefits, or a long-term relationship in general.

=== HIV ===
As more people continue to live with HIV and AIDS into old age, there are new points brought to light in terms of complications, needs, and services. stigma, especially among older people living with HIV, often affects the quality of life lived. It also leads to greater isolation in old age. Stigma specifically can lessen quality of life and negatively affect self-image and behaviors, leading to the inability or lack of wanting to disclose HIV status or to seek care. There is also an increase in mental illness compared to the general aging population, often associated with the same reasonings along with a lack of specified care. Therefore, it is very integral that HIV care is provided in terms of mental health and other services to the affected elderly population at large. Administering necessary medications and coverage for such medications and cocktails is a concern and a necessity for the elderly community living with HIV/AIDs, to which there is a disproportionate number of LGBTQ+ persons.

== Modern history ==
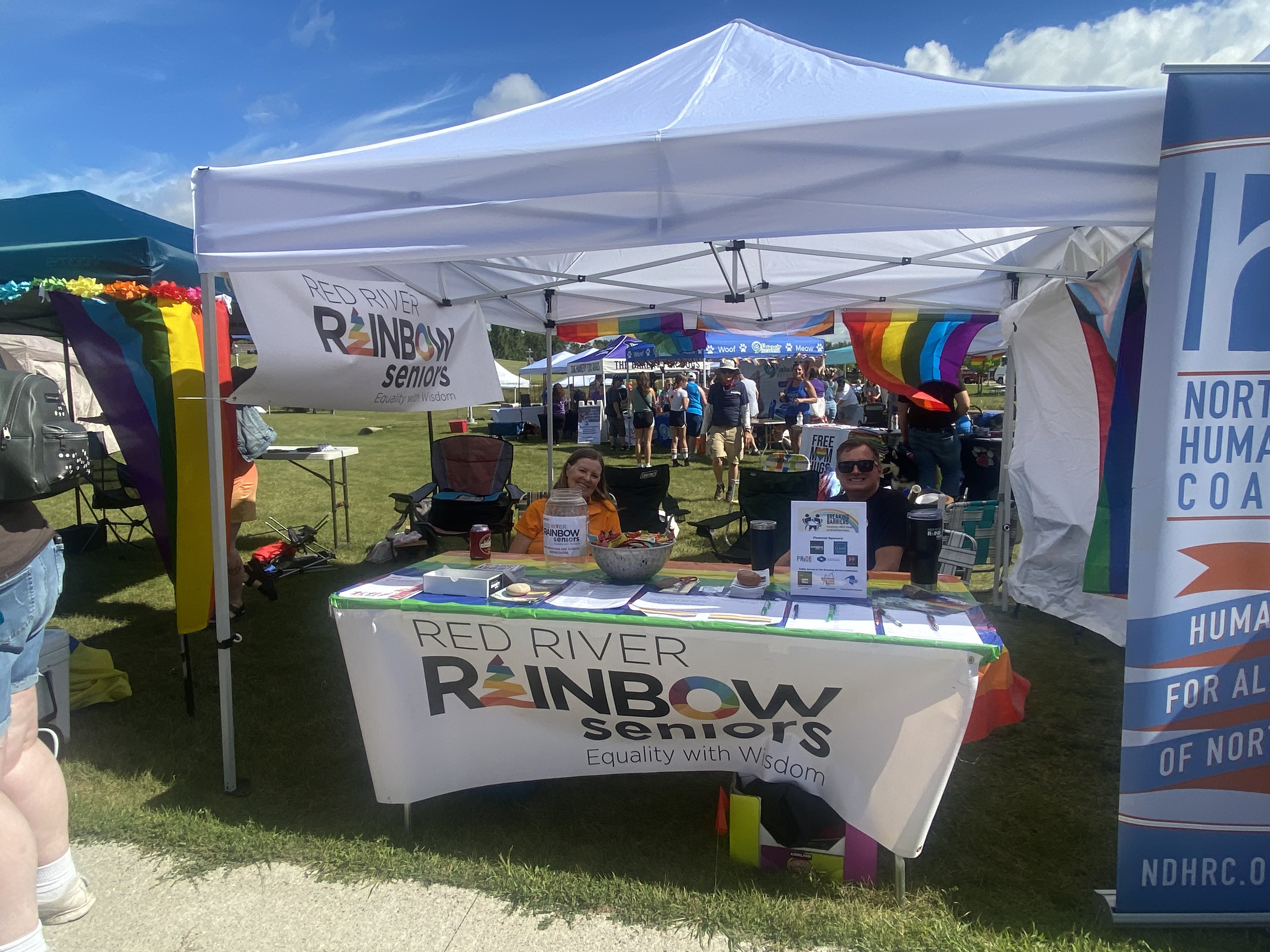
The Red River Rainbow Seniors supports LGBTQ+ life (50+) in the Red River Valley of North Dakota.

LGBTQ+ persons were not regarded in a distinctly positive light until the advent of the 21st century, with previous portrayals being less than favorable. Seniors were even more disregarded, with most of the literature and knowledge throughout the latter half of the 20th century being focused on youth. As Berger and Kelly noted in Gay men and Lesbians Grown Older, published by the American Psychiatric Association in 1996, "The older lesbian...is purported to be a cruel witch. Cold, unemotional, and heartless, she despises men. Devoted solely to masculine interests and career pursuits, she has no friends and is repeatedly frustrated by the rejections of younger women. The older gay man is said to become increasingly isolated and effeminate as he ages. Lacking family and friends, he is portrayed as desperately lonely. He must settle for no sex life at all, or he must prey upon young boys to satisfy his lust."

== Discrimination ==
There is a fear of discrimination on various counts within the LGBTQ+ community, characterized by "GLBT people [growing] older and [relying] more and more on public programs and social services for care and assistance. They may have less independence from heterosexist institutions. The fear of experiencing discrimination can reinforce social isolation, placing people at higher risk for self-neglect, decreased long-term quality life, and increased mortality risk".

=== Housing ===
By 2030, there will be about 120,000 to 300,000 older LGBT+ retirees in nursing homes. Despite seemingly rapid change in the national perception of LGBT+ people in America, LGBTQ+ seniors face a unique set of challenges in housing. Yearly, about four million fair housing violations occur, but even more so for those discriminated against via their sexual orientation. The U.S. Department of Housing and Urban Development released findings of discrepancies among the provisions given by housing providers, resulting in higher response rates for heterosexual rather than homosexual couples. In a specific case study featured in Michigan in 2007, persons who were LGB had "unfavorable treatment in 32 out of 120 (27%) tests conducted". This leads to perception of discrimination among the LGBTQ+ population, with a survey of 127 LGBTQ+ adults showing that 73% believed that retirement settings were grounds for discrimination, with a large majority believing there wouldn't be equal access to social or health services, and over thirty percent believing it would be necessary to hide their sexual orientation or gender identity to remain in a retirement facility.

=== Medical ===
In 1973, same-sex orientation was no longer viewed as a disorder, however, there has been much medical discrimination nonetheless.^{14} A 2002 survey found only three fourths of practicing physicians felt “very comfortable” taking care of an out LGB patient.

In a 2006 LAIN survey of LGBT baby boomers, less than fifty percent had confidence that healthcare workers would treat them with “dignity and respect” on account of their sexual orientation, tainting the doctor-patient relationship.

== Effects of politics and policy ==
=== Patient Protection and Affordable Care Act ===
The Affordable Care Act (2011) allows many LGBTQ+ elderly to afford health care and apply for Medicaid or more affordable private health insurance, regardless of state. They also cannot be denied coverage based on pre-existing conditions when ill, as well as helping seniors under 65 gain access to Medicaid, providing free Medicare in certain cases, and lowering drug costs. There is also the added implementation of the Elder Justice Act, providing a platform against mistreatment by providers and caregivers. The law also includes spousal protections for those receiving Medicaid, to which the Obama Administration issued guidance to state directors that same-sex partners be treated the same in terms of the Medicaid coverage.

=== Defense of Marriage Act and Obergefell v. Hodges ===
Elder benefits are heavily defined by benefits falling under the "elder safety net" such as social security, medicate, medicare, and retirement plans. The Defense of Marriage Act, passed in 1996, prevented same sex couples from attaining some of those benefits, among others, that are often given to heterosexual counterparts. When DOMA was in effect, LGBTQ+ people had lower rates of health insurance coverage than the general population due to higher costs from insurers. Federal law treated a partner's insurance as taxable income, and therefore the retirees would have to pay taxes on it; heterosexual couples would be able to get such benefits tax free, without the employers having to further pay payroll taxes on them as would employers of LGBTQ+ employees. Therefore, a lot of LGBTQ+ adults aren't offered such health care plans or simply can't afford them in the first place. As such, the Supreme Court-led dissolution of section three of said act in 2013, which defines marriage as between a man and a woman, opened up benefits to LGBTQ+ elderly. Only states that had already legalized same sex marriage could gain access to such benefits thereafter, but Obergefell v Hodges (2015) then legalized same-sex marriage nationwide, therefore giving marriage rights and the retirement abilities that come with that to LGBTQ+ citizens.

== Transgender-specific issues ==
The transgender population of the United States has been fairly hidden until the late 20th century, not being exposed to the national spotlight until recently, and only being declassified as a mental illness in 2012. As the earlier set of transgender population reaches retirement age, or as older persons come out as transgender, there are certain issues that have arisen. There is a large variance in medical treatment across the United States, for example; a lasting issue is the fact that many health insurance agencies “exclude coverage of transgender-specific health care, particularly surgery”. There is discrimination in this regard and in others, with The National Transgender Discrimination Survey having cited that almost thirty percent of respondents faced verbal harassment in a medical setting. About half of the respondents also had providers who did not fully cover or understand certain transgender needs. In another issue, biological sex can contribute to certain diseases or health issues, providing a doubling of health issues compiled with the latter attained sex in correlation with their gender.

=== Medical ===
As transgender elders retire, they are often disadvantaged in the health care system. Medicare and many private health insurance coverages "carry specific exclusions for transition-related care, which are sometimes interpreted in practice to deny coverage to transgender people for even basic medical care". The Federal Centers for Medicare and Medicaid Services (CMS) has reiterated the provision of "hormone replacement therapy and routine preventive care such as prostate screenings, mammograms, and pelvic exams, regardless of the gender marker in the individual’s Social Security record". These providers and the transgender patients are often unaware of such rules or of condition code 45, created by CMS in order to avoid automatic coverage denials in cases of gender discrepancies. Medicare also excludes sex reassignment surgery from its coverage, basing it as solely cosmetic. The policy "also encourages private insurers, state Medicaid plans, and the veterans’ health care system to continue to allow similar exclusions that target care for transgender people".

== See also ==
- AARP
- Ageing
- Domestic partnership
- Civil union
- Elderly care
- Geriatrics
- Gerontology
- LGBT ageing
- Listings by country
- Mandatory retirement
- Pension
- Registered partnership
- Same-sex marriage
- Social security
- Timeline of same-sex marriage

== Sources ==
- Gay retirement community is a first; December 11, 2006; By Bob Moos / The Dallas Morning News.
- A welcoming place for gay retirement: Historic hotel becomes Barbary Lane, based on popular 'Tales of the City' series; June 17, 2007; Judy Richter, San Francisco Chronicle
- Room under the rainbow?: Some residents of a gay-oriented retirement community have worries that adding too many straight neighbors might reopen the closet door.; October 5, 2007; By David Colker, Los Angeles Times
- Company plans housing for Vancouver's gay and grey; October 12, 2007; By Randy Shore, CanWest News Service
- Gay retirees worried over 'straight influx; 05/10/2007; By Catherine Elsworth, London Daily Telegraph
- Retirement Tips for LGBT Community; October 1, 2007; By The MetLife Mature Market Institute (from report, "Out and Aging: The MetLife Study of Lesbian and Gay Baby Boomers," can be found at: www.maturemarketinstitute.com under "Studies."); www.HealthNewsDigest.com
- Gay Retirement Communities Are Growing in Popularity; November 20, 2005; By Claire Wilson; New York Times
- Gay seniors settle into a niche; 7/5/2006; By John Ritter, USA TODAY
- Kornblum, Janet (July 8, 1997). "Gay and gray - gay and lesbian retirement communities". The Advocate (737). Archived from the original on December 19, 2007 – via FindArticles.
- Retirement Trends: Hot Senior Communities, Gay Retirement Communities; AOL Money & Finance
- Gray and Gay? These Communities Want You; By Lee Hockstader; Washington Post; Monday, May 31, 2004; Page A01
- Retirees Create Alternative Communities: More Elderly Americans Are Drawn to Communities That Reflect Their Particular Interests; By MARC LALLANILLA; Oct. 26, 2005; ABC News
- No Straight Answers: America’s older gays and lesbians struggle with health care, inheritance, retirement benefits, social services, prejudice, and more; By Randy B. Hecht, May & June 2004; AARP Magazine
- Breaking the Silence: LGBT Seniors Making Great Strides; May 2011; NYC Senior Care
- The Silent Population: Mounting Issues Facing a Growing LGBT Senior Population; May 2011; NYC Senior Care
