= Crawford Barton =

American photographer (1943–1993)

- Born: June 2, 1943; Georgia, U.S.
- Died: June 12, 1993 (aged 50); San Francisco, California, U.S.

Crawford Barton (June 2, 1943 – June 12, 1993) was an American photographer. His work is known for documenting the inception of the openly gay culture in San Francisco from the late 1960s into the 1980s.

== Biography ==
Born and raised in a fundamentalist community in Georgia, Barton was shy and introspective. His artistic interests and fear of sports alienated him from his father who was a farmer. He escaped his family tensions by gaining a scholarship and enrolling in the University of Georgia.

It was there that Barton had homosexual relations for the first time. After a single semester, he dropped out of college and returned to the farm.

A couple of years later, at age 21, he enrolled in art school in Atlanta. He made new friends and found outlets for his sexual energy in the city's gay bars and clubs. During this time in Atlanta, Barton received a used 35mm camera as a gift and learned basic darkroom techniques, leading him to adopt photography as the primary artistic medium he worked with.

Barton moved to California in the late 1960s to pursue his art and life as an openly gay man. By the early 1970s, he was established as a leading photographer of the “golden age of gay awakening” in San Francisco.

“I tried to serve as a chronicler, as a watcher of beautiful people — to feed back an image of a positive, likable lifestyle — to offer pleasure as well as pride,” he explained.

By the early 1980s this period was over. San Francisco and the local gay community were devastated by the onset of the AIDS epidemic. Barton's lover of 22 years, Larry Lara, died of complications from AIDS before Barton himself succumbed at the age of 50 in 1993.

== Career ==
Many of Barton's images documenting long-haired men dancing in the street, lovers in the park, cross-dressers and men prowling at night have become popular in gay culture. He photographed some of the first Gay Pride parades and protests; Harvey Milk campaigning in San Francisco; and celebrities including poet Lawrence Ferlinghetti and actors Sal Mineo and Paul Winfield.

In addition to his photography, Barton worked on assignment for The Advocate and the Bay Area Reporter, as well as The Examiner, Newsday', and the Los Angeles Times.

== Exhibitions ==
In 1974, the M. H. de Young Memorial Museum featured Barton's prints in a show entitled "New Photography: San Francisco and the Bay Area." His work was praised by The New York Times reviewer. Other critics labeled it “shocking” and “vulgar.”

Barton's photography has continued appearing periodically in exhibitions since his death, notably in one-artist shows at the GLBT Historical Society in San Francisco and the San Francisco LGBT Community Center in 2004 and at the Magnet men's health center in the city's Castro District in 2005. Barton's photographs of Harvey Milk were also featured in a historical exhibition cosponsored by the GLBT Historical Society at the Nouveau Latina Cinema in Paris in 2009 in conjunction with the French release of Gus Van Sant's Milk.

== Archives and copyrights ==
The GLBT Historical Society, an archives, research center and museum in San Francisco, holds the complete personal and professional papers and studio archives of Crawford Barton; in addition, the society owns the copyrights to Barton's work, which were transferred to the institution by the Barton estate.

== Bibliography ==
- Barton, Crawford, Beautiful Men. Los Angeles: Liberation Publications, 1976.
- Barton, Crawford. Days of Hope. Foreword by Mark Thompson. London: Editions Aubrey Walter, 1994.
- Barton, Crawford & Boyd, Malcolm, Look Back in Joy: A Celebration of Gay Lovers. Boston: Alyson Press, 1990.
