= LGBTQ ageing =

Issues and concerns of older LGBTQ people

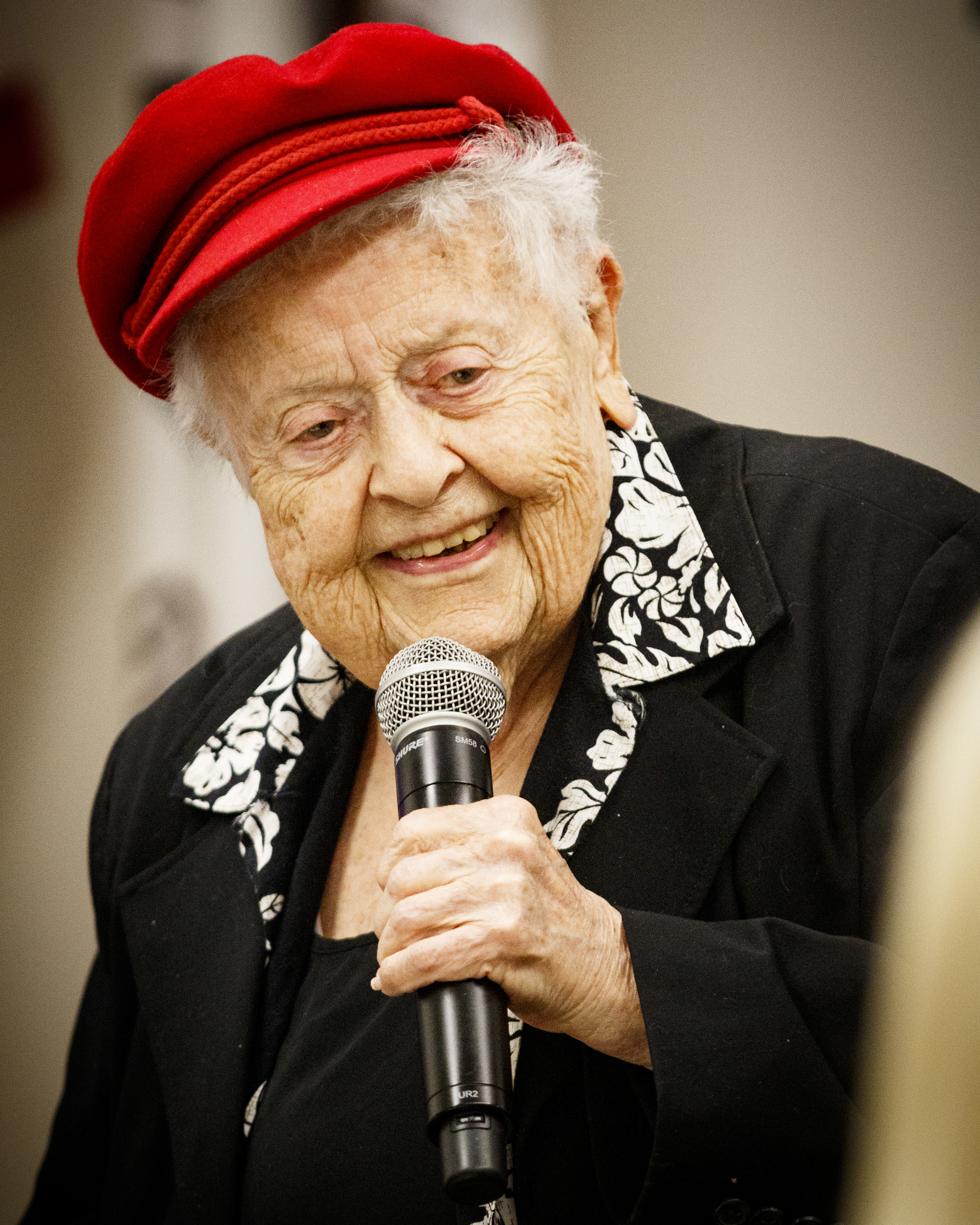
Ivy Bottini, LGBTQ rights advocate, speaking at Stonewall Democratic Club on January 28, 2019

LGBTQ ageing addresses issues and concerns related to the ageing of lesbian, gay, bisexual, transgender and queer (LGBTQ) people. Due to historic and current discrimination, LGBTQ people are less likely to have access to appropriate healthcare and housing. These inequities, as well as common differences in family and social structure, lead to differences in the social support systems available for ageing LGBTQ people. Research on LGBTQ ageing is still emerging, as are policy and community-based approaches to improving the quality of life of LGBTQ seniors.

== Research overview ==
There has been a growth of interest in lesbian, gay, bisexual and transgender ageing in recent years, particularly in academic literature from the USA, the UK, Australia, Canada, the Netherlands, Israel and Ireland.

The earliest waves of research sought ‘to challenge the image of the lonely and bitter old queer’ and ‘suggested that older gay men and lesbians are not alone, isolated, or depressed but benefit from navigating a stigmatized identity through crisis competence’, which also informs resilience in dealing with inequalities associated with older age. Subsequent authors questioned the positive bias which may have been present in some of these initial studies. More recent research has focused on health, housing and social care and support needs, older LGBT rights and also the differences between and among older LGBT individuals, particularly in relation to gender. There is a lack of research on black, Asian and minority ethnic (BAME) older LGBT individuals, ageing and bisexuality, issues of class and other intersections.

== Informal social support ==
Present cohorts of older lesbian, gay and bisexual (LGB) people are more likely to be estranged from their biological families, less likely to have children, and thus less likely to have access to intergenerational social support in later life. They may have strong 'chosen family' networks, but as these tend to be formed by people of similar ages, these networks may not necessarily be able to provide the needed care and support during old age. This means that older LGB people are more likely to need formal social care and support sooner than older heterosexual people, particularly for those whose partner has died.

Older transgender people, particularly those who have transitioned in later life, can experience rejection from biological families and so even those with children may lack access to intergenerational support.

== Housing and social care ==
Mainstream housing and social care provision (domicilary/home care, community care, supported housing, retirement and nursing home facilities) is often ill-equipped to meet the needs of older LGBT people. Many older LGBT people currently living in older age accommodation or care spaces feel the need to conceal their lives, identities and significant relationships if they can. They fear being misunderstood, vulnerable to prejudice and discrimination or isolated from their families and friends. They may be especially concerned about whether their identities will be respected, their memories validated, and their needs advocated for if they develop dementia.

In response to these issues and concerns a range of guidelines have been developed in the US for cultural competency and in the UK and Australia for more practical step-by-step advice However, it is not yet clear the extent to which providers of services for older people are following these guidelines, and many older LGBT people continue to consider older age care spaces to be unsafe places in which to spend their final years.

== Mental Health and LGBTQ Ageing ==
Mental health issues disproportionately affect LGBTQ individuals, leading to concerns of aging and lifespans in queer communities. Higher suicide rates have been identified in Queer communities compared to their cisgender and heterosexual counterparts.

== See also ==
- LGBT Aging Project
- LGBT retirement issues in the United States
- Nursing home care
- Services & Advocacy for GLBT Elders
- LGBT
- LGBT culture

== Complementary references ==
- Heaphy, Brian Yip, Andrew and Thompson, Debbie (2004). ‘Ageing In A Non-Heterosexual Context.’ Ageing & Society, 24(6): 881–902.
- Heaphy, Brian (2009). ‘The Storied, Complex Lives of Older GLBT Adults; Choice and its limits in older lesbian and gay narratives of relational life.’ Journal of GLBT Family Studies, 5: 119–138.
- Jones, Rebecca (2011). ‘Imagining bisexual futures: Positive, non-normative later life.’ Journal of Bisexuality, 11(2–3): 245–270.
- Jones, R. & R. Ward (eds) LGBT Issues: Looking Beyond Categories: 42–55. Edinburgh: Dunedin.
- Persson, D. I. (2009). Unique challenges of transgender aging: Implications from the literature. Journal of Gerontological Social Work, 52(6), 633–646.
- Rosenfeld, Dana (2003). The Changing of the Guard: Lesbian and Gay Elders, Identity and Social Change. Philadelphia: Temple University Press.
- Sullivan, K M, 2014, Acceptance in the Domestic Environment: The Experience of Senior Housing for Lesbian, Gay, Bisexual, and Transgender Seniors, Journal of Gerontological Social Work, 57(2–4), 235–250.
- Traies, Jane (2012). ‘Women Like That: Older Lesbians in the UK.’ In R. Ward, I. Rivers and M. Sutherland (eds) Lesbian, Gay, Bisexual and Transgender Ageing: Biographical Approaches for Inclusive Care and Support, pp 76–82, London and Philadelphia: Jessica Kingsley.
- Wathern, T, 2013, Building a sense of community: Including older LGBT in the way we develop and deliver housing with care, London: Housing Learning & Improvement Network.
- Westwood, S. (2013) ‘My Friends are my Family’: an argument about the limitations of contemporary law's recognition of relationships in later life. Journal of Social Welfare & Family Law 35(3), 347–363.
- Wilkens, Jill. (2015). Loneliness and Belongingness in Older Lesbians: The Role of Social Groups as “Community”. Journal of lesbian studies, 19(1), 90–101.
- Willis, P, et al., 2014, Swimming upstream: the provision of inclusive care to older lesbian, gay and bisexual (LGB) adults in residential and nursing environments in Wales, Ageing & Society, DOI: 10.1017/S0144686X14001147.
- Witten, T.M. (2015) Elder Transgender Lesbians: Exploring the Intersection of Age, Lesbian Sexual Identity, and Transgender Identity, Journal of Lesbian Studies, 19(1), 73–89.
- Hughes, Anne K.; Harold, Rena D.; Boyer, Janet M. (2011). "Awareness of LGBT Aging Issues Among Aging Services Network Providers". Journal of Gerontological Social Work. 54 (7): 659–677. doi:10.1080/01634372.2011.585392. PMID 21967137. S2CID 24364138.
- Brown, Maria T. (2009). "LGBT aging and rhetorical silence". Sexuality Research and Social Policy. 6 (4): 65–78. doi:10.1525/srsp.2009.6.4.65. S2CID 45209545.
- Kimmel, Douglas C.; Rose, Tara; David, Steven (2006). Lesbian, Gay, Bisexual, and Transgender Aging: Research and Clinical Perspectives. Columbia University Press. ISBN 978-0-231-13618-1.
- Porter, Kristen E.; Krinsky, Lisa (2014). "Do LGBT Aging Trainings Effectuate Positive Change in Mainstream Elder Service Providers?". Journal of Homosexuality. 61 (1): 197–216. doi:10.1080/00918369.2013.835618. PMID 24313259. S2CID 25444713.
- Fredriksen Goldsen, Karen; de Vries, Brian (2019). "Global Aging With Pride: Two-Part Special Issue on International Perspectives on LGBT Aging". The International Journal of Aging and Human Development. 88 (4): 315–324. doi:10.1177/0091415019837648. PMC 6815223. PMID 30947513.
