= Gen Silent =

- Directed by: Stu Maddux
- Produced by: Stu Maddux; Joseph Applebaum
- Distributed by: Interrobang Productions
- Release date: February 18, 2010 (Boston LGBT Film Festival)
- Running time: 63 minutes
- Country: United States
- Language: English

Gen Silent is a 2010 documentary film, directed and produced by Stu Maddux. The documentary follows the lives of six LGBT seniors living in the Boston area who must choose if they will hide their sexuality in order to survive in the long-term health care system. It has been screened at numerous colleges and universities as well as in front of government agencies and healthcare organizations. It premiered at the Boston LGBT Film Festival and has won numerous awards at others.

The title of the film is a reference to the generations of older LGBT people who remain in the closet or reenter the closet out of concern for their safety or quality of life. As a result of the documentary, the term Gen Silent has increased in use as a way to refer to this group.

== Synopsis ==
Gen Silent was filmed in the Boston area over a one-year period. During that time, director Stu Maddux followed six LGBT seniors through their decision to either stay open about their sexuality or hide it so that they can survive in the long-term health care system. In the documentary a gay man named Lawrence Johnson searches for a nursing home where he and his partner can be open about their relationship while still receiving quality care. It also follows a transgender senior by the name of KrysAnne. She searches for people to care for her because she is estranged from her family. The story of an LGBT couple named Sheri and Lois is told, including how they spent their lives fighting for LGBT rights. While Sheri states that she refuses to hide her sexuality, Lois states that she will if that is what it would take to protect her in the health care system. Mel and his partner are the final couple followed in the documentary. Mel's partner gets sick and he finds care from a welcoming agency where he feels comfortable and safe to speak openly for the first time about his sexuality and their 39-year relationship together.

== Notable screenings ==
Gen Silent premiered at the Boston LGBT Film Festival in 2010. It was also screened at numerous other film festivals including the Frameline Film Festival, the Provincetown International Film Festival, the New York Lesbian, Gay, Bisexual, & Transgender Film Festival, the Melbourne Queer Film Festival and the North Carolina Gay & Lesbian Film Festival.

It was also screened for health care staff at Duke University Medical Center, to lawmakers at the Massachusetts House of Representatives, and at the University of Michigan in Ann Arbor. Harvard and Yale Universities have also hosted screenings of the film. Several screenings were held in South Florida and were featured on the front page of Ft. Lauderdale's main newspaper, the Sun-Sentinel.

== Awards and Recognitions ==
Gen Silent has won multiple awards including the Audience Choice Best Documentary at the Frameline Film Festival in 2011 and the Audience Choice Best Documentary at the Image+Nation Montreal International LGBT Film Festival.

=== Select awards ===
Year	Award name	Organization
2010	Audience Award for Best Documentary	Sacramento Film & Music Festival
2010	Jury Award for Best Documentary	Sacramento Film & Music Festival
2011	Alternative Spirit Award	Rhode Island International Film Festival
2011	Audience Choice for Best Documentary	Frameline Film Festival
2011	Audience Award for Best Documentary	Connecticut Gay & Lesbian Film Festival
2010	Audience Award for Best Documentary	Charlotte Film Festival
