= GLBT Historical Society =

American non-profit LGBT historical society

- GLBT Historical Society Logo
- Formation: March 1985; 41 years ago
- Type: Nonprofit
- Legal status: registered 501(c)(3) nonprofit organization
- Purpose: LGBTQ history, human rights
- Headquarters: San Francisco
- Region served: United States of America
- Executive Director: Roberto Ordeñana
- Co-chairs: Jaime Santos & Ani Rivera
- Revenue: $1,368,330
- Staff: 8
- Website: www.glbthistory.org

The GLBT Historical Society (Gay, Lesbian, Bisexual, Transgender Historical Society) (formerly Gay and Lesbian Historical Society of Northern California; San Francisco Bay Area Gay and Lesbian Historical Society) maintains an extensive collection of archival materials, artifacts and graphic arts relating to LGBTQ history in the United States, with a focus on the LGBTQ communities of San Francisco and Northern California.

The society also sponsors the GLBT Historical Society Museum, a stand-alone museum that has attracted international attention. The Swedish Exhibition Agency has cited the institution as one of just "three established museums dedicated to LGBTQ history in the world" as of 2016. It is also the first full-scale, stand-alone museum of lesbian, gay, bisexual and transgender history in the United States (and only the second in the world after the Schwules Museum in Berlin). The grand opening of the museum took place on the evening of January 13, 2011.

Referred to as San Francisco's "queer Smithsonian", the GLBT Historical Society is one of approximately 30 LGBTQ archives in the United States—and is among the handful of such organizations to benefit from a paid staff and to function as a full-fledged center for exhibitions, programming, research, and production of oral histories. It is recognized by the Internal Revenue Service as a tax-exempt 501(c)(3) educational association and is registered with the State of California as a nonprofit corporation.

The archives, reading room and administrative offices of the GLBT Historical Society are located at 989 Market St., Lower Level, in San Francisco's Mid-Market district. The GLBT Historical Society Museum, which serves as a separate center for exhibitions and programs, is located at 4127 18th St. in the city's Castro neighborhood.

== Organizational history ==
=== Founding ===
The main gallery at the GLBT Historical Society headquarters at 657 Mission St., San Francisco; opening of the "Polk Street: Lives in Transition" exhibition, curated by Joey Plaster (Jan. 16, 2009).

The roots of the Gay, Lesbian, Bisexual, Transgender Historical Society extend to the early 1980s, when Willie Walker and Greg Pennington met and discovered that they shared an interest in gay and lesbian history. They joined forces to pool their personal collections of gay and lesbian periodicals, dubbing the ad hoc initiative the San Francisco Gay Periodical Archive.

At the same time, Walker was involved in a private study group, the San Francisco Lesbian and Gay History Project; among its members were a number of individuals who would go on to make major cultural contributions, including historians Allan Bérubé and Estelle Freedman, independent scholar Jeffrey Escoffier, author and community organizer Amber Hollibaugh, and anthropologist and queer theorist Gayle Rubin.

Each member of the Lesbian and Gay History Project was asked to develop a major project for presentation to the group; as his contribution, Walker produced a proposal for a historical society to preserve the records of Bay Area gay and lesbian history and to make this history available to the community. Walker presented the concept at the History Project meeting on Sept. 5, 1984, and with encouragement from the project, Walker, Pennington, project member Eric Garber and several others held five working meetings before deciding that the plan would require a much larger and more diverse organizing group.

According to the GLBT Historical Society newsletter, "With this in mind, Walker sent a letter to 160 organizations and 100 individuals inviting them to what turned out to be the pivotal meeting at the San Francisco Public Library on March 16, 1985. There were 63 people at the library that Saturday afternoon. 'We made the decision that everyone at the meeting was a member,' Pennington remembers. 'And we chose the name, the San Francisco Bay Area Gay and Lesbian Historical Society. On May 18, we held a public membership meeting to adopt the bylaws and elect the first board of directors.'"

=== Name changes ===
Over the course of its history, the Historical Society has renamed itself twice to better reflect the scope of its holdings and the range of identities and practices represented in its collections and programs. Founded as the San Francisco Bay Area Gay and Lesbian Historical Society in 1985, the organization became the Gay and Lesbian Historical Society of Northern California in 1990, thus clarifying the geographical reach of its primary collections. In 1999, the organization changed its name for the second time, becoming the Gay, Lesbian, Bisexual, Transgender Historical Society in response to concerns raised by bisexual and transgender community members and their allies and to more clearly state the inclusive mission the society had pursued since it was founded. In everyday usage, the institution generally employs a short form of its name: the GLBT Historical Society.

=== Locations ===
The archival collections of the Historical Society initially were housed in the living room of Walker's apartment at 3823 17th St. in San Francisco. In 1990, the society moved into its own space, in the basement of the Redstone Building on 16th Street near South Van Ness — a building which also housed the gay and lesbian theater company Theater Rhinoceros. The collections grew constantly, and by 1995 the Historical Society moved into a 3,700-square-foot (340 m^{2}) space on the fourth floor of 973 Market St.

The society moved again in 2003 to a location on the third floor of a building at 657 Mission St. that also housed other cultural institutions: the Cartoon Art Museum, San Francisco Camerawork and the Catharine Clark Gallery. The 6,600-square-foot (610 m^{2}) space included two dedicated exhibition galleries, a reading room, a large reserve for the archival collections, and several offices for staff and volunteers. The society regularly used one of the galleries for presentation of history talks and panel discussions, many of which were videotaped for posting on the Web. In November 2010, in anticipation of the opening of its new GLBT History Museum, the society closed its galleries and program space at 657 Mission St., while maintaining its archives, reading room and administrative offices at that location.

At the end of May 2016, the GLBT Historical Society closed its archives at 657 Mission St. in preparation for a move to an expanded space with improved facilities for researchers and staff at 989 Market St. in San Francisco. The archives reopened at the end of June 2016 at the new location, which offers 6,500-square-foot (600 m^{2}) devoted to archival and office space.

=== Executive directors ===
The Historical Society has had six executive directors during the course of its history. The organization was run directly by the Board of Directors from 1985 to 1998. In 1998, the board hired the first paid executive director, Susan Stryker, Ph.D. Stryker was succeeded in 2003 by an acting interim executive director, Daniel Bao, who served until the board hired Terence Kissack, Ph.D., in 2004. Kissack served until the end of 2006. Paul Boneberg took over the post at the beginning of January 2007, serving until May 2015. An acting executive director, Daryl Carr, then headed the society on an interim basis.

The institution's board of directors appointed Terry Beswick as the permanent executive director starting February 2, 2016; Beswick's experience included nonprofit leadership, fundraising, government affairs and activism. Beswick served for five-and-a-half years including successfully leading the institution through the coronavirus pandemic lockdown. He resigned effective September 15, 2021, to take the post of executive director at the Golden Gate Business Association. Beswick was replaced by two interim acting executive directors: Kelsi Evans, the society's director of archives and special collections, and Andrew Shaffer, the director of development and communications.

The board of the Historical Society appointed Roberto Ordeñana as the new executive director in October 2022. Ordeñana came to the society from his previous position as deputy executive director of the San Francisco LGBT Community Center and as president of the San Francisco Arts Commission.

=== Pop-up museum (2008–2009) ===
From November 2008 through October 2009, the GLBT Historical Society sponsored a pop-up museum in the Castro District at the corner of 18th and Castro streets; the space featured an exhibition, "Passionate Struggle: Dynamics of San Francisco's GLBT History", that traced more than a century of the city's LGBTQ history using documents and artifacts from the society's collections. The exhibition was curated by Don Romesburg, assistant professor of women's and gender studies at Sonoma State University, and Amy Sueyoshi, associate professor of race and resistance studies and sexuality studies at San Francisco State University, with assistance from a curatorial committee of academics and independent scholars.

Among the objects displayed were a preliminary study for the MaestraPeace mural on the façade of the San Francisco Women's Building, the sewing machine used by designer Gilbert Baker to create the first rainbow flag, and the suit worn by openly gay San Francisco Supervisor Harvey Milk when he was assassinated on Nov. 27, 1978. Approximately 25,000 people from throughout the United States and around the world visited the exhibition during its 11-month run.

== Archival holdings ==
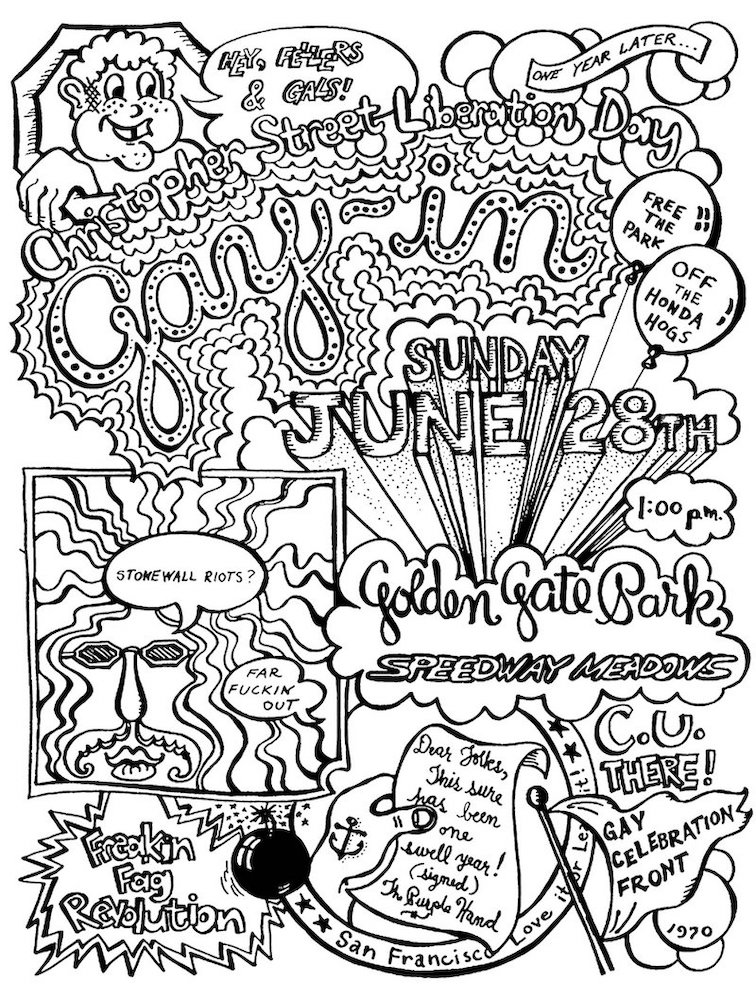
"Christopher Street Liberation Day Gay-In" flyer, 1970. From the Charles Thorpe Papers (1987-02).

The GLBT Historical Society is home to one of the largest LGBTQ historical archives in the United States, with more than 500 manuscript collections and nearly 200 non-manuscript collections; 70 linear feet of ephemera; approximately 4,000 periodical titles; approximately 80,000 photographs; approximately 3,000 imprinted T-shirts; approximately 5,000 posters; nearly 500 oral histories; approximately 1,000 hours of recorded sound; and approximately 1,000 hours of film and video. The archives also has extensive holdings of historic textiles, works of fine and graphic arts, and artifacts.

Among the noteworthy manuscript collections are more than 200 boxes of material donated by early lesbian activists Del Martin and Phyllis Lyon. Lyon and Martin were cofounders of the Daughters of Bilitis, the first lesbian organization in the United States, and their papers at the society include the complete surviving office records of the organization.

The society's holdings also include a substantial group of administrative records from the Mattachine Society, the first enduring homosexual rights organization in the United States. The records form part of the papers of Donald S. Lucas, who served as secretary of the Mattachine Society during much of its history. In addition, the society's archives house the records of José Sarria, who as a candidate in the race for the San Francisco Board of Supervisors in 1961 was the first openly gay person known to have run for elected office anywhere in the world.

The society likewise holds numerous manuscript collections documenting the history of transgender individuals and movements in Northern California, including the complete papers of Lou Sullivan, founder of the pioneering female-to-male transsexual organization FTM International. Holdings focused on the history of bisexuality include the typescript and research files for "Bisexuality and Androgyny: An Analysis," the 1975 master's thesis in psychology by Maggi Rubenstein, cofounder of San Francisco Sex Information and the San Francisco Bisexual Center.

The GLBT Historical Society's artifacts collection includes the personal effects of Harvey Milk, the first openly gay elected official in California. Milk's executors preserved a significant selection of his belongings after he was assassinated in 1978; they ultimately were inherited by the mother of Milk's former partner, Scott Smith, who donated them to the GLBT Historical Society. The collection includes everyday objects such the battered, gold-painted kitchen table from Milk's apartment and several antique cameras that had been displayed at Castro Camera, his shop in San Francisco's Castro District. The collection also includes the suit, shirt, belt and shoes Milk was wearing when he was shot to death by assassin Dan White.

Searchable catalogs of the society's manuscript collections, periodicals holdings and oral histories are available on the institution's website, and complete finding aids for the ephemera collections and many of the manuscript collections are available through the Online Archive of California (a project of the California Digital Library).

The "Passionate Struggle" exhibition at the GLBT Historical Society's temporary museum in the Castro neighborhood (Feb. 7, 2009)

== Periodical publications ==
From June 1985 through November 2007, the GLBT Historical Society published 50 issues of a print newsletter. Produced at various points in its run as a bimonthly, a quarterly and an irregularly issued periodical, the publication appeared under several titles: San Francisco Bay Area Gay and Lesbian Historical Society Newsletter, Newsletter of the Gay and Lesbian Historical Society of Northern California, Our Stories and It's About Time.

In February 2008, the print newsletter was succeeded by an ongoing electronic newsletter, History Happens, published monthly until 2014, then bimonthly, before returning to a monthly schedule in late 2015. Links to the current issue and several years of back issues are available on the GLBT Historical Society website. In addition, the society published three issues of a twice-yearly print journal, Fabulas, which appeared in 2008–2009.

== GLBT Historical Society Museum ==
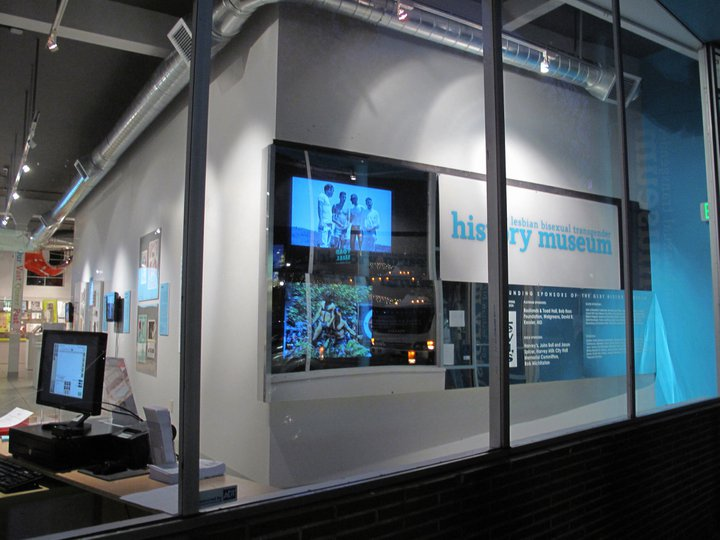
The GLBT History Museum in San Francisco on the evening that it opened for previews, Dec 10, 2010

On Dec. 10, 2010, the GLBT Historical Society opened its GLBT History Museum in the Castro District for previews. The society slightly modified the name of the space in November 2018, redubbing it the GLBT Historical Society Museum.

Located in a storefront at 4127 18th St. near Castro Street, the 1,600-square-foot (150 m^{2}) space houses two historical galleries with room for public programs, a small museum shop and a reception area. The institution is believed to be the second full-scale, stand-alone GLBT history museum in the world, following the Schwules Museum in Berlin, which opened in 1985.

The society signed an initial five-year lease for the space in late 2010; the extensive build-out of the museum, along with a significant discount on the monthly rent, was donated by Walgreen Company, which holds the primary lease and uses about one-quarter of the storefront as an extension for operations of its adjacent satellite pharmacy. In March 2015, the society renewed the lease for a second five-year term.

=== Grand opening ===
The grand opening of the museum took place on the evening of Jan. 13, 2011. The newly appointed interim mayor of San Francisco, Edwin M. Lee, cut a rainbow ribbon to officially inaugurate the museum; in addition, he presented a proclamation declaring the date "GLBT History Museum Day" in San Francisco. It was Lee's first appearance as mayor at a public event. Also in attendance was Scott Wiener, newly elected as the member of the San Francisco Board of Supervisors for the district including the Castro neighborhood—the seat once held by Harvey Milk—as well as openly gay Supervisor David Campos, who represents the neighboring Mission District. Other guests included pioneering lesbian activist Phyllis Lyon, novelist Armistead Maupin, photographer Daniel Nicoletta, former supervisor and then mayoral candidate Bevan Dufty, and noted drag personality Donna Sachet.

The launch of the institution drew extraordinary media attention from across the United States and around the world. Thousands of newspapers, magazines, television and radio broadcasts, blogs and other outlets in at least 75 countries and 38 languages covered the opening. U.S. media that ran stories include the Huffington Post, the Washington Post, CNN en Español, MSNBC and CBS Radio. Outside the United States, coverage included national television in Italy and Spain; radio in Belgium, Columbia and Venezuela; and newspapers and magazines such as Emarat Al Youm (United Arab Emirates), Reforma (Mexico), Tempo (Indonesia), the South China Morning Post, The Times of India and Večernji list (Croatia). Links to a sampling of stories on the museum along with the full media report are available on the museum website.

=== Debut exhibitions ===
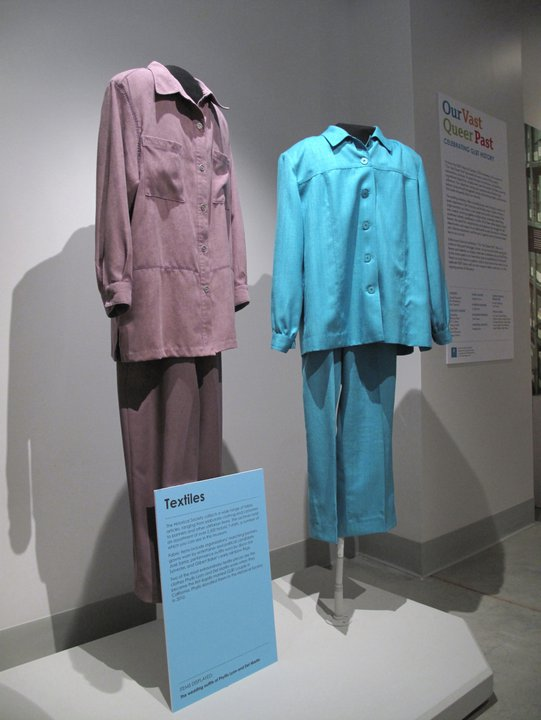
Pantsuits worn by Del Martin and Phyllis Lyon to their weddings in San Francisco in 2004 and 2008; on display at the GLBT History Museum.

The GLBT History Museum debuted with two multimedia exhibitions. In the larger main gallery, "Our Vast Queer Past: Celebrating San Francisco's GLBT History" traced more than 20 key themes in the past 100 years of the history of LGBTQ people and communities in San Francisco and the Bay Area. Curated by historians Gerard Koskovich, Don Romesburg and Amy Sueyoshi with help from seven associate curators, the show included more than 450 objects, photographs, documents, costumes, and film and video clips. All the materials were from the society's collections, and most had never before been displayed.

Among the items in the exhibition were the 1919 honorable discharge of gay novelist Clarkson Crane, who served in World War I; the only known photograph of gay men held in the camps that the United States created for the Japanese-American internment during World War II; documents reflecting the life of female-to-male transsexual organizer and author Lou Sullivan (1950–1991); an extravagant 1983 gown worn by San Francisco drag personality the Baroness Eugenia von Dieckoff (1920–1988); and photographs, flyers and T-shirts from the lesbian sex wars of the 1980s-1990s.

In the smaller front gallery, "Great Collections From the GLBT Historical Society Archives," curated by Historical Society Executive Director Paul Boneberg, offered an introduction to the kinds of materials collected by the society. Among the items on display were a distinctive example of the society's collection of textiles: the pantsuits that Del Martin and Phyllis Lyon wore to their wedding during San Francisco's "Winter of Love" in 2004 and again in 2008 when they became the first couple to wed during the brief period when the state's high court legalized same-sex marriage in California. On exhibit as examples of the society's artifacts collections were personal belongings of Harvey Milk. In addition, the show included examples from the society's collections of ephemera; posters; periodicals; photographs; oral history interviews; and film, video and recorded sound.

=== Changing exhibitions ===
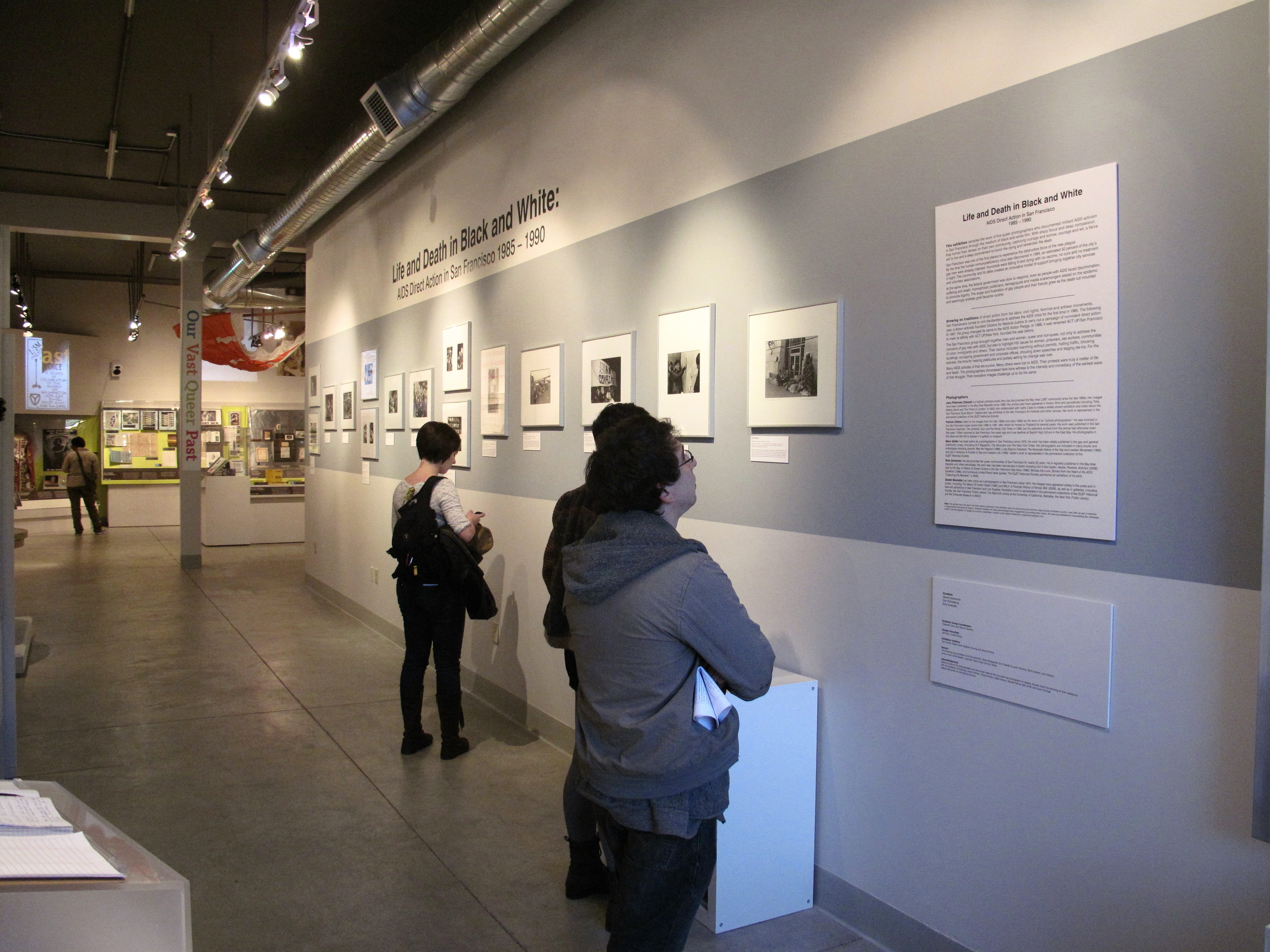
Visitors viewing "Life and Death in Black and White: AIDS Direct Action in San Francisco, 1985–1990" in the Front Gallery of The GLBT History Museum (March 2012).

The debut show in the front gallery of the museum closed at the end of February 2012; the museum then launched a program of periodically changing exhibitions in the space.

The first of these shows opened in early March 2012: "Life and Death in Black and White: AIDS Direct Action in San Francisco, 1985–1990." The exhibition focused on the work of five photographers—Jane Philomen Cleland, Patrick Clifton, Marc Geller, Rick Gerharter and Daniel Nicoletta—who used the medium of black-and-white film to document the emergence of militant protests in response to the AIDS epidemic in San Francisco.

The Bay Area Reporter characterized the show as "a concise, laser-focused exhibition ... of 17 carefully selected black-and-white photographs," adding that it "distills the tenor of those times and provides a microcosm of what was at stake as the federal government, either out of obliviousness, callousness, prejudice or a combination of all three, turned a blind eye and deaf ear to the proliferation and devastating impact of the disease."

The Huffington Post review noted that "the exhibition highlights the pain, the rage and the bravery involved in the fight for AIDS awareness. The crisp and clean black and white photos bring a feeling of control and simplicity to a time of chaos, when an unnamed disease targeted half of the city's gay men and government agencies seemed incapable of listening. Yet in the darkest times come the brightest inspirations, as thousands of San Franciscans rose to the challenge and fought for their voices to be heard.

"The striking images capture protestors, students and policemen, chanting, fighting, and just living their lives. In a way it is hard to believe these photos were taken so recently, from 1985-1990. And yet the photographs are good reminders of the fights we are still facing today, from marriage equality to the Occupy movement. These activists showed that civil disobedience can impact political outcomes."

In addition to the larger shows in its main and front galleries, The GLBT Historical Society Museum mounts temporary exhibits displayed for approximately one month each, most consisting of a single display case devoted to a timely topic or significant anniversary in San Francisco LGBTQ history. Eight such temporary exhibits took place during 2011.

=== Group tours ===
As part of its educational mission, The GLBT Historical Society Museum offers group tours led by trained volunteer docents and occasionally by the exhibition curators. According to the museum home page, any group of 10 or more people may book a guided tour by making an appointment at least two weeks in advance.

The tours have been especially popular with professors and teachers who bring their classes and with student organizations including gay–straight alliance groups from junior high schools and high schools. In its first 18 months of operation, the museum reported that it had given guided tours for more than 50 classes and student groups, including the GSA from Aragon High School in San Mateo, California; classes from San Francisco State University; students from the San Francisco Police Academy; and Japanese medical students.

=== Funding ===
Funding for the museum has come from presenting sponsor Levi's (Levi Strauss & Co.); the City and County of San Francisco; Starbucks; the Bob Ross Foundation; neighborhood merchants such as Badlands, Harvey's restaurant and bar, and Toad Hall; and numerous individual donors.

=== Hours and admission ===
The GLBT Historical Society Museum is open Tuesday through Sunday, 11 a.m. to 5 p.m. General admission is $10.00. Discounted admission of $6.00 is offered to youth (ages 13–17); seniors (age 65 and over); students and teachers (with ID); active-duty military service members (with ID); and people with disabilities. Admission is free for members of the GLBT Historical Society. On Saturdays, admission is free for all visitors courtesy of a sponsorship by the Bob Ross Foundation.

== Vision 2020 "New Museum" campaign ==
In June 2016, the GLBT Historical Society announced a long-term initiative to build a "new museum of LGBTQ history and culture"—a world-class center for LGBTQ public history projected for completion in the coming decade; the center would include expanded galleries and archives, new spaces for hosting public programs and researchers, and other enhanced facilities.

The organization launched the campaign, dubbed Vision 2020, with fundraising for capacity building. Early in 2017, the San Francisco Board of Supervisors passed a resolution "calling on municipal authorities, philanthropists and business leaders to support the GLBT Historical Society's efforts to develop a new LGBTQ museum and public history center in the city. Supervisor Jeff Sheehy introduced the resolution, which was cosponsored by Supervisor Jane Kim. The board voted unanimously in favor of the resolution."

== Scholarly and professional interest ==
With its record of more than 35 years as an internationally recognized center for LGBTQ public-history initiatives, the GLBT Historical Society itself has increasingly attracted attention from scholars and other professionals in queer studies, sexuality studies, museum studies, library and information science, and other fields.

Among the books and reports that analyze its work are Jennifer Tyburczy's Sex Museums: The Politics and Performance of Display (2016); Museums and LGBTQ: An Analysis of How Museums and Other Exhibitors Can Highlight Lesbian, Gay, Bisexual, Transgender and Queer Perspectives (2016); Out of the Closet, Into the Archives: Researching Sexual Histories (2015), edited by Amy L. Stone and Jaime Cantrell; and Educational Programs: Innovative Practices for Archives and Special Collections (2015), edited by Kate Theimer.

A number of graduate research projects also have addressed the history and activities of the Historical Society. Doctoral dissertations include Diana Wakimoto's "Queer Community Archives in California Since 1950" (2012) and Kelly Jacob Rawson's "Archiving Transgender: Affects, Logics and the Power of Queer History" (2010). Master's theses include Renaud Chantraine's "La Patrimonialisation des traces des minorités sexuelles: étude de cas" (2014), Amanda Kreklau's "Collections Conundrums: Considering the First Major GLBT Museum" (2009) and Sue Weller's "Homeworks Art Museum" (2003).

In addition, numerous articles about the society have been published in peer-reviewed scholarly journals; these include Martin Meeker's "Archives Review: The Gay and Lesbian Historical Society of Northern California"; Don Romesburg's "Presenting the Queer Past: A Case for the GLBT History Museum"; and Gerard Koskovich's "Displaying the Queer Past: Purposes, Publics and Possibilities at the GLBT History Museum."

== Associated projects ==
To expand public access to its archival holdings and historical programs, the GLBT Historical Society has sponsored a number of associated projects:

- In 1991, in partnership with the University of California, Berkeley, the society published a microfilm edition of a broad selection of scarce newsletters, magazines and newspapers from its periodicals collection.
- In 1999, the society launched an annual series of exhibitions known as "Making a Case for Community History." Under the guidance of exhibitions coordinator Paul Gabriel, the project brought together advisory groups from diverse LGBTQ communities and organizations in San Francisco to curate historical displays sponsored by the society in a variety of public spaces during San Francisco Pride celebrations in June. The first "Making a Case" exhibition was shown in the mezzanine of the Castro Theatre during the International LGBT Film Festival (Frameline) in the last two weeks of June 1999, then in a tent pavilion on the lawn in front of City Hall in San Francisco Civic Center on the Saturday and Sunday of the Pride festival. The exhibition included separate cases representing Asian Americans and Pacific Islanders; African Americans; Latinos/as; bears; the transgender community; and the leather subculture and SM community. Subsequent "Making a Case" exhibitions were mounted in 2000 and 2001.
- In 2004 and 2005, further microfilm editions of the society's periodicals holdings were published by Primary Source Media, an imprint of the Gale educational publishing house.
- In 2006, the society created its own YouTube channel for the purpose of disseminating film and video from its holdings, as well as videos of its historical programs. Among the materials posted are films from the Harold O'Neal collection of home movies documenting Bay Area gay life from the late 1930s through the mid-1980s.
- In 2008, the society established a regularly updated page on Facebook. More than 34,400 people had liked the page by December 2020.
- In 2009, the society launched an online searchable database of the obituaries and death notices that have appeared in the leading San Francisco LGBTQ weekly, the Bay Area Reporter, starting with the first such article published in the newspaper in 1972; many of the obituaries reflect the catastrophic toll of the AIDS epidemic in San Francisco from the early 1980s through the late 1990s. The society regularly updates the site to include newly published obituaries from the BAR; as of January 2016, the database included more than 11,000 listings.
- In 2010, the society launched a project to create and post online digital files from its holdings of recorded sound; dubbed the "Gayback Machine", the initiative debuted with recordings of more than 250 hours of content from weekly Bay Area gay radio programs produced by journalist Randy Alfred from 1973 to 1984.
- In November 2013, the society launched a historic preservation project funded by the Historic Preservation Fund Committee of the City and County of San Francisco to document sites associated with gay, lesbian, bisexual and transgender history in San Francisco. The project was completed in 2015 with production of a nearly 400-page report, "Citywide Historic Context Statement for LGBTQ History in San Francisco," authored by Donna J. Graves and Shayne E. Watson. The San Francisco Historic Preservation Commission voted to approve the document as a formally recognized historic context statement at its meeting on Nov. 18, 2015.
- In 2016, academic publisher Gale Cengage produced a digital edition of selected archival and periodical holdings from the archives of the GLBT Historical Society. The content is offered via subscription to university and public libraries.
- In June 2017, the society launched the San Francisco ACT UP Oral History project "to chronicle, preserve and share the history of ACT UP/San Francisco and other AIDS direct-action groups in the city." Funded by California Humanities, an agency of the State of California, the project collected oral histories with veterans of ACT UP/San Francisco and other local AIDS activist groups to be permanently archived by the GLBT Historical Society. Founded and directed by public historian Joey Plaster and subsequently directed by Eric Sneathen, the project was completed in 2020 with 23 in-depth video oral histories posted free online.
- In January 2018, the GLBT Historical Society publicly launched its online archive of back issues of the Bay Area Reporter, an LGBTQ newspaper published weekly in San Francisco since 1971. The society holds the most complete run of the periodical. With funding from the Bob Ross Foundation, it digitized the full contents from 1971 through 2005 and made them available free online.

== Awards, honors and media recognition ==
The GLBT Historical Society — and since 2011, its GLBT Historical Society Museum — have received numerous awards and honors. Following is a small sample:

- The GLBT Historical Society is voted "Best Local Nonprofit" in the 2010 "Best of the Bay" readers poll conducted by the San Francisco Bay Guardian, a weekly alternative newspaper published in San Francisco.
- The GLBT Historical Society is granted the 2010 Community Service Award of the Alice B. Toklas LGBTQ Democratic Club of San Francisco.
- The GLBT Historical Society and the GLBT History Museum are elected Local Organizational Grand Marshal of the 2011 San Francisco LGBT Pride Parade and Celebration (San Francisco Pride). The parade took place on June 26, 2011; Historical Society board chairs Andrew Jolivette and Amy Sueyoshi rode in a 1940 black Cadillac provided by the Freewheelers car club; approximately two dozen society and museum volunteers and supporters marched behind the car carrying a banner for the museum.
- The GLBT History Museum is honored by the editors for "Best Queer Exhibitionism" in the "City Living" section of the 2011 "Best of the Bay" issue of the San Francisco Bay Guardian: "The first of its kind in the U.S., the sleek storefront gallery may be small, but it packs a huge emotional and educational punch.... The museum's lavender arsenal has ripped the lid off the often-obscured queer past, and attracted tens of thousands of curious visitors (Britney Spears among them)."
- Lugares, a nationally distributed travel magazine in Argentina, lists The GLBT History Museum as one of its "hot spots of San Francisco" in an article posted online in July 2011.
- CNN features The GLBT History Museum in its August 2012 "Best of San Francisco" coverage, characterizing the museum as "an intimate, handcrafted experience located in San Francisco's historically gay neighborhood, The Castro."
- The San Francisco Weekly names The GLBT History Museum one of San Francisco's "Top 10 Offbeat Museums" in its Sept. 20, 2012, issue.
- HuffPost lists the GLBT Historical Society as one of "the best LGBT history archives in the U.S." in a feature posted on Oct. 23, 2012.
- The online magazine Queerty and sister site GayCities.com list The GLBT History Museum as one of "49 reasons to love San Francisco" in July 2013.
- Out Traveler magazine names The GLBT History Museum to its list of the five "best social justice museums" in the United States in July 2013.
- Qantas Spirit of Australia, the in-flight magazine of Qantas Airlines, recommends a visit to The GLBT History Museum as part of "One Perfect Day in San Francisco" in its December 2015 issue.
- San Francisco Travel includes the GLBT History Museum in its "ultimate super to-do list" of the top-50 San Francisco attractions published in conjunction with Super Bowl 50, held in the Bay Area in February 2016.
- GZone Magazine, the first LGBTQ magazine launched in Turkey, names the GLBT History Museum one of the "best LGBT-themed museums in the world" in its March 2016 issue.
- SFist (the San Francisco edition of the international online media firm Gothamist) declares the GLBT History Museum one of the "10 coolest niche museums in San Francisco" in a feature published on October 13, 2016.
- The GLBT Historical Society is voted "Best Nonprofit" in the 2017 "LGBTQ Best of the Bay" readers poll—also known as the Besties—conducted by the Bay Area Reporter, a long-running weekly LGBTQ newspaper published in San Francisco.
- In a June 2017 online feature, Time Out names the GLBT History Museum one of the 13 "best San Francisco museums," acknowledging the institution for its role "as a home for collecting, preserving and telling the story of the struggles and achievements of the gay, lesbian, bisexual and transgender community."
- In December 2020, the San Francisco online culture magazine The Bold Italic names "50 Years of Pride," an exhibition of historic photographs by the GLBT Historical Society Museum, as "the Bay's best virtual art exhibit in 2020."

== See also ==
- Timeline of LGBTQ history
- LGBTQ culture in San Francisco
- IHLIA LGBTI Heritage in Amsterdam, the Netherlands
