= Stu Maddux =

American film director

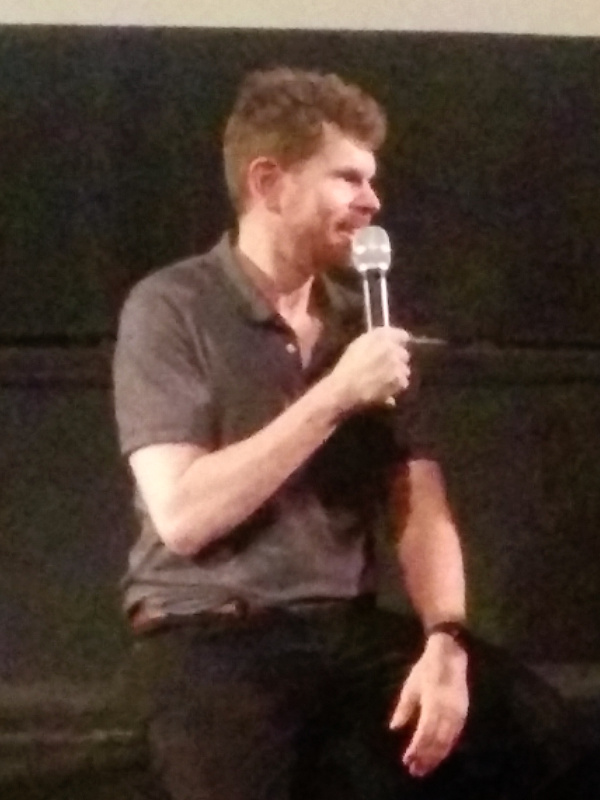
- Maddux in August 2017
- Born: 1965 (age 60–61); Montgomery, Alabama
- Education: Bachelor's degree in journalism
- Alma mater: University of Missouri
- Occupation: Independent filmmaker
- Notable work: Gen Silent; Reel in the Closet
- Website: Official website

Stu Maddux (born 1965) is an American freelance writer, editor, and cinematographer. He is a movie producer and director of his own non-fiction independent films. He is best known for his work Gen Silent, a documentary about gay, lesbian, bisexual and transgender older people who hide their sexuality or gender change in order to survive in the long-term care system. He also wrote and produced the films Bob and Jack's 52-Year Adventure and Trip to Hell and Back. His work has been featured internationally on television including on Showtime, TLC, and the BBC.

Maddux is also the founder of Interrobang Productions which is the company that he uses to produce and distribute his independent films.

== Early life and education ==
Maddux was born during the height of the Civil rights movement in Montgomery, Alabama, Alabama. His father worked for a large corporation and relocated the family frequently as his career advanced. Throughout his childhood, he lived in Seattle, Washington, Denver, Colorado, Minneapolis, Minnesota, and Kansas City, Missouri.

His family moved to Kansas City, Missouri where he first discovered his passion for film and television by organizing his high school friends into a production company that created public access programs. Maddux attended the University of Missouri where he earned a bachelor's degree in journalism.

== Filmography ==
=== Bob and Jack's 52-Year Adventure ===
Bob and Jack's 52-Year Adventure is a self-narrated documentary about a United States Army sergeant who was courted by his commanding officer in 1952 post-World War II Germany. Other troops became aware of their relationship and the two men confronted the troops in their unit in order to avoid being court-martialed.

The documentary features Sergeant Bob Claunch and Lieutenant Jack Reavley as they look back on their previous fifty two years. In the documentary, they talk about the challenges with keeping their relationship intact, the issues that they face while growing old in a gay relationship, and the need for equal rights as an older gay couple.

=== Trip to Hell and Back ===
Trip to Hell and Back is the true story of Trip Harting, a famous horse rider who lived a double life as a crystal-methamphetamine dealer in the Washington DC's gay drug scene. Harting was one of the top Dressage riders in the United States and also had a shot at the Olympics; however, he was also one of the largest meth dealers in Washington DC until he was arrested by DEA agents. In the documentary, Harting reveals the story of his double life for the first time.

In 2008, Harting was diagnosed with a rare form of cancer and died just a few weeks after the film's premiere. The documentary was screened at many notable film festivals including the Tiburon International Film Festival and the Tallahassee Film Festival.

=== Gen Silent ===
Gen Silent is a documentary about gay, lesbian, bisexual, and transgender older people who face discrimination in long-term care because of their sexual identity or non-normative gender preference. The documentary was filmed over a year in Boston, Massachusetts and documents the challenges faced by the six gay seniors whose sexuality or gender change causes them to be isolated and not receive the same long-term care as elderly heterosexual individuals. The documentary debuted in February 2010 at the Boston LGBT Film Festival.

The film became critically acclaimed and received positive reviews from numerous media outlets including the Chicago Sun-Times which called it "one of the most important LGBT documentaries to come out this year." Excerpts from Gen Silent were used for the public television program In the Life and the film also received positive reviews from The Huffington Post. The film has also become a leading tool worldwide for raising awareness about LGBTQ aging.

=== Reel in the Closet ===
Maddux's documentary film Reel in the Closet (2015) features LGBTQ home movie and video footage, and stresses the importance of finding, restoring, and preserving this aspect of LGBT history. The film had its world premiere at the Frameline Film Festival on 21 June 2015. It is currently used in curricula across the United States.

=== Queer Ghost Hunters ===
Queer Ghost Hunters (2016) is his ongoing web series about finding LGBTQ history through a team of paranormal investigators who search for LGBTQ entities.

=== Minister of Loneliness (Working Title) ===
Minister of Loneliness (in production) (2020) is a multi-media project (film, web, app, installation) delving into causes behind a reported worldwide epidemic in loneliness, the societal and health ramifications, and the solutions currently being implemented by governments. The film and a virtual reality installation are told through the eyes of a handful of people overcoming chronic loneliness after being debilitated by it.

== The Clowder Group ==
The Clowder Group is the production company founded and used by Maddux and his husband, Joseph Applebaum, to produce and distribute their independent films. The company was founded in 1996 and is headquartered in San Francisco, California.

== Activism ==
Maddux is an outspoken activist for the LGBTQ aging and LGBTQ history. He has spoken at national conferences including the American Psychological Association, Out & Equal, Creating Change and the American Society on Aging. He has frequently advocated for residential communities and care facilities to form their own gay-straight alliances similar to those in high schools. In 2018, he and his husband began a campaign to remove the stigma of identifying as lonely.

=== Awards ===
Year	Film title	Award name	Organization
2010	Gen Silent	Audience Award for Best Documentary	Sacramento Film and Music Festival
2010	Gen Silent	Jury Award for Best Documentary	Sacramento Film and Music Festival
2011	Gen Silent	Alternative Spirit Award	Rhode Island International Film Festival
2011	Gen Silent	Audience Choice for Best Documentary	Frameline Film Festival
2011	Gen Silent	Audience Award for Best Documentary	Connecticut Gay & Lesbian Film Festival
2010	Gen Silent	Audience Award for Best Documentary	Charlotte Film Festival
