= List of transgender publications =

This list of transgender publications includes books, magazines, and academic journals about transgender people, culture, and thought.

== Books ==
Some publishers of transgender-related books include Trans-Genre Press, Topside Press, and Transgress Press.

=== Non-fiction ===
Work	Year	Author	Notes	References
Transidentity	2022	Hans-Werner Gessmann/Vishal Lohchab	ISBN 978-3-928524-82-7	
ACT For Gender Identity: The Comprehensive Guide	2020	Alex Stitt	ISBN 978-1785927997	
American Teenager	2024	Nico Lang	ISBN 978-1-419-77382-2	
Footprints of a Queer History: Life Stories from Gujarat	2022	Maya Sharma	2023 Rainbow Award for Nonfiction Winner ISBN 978-9-382-57935-9	
Gender Outlaw: On Men, Women and the Rest of Us	1994	Kate Bornstein	ISBN 0-679-75701-5	
Hijab Butch Blues	2023	Lamya H	ISBN 978-0-593-44878-6	
Histories of the Transgender Child	2018	Jules Gill-Peterson	Won 2019 Lambda Literary Award for Transgender Nonfiction ISBN 978-1-517-90466-1	
Mom, I Need to Be a Girl	1998	Just Evelyn	Memoir from the point of view of the mother. ISBN 0-9663272-0-9	
X Marks The Spot: An Anthology Of Nonbinary Experiences	2019	Theo Hendrie (editor)	Essays and poetry from nonbinary people for nonbinary people. ISBN 1-0809680-3-2	
Normal Life: Administrative Violence, Critical Trans Politics and the Limits of Law	2011	Dean Spade	Nominated for a 2011 Lambda Literary Award. ISBN 0-89608-796-4	
Raising Ryland	2015	Hillary Whittington	ISBN 978-0-06-23888-96	
Redefining Realness	2014	Janet Mock	Memoir ISBN 978-1476709123	
Third Sex and Human Rights	1999	Rajesh Talwar	ISBN 81-212-0642-1	
Trans History: From Ancient Times to the Present Day	2025	Alex L. Combs, Andrew Eakett	Graphic novel anthology ISBN 9781536219234	
Trans Liberation: Beyond Pink or Blue	1999	Leslie Feinberg	ISBN 0-8070-7951-0	
Trans/Rad/Fem	2025	Talia Bhatt	ISBN 9798306921891	
Transecology: Transgender Perspectives on Environment and Nature	2021	Douglas A. Vakoch (editor)	ISBN 9780367086510	
Transgender History	2008	Susan Stryker	ISBN 978-1-58005-224-5	
Transgender India: Understanding Third Gender Identities and Experiences	2022	Douglas A. Vakoch (editor)	ISBN 978-3-030-96385-9	
The Routledge Handbook of Trans Literature	2024	Douglas A. Vakoch and Sabine Sharp (editors)	ISBN 9781032431550	
Transgender Liberation: A Movement Whose Time Has Come	1992	Leslie Feinberg	ISBN 0-89567-105-0	
Transgender Rights	2006	Paisley Currah, Richard M. Juang, and Shannon Minter (editors)	ISBN 0-8166-4311-3	
Transgender Warriors: Making History from Joan of Arc to Dennis Rodman	1996	Leslie Feinberg	ISBN 0-8070-7941-3	
The Truth about Me: A Hijra Life Story	2009	A. Revathi	First book on Hijra by a Hijra. ISBN 978-81-8475-271-7	
When Kayla Was Kyle	2013	Amy Fabrikant	ISBN 978-1-61286-154-8	
Lou Sullivan: Daring to be a Man Among Men	2017	Brice Smith	ISBN 978-0-99825-211-7	
Becoming Eve: My Journey from Ultra-Orthodox Rabbi to Transgender Woman	2019	Abby Stein	First book by Hasidic trans person. ISBN 978-1-58005-916-9	
Amateur	2018	Thomas Page McBee	ISBN 9781501168741	
Man Alive	2014	Thomas Page McBee	ISBN 9780872866249	
Please Miss: A Heartbreaking Work of Staggering Penis	2022	Grace Elisabeth Lavery	ISBN 9781541620650	
The Last Time I Wore a Dress	1997	Dylan Scholinski and Jane Meredith Adams	1998 Lambda Literary Award Winner ISBN 978-1573220774	
The Empress Is a Man	1998	Michael R. Gorman	1999 Lambda Literary Award Winner ISBN 9781560239178	
Omnigender: A Trans-religious Approach	2001	Virginia Ramey Mollenkott	2002 Lambda Literary Award Winner ISBN 9780829814224	
Dress Codes	2002	Noelle Howey	Memoir 2003 Lambda Literary Winner Award ISBN 9780312422202	
The Gender Frontier	2004	Mariette Pathy Allen	2005 Lambda Literary Award Winner ISBN 9783936636048	
The Transgender Studies Reader	2006	Susan Stryker and Stephen Whittle (editors)	2007 Lambda Literary Award Winner ISBN 9780415947091	
Transparent	2007	Cris Beam	2008 Lambda Literary Award Winner ISBN 9780156033770	
Lynnee Breedlove's One Freak Show	2009	Lynn Breedlove	2012 Lambda Literary Award Winner ISBN 9781933149325	
Balancing on the Mechitza: Transgender in Jewish Community	2010	Noach Dzmura (editor)	2011 Lambda Literary Award Winner ISBN 9781556438134	
Tango: My Childhood, Backwards and in High Heels	2012	Justin Vivian Bond	Memoir. 2013 Lambda Literary Award Winner ISBN 9781558617476	
Transfeminist Perspectives in and beyond Transgender and Gender Studies	2012	Anne Enke (editor)	2013 Lambda Literary Award Winner ISBN 9781439907474	

=== Fiction and poetry ===
Work	Year	Author	Genre	Description and ISBN	References
10,000 Dresses	2008	Marcus Ewert	Young adult/Children's	Picture book about a young transgender girl named Bailey whose family does not agree with her desire to wear dresses. ISBN 1-58322-850-0	
An Anglo-American Alliance	1906	Gregory Casparian	Science fiction novel		
The Adventures of Tulip, Birthday Wish Fairy	2012	S. Bear Bergman and Suzy Malik	Young adult/Children's	Title character Tulip receives a birthday wish from a child known as David who wishes to live as Daniela, and learns how to help and respect a gender-independent young person. 2013 Lambda Literary Award Finalist. ISBN 978-0-9879763-0-7	
Almost Perfect	2009	Brian Katcher	Young adult/Children's	Story of an adolescent transgender girl named Sage Hendrix who moves to a new high school in Missouri. 2011 Stonewall Book Award from the American Library Association.	
Beatrice the Sixteenth	1909	Irene Clyde	Utopian/science fiction novel	A time traveller discovers a lost world, which contains a postgender society.	
Beautiful Music for Ugly Children	2012	Kirstin Cronn-Mills	Young adult/Children's	Despite bullying from his classmates and a lack of acknowledgement from his family, music geek Gabe (born Elizabeth) is transitioning, and just wants to make it through his nearing graduation. Stonewall Book Award winner and a Lambda Literary Award finalist.	
Being Emily	2012	Rachel Gold	Young adult/Children's	Emily (born Christopher) begins to come out as transgender during her junior year of high school.	
Bellies	2023	Nicola Dinan	Fiction	2024 Polari First Book Prize Winner ISBN 1-335-49088-4	
Breakfast on Pluto	1998	Patrick McCabe	Fiction	Patrick "Pussy" Braden is an Irish trans woman who escapes from the fictional Irish town of Tyreelin and a drunk foster mother, to find herself and the biological mother who gave her away. Booker Prize shortlist.	
The Butterfly and the Flame	2005	Dana De Young	Fiction		
Blond(e) Boy, Red Lipstick	2018	Geoff Bunn	Fiction	A cis man revisits a love affair he had in the 1980s with a transfeminine boy.	
Body Alchemy	1996	Loren Cameron	Fiction	1997 Lambda Literary Award Winner ISBN 978-1-57344-062-2	
Bye-Bye, Black Sheep: A Mommy-track Mystery	2006	Ayelet Waldman	Mystery	Part of a series featuring Juliet Appelbaum, a stay-at-home mom and former public defender. In this installment, Appelbaum is approached by Heavenly, a transsexual woman who asks her to investigate the murder of her sister, Violetta, a prostitute and drug addict. ISBN 0-425-21018-9	
Choir Boy	2005	Charlie Jane Anders	Young adult/Children's	A coming of age story of twelve-year-old Berry, a boy who seeks out antiandrogens in order to suppress his testosterone and prevent voice change from affecting his ability to sing in the choir. The novel won the Lambda Literary Award in the Transgender/Genderqueer category. ISBN 1-932360-81-6	
Cereus Blooms at Night: A Novel	1999	Shani Mootoo	Fiction	A multi-narrative novel set in a fictional island in the Caribbean. An ambiguously gendered, but often presumed male, nurse named Tyler tells the troubled family history of Mala Ramchandin, an elderly woman under her care at a nursing home. Ze also relates the story of the transgender man named Otoh, who becomes Tyler's boyfriend. Shani Mootoo's novel explores identity, gender and community. ISBN 978-0-380-73199-2	
The Collection: Short Fiction from the Transgender Vanguard	2012	Tom Léger and Riley MacLeod (editors)	Fiction	ISBN 0-9832422-0-8	
The Danish Girl	2000	David Ebershoff	Fiction	A fictionalized account of the life of Lili Elbe, the first person to undergo sex reassignment surgery. ISBN 978-0-14-310839-9	
Detransition, Baby	2021	Torrey Peters	Fiction	ISBN 978-0-593-13337-8	
Didn't Nobody Give a Shit What Happened to Carlotta	2022	James Hannaham	Fiction	A trans woman returns home after spending 22 years in a men's prison. ISBN 978-1-78770-421-3	
Freakboy	2013	Kristin Elizabeth Clark	Young adult/Children's	ISBN 0-374-32472-7	
The Gender Fairy	2015	Jo Hirst	Children's picture book	ISBN 9780994457004	
Girlfriends	2023	Emily Zhou	Short stories	2024 Leslie Feinberg Award winner ISBN 9781736716847	
Holding Still for as Long as Possible	2009	Zoe Whittall	Fiction	Josh is a trans man with a girlfriend, Amy. 2011 Lambda Literary Award Winner ISBN 9781770898073	
I Am J	2011	Cris Beam	Fiction	ISBN 0-316-05361-9	
I Am Jazz	2014	Jazz Jennings & Jessica Herthel	Young adult/Children's	ISBN 0-8037-4107-3	
Just Girls	2014	Rachel Gold	Young adult/Children's	ISBN 1-59493-419-3	
Kafka on the Shore	2002	Haruki Murakami	General	Features a gay, transgender man named Oshima who is friends with the main character. ISBN 1-84343-110-6	
Luna	2004	Julie Anne Peters	Young adult/Children's	Story of Luna O'Neill (born Liam), a young male-to-female transsexual. Lambda Literary Award finalist in the Children's/Young Adult category. ISBN 0-316-73369-5	
Maxine Wore Black	2014	Nora Olsen	Fiction		
An Unexpected Turn	2021	Brianna Nicole Austin	Fiction	A coming-of-age male-to-female story about a 12-year-old boy that gets caught by his mother cross-dressing. Her desperate attempt to hide the secret from her friends sets off in motion a series of events that will change their lives forever. Sometimes humorous and light, the novela delves into being a transgender girl from the perspective of both the young boy, Stephanie, his mother, and Dr. Dorothy, Stephanie's best friend,	
Mezcalero	2015 2017	T.E. Wilson	Fiction	First novel in the Detective Sánchez series, featuring the Mexican-Canadian transgender protagonist Ernesto Sánchez	
My Princess Boy	2009	Cheryl Kilodavis and Suzanne DeSimone	Young adult/Children's	Picture book about the author's son Dyson, whose self-expression does not conform to stereotypical gender role as Dyson prefers clothing meant for girls.	
Myra Breckinridge	1968	Gore Vidal	Fiction	Myra is a beautiful young woman with a secret agenda — and a secret past as a man named Myron.	
Nevada: A Novel	2013	Imogen Binnie	Fiction	Punk New York City trans woman Maria Griffith goes on a road trip to Nevada while reflecting on gender and queer politics. 2014 Lambda Literary Award finalist. ISBN 0-9832422-9-1	
Orlando: A Biography	1928	Virginia Woolf	Fiction	Story of Orlando, an individual assigned male at birth who was born in England during the reign of Elizabeth I. Orlando lives for more than 300 years and, at around 30 years of age, mysteriously changes sex to female.	
Parrotfish	2011	Ellen Wittlinger	Young adult/Children's	Coming out story of a transgender teenage boy named Grady; the title refers to the fact that parrotfish can change their gender.	
Roving Pack	2012	Sassafras Lowrey	Young adult/Children's	Story of a group of independent youths in the Portland, Oregon area trying to find their way.	
Run, Clarissa, Run	2012	Rachel Eliason	Fiction		
A Safe Girl to Love	2014	Casey Plett	Fiction	Won 2015 Lambda Literary Award for Transgender Fiction	
Sacred Country	1992	Rose Tremain	Fiction	A novel about Mary Ward, who at the age of six decides she should have been born a boy. The novel concerns her struggle in a small town in England. ISBN 1-85619-118-4	
She's Not There	2003	Jennifer Finney Boylan	Fiction	2004 Lambda Literary Award Winner ISBN 9780385346979	
Stone Butch Blues	1993	Leslie Feinberg	Fiction	Butch Jess Goldberg grows up in the pre-Stonewall era. Won the Lambda Literary Award and the 1994 American Library Association Gay & Lesbian Book Award. ISBN 1-56341-030-3	
The Ice Princess	2011	Emmy Morgan	Fiction	Black trans woman struggles through her past to become a daytime soap opera star. This is the first book in a trilogy.	
The Ship We Built	2020	Lexie Bean	Middle grade/Children's	10-year-old trans boy Rowan doesn't have the words yet to describe how he feels. He doesn't fit in with the boys or the girls, he faces sexual abuse from his father, and his mother ignores him. He finds an outlet in writing letters and attaching them to balloons. Deals with gender, coming of age, bullying, abuse, and racism.	
Summer Fun	2021	Jeanne Thornton	Fiction	Won 2022 Lambda Literary Award for Transgender Fiction ISBN 978-1641292382	
Take Me There: Trans and Genderqueer Erotica	2011	Tristan Taormino (editor)	Fiction	2012 Lambda Literary Award Winner ISBN 9781573447201	
The Thirty Names of Night	2020	Zeyn Joukhadar	Fiction	2021 Stonewall Book Award Winner ISBN 978-1-9821-2149-5	
Trans-Sister Radio	2000	Chris Bohjalian	Fiction		
Troubling the Line: Trans and Genderqueer Poetry and Poetics	2013	T.C. Tolbert & Trace Peterson (editors)	Poetry	ISBN 1-937658-10-4	
Trumpet	1999	Jackie Kay	Fiction	2000 Lambda Literary Award Winner ISBN 9780375704635	
When the Harvest Comes	2025	Denne Michele Norris	Fiction	ISBN 978-0593729601	
Wild Dogs of Mexico	2018	T.E. Wilson	Fiction	Second novel in the Detective Sánchez series, featuring the Mexican-Canadian transgender protagonist Ernesto Sánchez	
Woodworking	2025	Emily St. James	Fiction	ISBN 9781638931478	

== Magazines and periodicals ==
Title	Editor(s)	Publisher	First published	Ceased publication	Frequency	ISSN	Notes
Chrysalis: The journal of transgressive gender identities		American Educational Gender Information Service	1991	1998	Quarterly	ISSN 1086-4873	
FTM Magazine	Jason Robert Ballard		2014	-	Quarterly	ISSN 2377-7737	"The GQ for Trans Men"
Frock Magazine	Katie Glover, Sally Bend	The Gender Society	2009	2017	Bimonthly		Magazine containing "transgender-related articles, features and stories which will be of interest to transsexuals, crossdressers, drag queens and transvestites and intersexed people"
gendertrash from hell	Mirha-Soleil Ross, Xanthra Phillippa MacKay	genderpress	1993	1995			Founded for "gender queers" to discuss "our concerns in/around/about gender"
Original Plumbing	Amos Mac, Rocco Kayiatos		2009		Quarterly	ISSN 2153-6341	"Dedicated to the culture and lifestyle of transgender men"
TG Life	Brianna Austin	Inicia Incorporated	2004	-			"An online magazine, social network and resource center for, by, and about the transgender community."
Brianna Austin	Brianna Austin	Inicia Incorporated	2000	-			"An online resource for articles, essays, poetry and true stories by Brianna Nicole Austin."
Transgender Tapestry	Dallas Denny	International Foundation for Gender Education	1985	2006	Quarterly	ISSN 0884-9749	Formerly known as Tapestry
Transsexual News Telegraph	Gail Sondegaard		1991	2002	Quarterly	ISSN 1091-1138	
Reflections International: The TV & TS Magazine		TransEssex	1995	1999		ISSN 1357-2644	
TSQ: Transgender Studies Quarterly	Paisley Currah, Susan Stryker	Duke University Press	2014		Quarterly	ISSN 2328-9252, ISSN 2328-9260	
Transformation Magazine	Hanna Rodgers	Transformation Publishing Inc.	1969		Quarterly	OCLC 34616263	Magazine of interest to transgender, transsexual, crossdresser, intersex, gender fluid, gender non-conformist readers
TransSisters: The Journal of Transsexual Feminism	Davina Anne Gabriel		1993	1995?	Quarterly		Feminism, trans activism, trans women
Narcissus: Tv/ts Magazine		New TransEssex	1989	1992?	semiannually	OCLC 51182668	
Transvestia	Virginia Prince	Chevalier Publications	1960	1986	Bimonthly	OCLC 10363080	
Transvestia: The Journal of the American Society for Equality in Dress	Virginia Prince	Virginia Prince	1952	1952	two issues (mimeographed)	OCLC 952387167	First transgender publication in U.S. history
Das 3. Geschlecht - Die Transvestiten (The Third Sex)	Various	Friedrich Radszuweit	1930	1933	Biannually	ISSN 1619-9820 (German language reprint)	"A German magagazine featuring stories and advice columns written by cis and trans authors for trans readers. English translation available at The Weimar Project"
#EnbyLife: Journal for non-binary & gender diverse creatives	Rae White, Alison Evans	Rae White	2016		once in 2016, approximately weekly from 2019		"In a world where diverse and marginalised voices are so often not heard, considered or understood, #EnbyLife journal will showcase the creative works of non-binary and gender diverse creatives, and pay them for their work."
Urania	Eva Gore-Booth, Esther Roper, Irene Clyde, Dorothy Cornish and Jessey Wade	Privately published by D. R. Mitra, Manoranjan Press	1916	1940	Bimonthly, then triannually	OCLC 269259351	"The unifying legacy of Urania challenges the idea that trans and non-binary identities are something novel, and shows the longstanding interconnections and solidarities between feminism, trans rights and sapphic lives."
Girl Talk Magazine	Gina Lance, Bijoux Deluxe, Ivy D Vine, DeLux,	Rachel White, GTM Publications	1997	2005	Bimonthly	ISSN: 15245594OCLC:41104489	Enjoying the fun of the Transgender lifestyle

== Academic journals ==
- Bulletin of Applied Transgender Studies (2021–present)
- International Journal of Transgender Health (1998–present)
- Transgender Health (2016–present)
- Transgender Studies Quarterly (2014–present)

== See also ==
- List of transgender-related topics
- List of transgender-rights organizations
- List of fictional trans characters
- List of transgender people
- Literature about intersex
- Zenith Foundation Publications
