= Transgender studies =

Academic discipline

Transgender studies, also called trans studies or trans* studies, is an interdisciplinary field of academic research dedicated to the study of gender identity, gender expression, and gender embodiment, as well as to the study of various issues of relevance to transgender and gender variant populations. Interdisciplinary subfields of transgender studies include applied transgender studies, transgender history, transgender literature, transgender media studies, transgender anthropology and archaeology, transgender psychology, and transgender health. The research theories within transgender studies focus on cultural presentations, political movements, social organizations and the lived experience of various forms of gender nonconformity. The discipline emerged in the early 1990s in close connection to queer theory. By the 2020s, transgender studies was sufficiently developed to support academic book series devoted specifically to transgender and nonbinary topics. Non-transgender-identified peoples are often also included under the "trans" umbrella for transgender studies, such as intersex people, crossdressers, drag artists, third gender individuals, and genderqueer people.

Transgender studies provides responses to negative points of views about transgender people. Those negative misconceptions could be the narrow and inaccurate transgender state in psychology and medicine, etc. The ultimate goal of transgender studies is to provide knowledge that will benefit transgender people and communities.

== History ==
In response to critiques of how transgender issues were represented in gender and gay and lesbian studies, the late 1990s saw an increase in transgender scholarship and the emergence of a specific discipline of academic study. Sandy Stone is a transgender woman whose 1987 essay "The Empire Strikes Back: A Posttranssexual Manifesto," published in response to the anti-transsexual book The Transsexual Empire: The Making of the She-Male, has been cited as the origin of transgender studies. At times a contested field, scholars in transgender studies argue that what positions transgender studies as a unique discipline is the way trans bodies are centered epistemologically in the discipline.

In 2016, through the Tawani Foundation, Jennifer Pritzker gave a donation of 2 million US$ to create the world's first endowed academic Chair in Transgender Studies, at the University of Victoria in British Columbia. Aaron Devor was chosen as the inaugural chair.

== Notable works ==
Notable works dealing with transgender issues sometimes bridge the space between memoir, creative piece and critical work. Transgender fiction and non-fiction are often informed by the personal experiences of the authors and various transgender authors have written pieces important for the field of trans studies that were not strictly speaking critical scholarship. Some of these works include Whipping Girl: A Transsexual Woman on Sexism and the Scapegoating of Femininity by Julia Serano (about the experience of and sexist basis for transmisogyny), Stone Butch Blues by Leslie Feinberg (a novel about the complicated overlaps and tensions between butch lesbian and trans masculine identities and communities) Janet Mock's Redefining Realness: My Path to Womanhood, Identity, Love & So Much More (a memoir detailing Mock's experience growing up within intersecting marginalized race, class and gender categories) and Gender Blending: Confronting the Limits of Duality, by Aaron Devor (1989). The book explores "gender blending," and the ways in which people challenge traditional gender norms. Using more current language, this book could be considered an exploration of non-binary identities.

Other important transgender studies texts are more firmly theoretical or critical. Judith Butler, whose work is important for queer studies more broadly, was influential in the field of transgender studies specifically for the formulation of the theory of gender performativity that is the basis for genderqueer activism and theorization. Jack Halberstam is another key figure in transgender studies. Halberstam's work deals with female masculinity, the concept of "queer failure" and various theorizations of trans or gender variant embodiment and temporality. Paul B. Preciado's Testo Junkie: Sex, Drugs, and Biopolitics in the Pharmacopornographic Era is considered autotheory and intertwines personal and cultural histories of clinical hormone therapies with political histories of hormonal birth control, and performance enhancing testosterone use. The Routledge Handbook of Trans Literature, published in 2024, explores these and other works in trans theory and literature, offering "a comprehensive overview of trans literature, highlighting the core topics, genres, and periods important for scholarship now and in the future."

In recent years, scholarly book series devoted to transgender studies have been launched. Duke University Press publishes ASTERISK: Gender, Trans-, and All That Comes After, which "takes transgender studies beyond transgender—and beyond gender—as its privileged object of analysis" and "puts transgender into conversation with whatever can come after trans-." Bloomsbury Publishing's book series Trans Studies "is based on a three-fold commitment to: 1. Provide inclusive, global representation of transgender and nonbinary topics and authors, 2. Challenge assumptions of trans studies and other fields, and 3. Engage diverse disciplines from the humanities, social sciences, and biological sciences."

Academic journals devoted to transgender studies began with the International Journal of Transgender Health, which published its first issue in 1997. The next year saw the publication of a special issue of Gay and Lesbian Quarterly (GLQ) on transgender topics. Invisible Lives: The Erasure of Transsexual and Transgendered People by Viviane K. Namaste was published in 2000 and was "the first scholarly study of transgendered people." Transgender Studies Quarterly (TSQ), the first non-medical academic journal devoted to transgender issues, began publication in 2014 with Susan Stryker and Paisley Currah as coeditors. The first issue, "Postposttranssexual: Key Concepts for a Twenty-First-Century Transgender Studies", was a book-length double issue with over 85 short essays on various keywords related to the growing field of transgender studies. Some essays took key terms from other fields (such as "Capital", "Queer", "Disability", and "Postmodernism") and teased out the connections to transgender activist and academic thought. Other essays took words understood as important for transgender studies and discussed their theoretical histories and potential future paths ("Becoming", "Cisgender", "Identity", "Transition", and others). Since 2014, TSQ has had issues devoted to, among other topics: Archives and Archiving, Trans/Feminisms, Transpsychoanalytics, Blackness, and Sport Studies. On August 2, 2021, the Center for Applied Transgender Studies announced the launch of its flagship publication, the platinum open access peer-reviewed academic journal Bulletin of Applied Transgender Studies, published by Northwestern University Libraries. The Bulletin is the first open access journal dedicated to transgender studies and the first journal dedicated to empirical research on transgender social, cultural, and political issues.

Recently books have been published on the important intersection of race, nationalism and transgender identity including Susan Faludi's memoir "In The Dark Room" about her Hungarian Jewish father's transition at the age of 76 and C. Riley Snorton's Black on Both Sides which explains the co-constitutive histories of blackness/anti-blackness and transness/transphobia in America from the 19th century onward. Columbia University Press published, in February 2019, "the first introductory textbook intended for transgender/trans studies at the undergraduate level" by Ardel Haefele-Thomas.

=== Applied transgender studies ===
Recent scholarship in transgender studies has pushed against the field's primary emphasis on humanistic inquiry, instead centering scholarship that empirically investigates issues of social, cultural, and political significance to transgender and gender minority people globally. This emergent subfield of "applied transgender studies" conceives of itself as "an interdisciplinary endeavor to identify, analyze, and, ultimately, improve the material conditions transgender people face in daily life." The Center for Applied Transgender Studies in Chicago, Illinois has been the primary driver of the turn to applied transgender studies and it publishes the only academic journal dedicated to the area of study, the Bulletin of Applied Transgender Studies.

== Teaching transgender studies ==
Sara E. Cooper (Professor of Spanish and Women Studies) applied for a teaching position at California State University at Chico and she received the job, in spite of her focus on Spanish studies. She writes a journal article that highlights the ridicule she sometimes received during her public speeches, but insists on educating her peers "as a matter of personal safety and respect". Cooper brings up how the LGBTQ community is not as supportive towards certain categories in their community as some of her students are led to believe and while she faced a few challenges in her career, she concludes that teaching Transgender Studies was ultimately life-changing.

Cooper's specialization was initially Women Studies, and from there, she was granted the authority over a course that is exclusive to the LGBTQ community. This mirrors the placement of Transgender Studies within the school curriculum. In Women Studies classes, transgender issues are sometimes taught as an extension of women's issues, and are rarely given attention on their own.

Susan Stryker's anthology The Transgender Studies Reader (2006) was awarded the Lambda Literary Award in the transgender category.

In 2016, Aaron Devor was appointed the inaugural chair for the Chair in Transgender Studies at the University of Victoria, in Canada. Devor is the founder and subject matter expert of the Transgender Archives, one of world's largest collections on the history of transgender activists and research.

=== CeCe McDonald Case ===
CeCe McDonald was sent to prison after defending herself and her friends from an attacker. The attack consisted of shouting transphobic and racist terms before it took a physical turn. The issue of cisgender privilege arises when CeCe was the only one who was charged; additionally, the case can be analyzed through an intersectional lens due to the racist and cissexist nature of the attack.

== Notable figures ==
- TJ Billard, associate professor in the School of Communication and the Department of Sociology at Northwestern University, founding executive director of the Center for Applied Transgender Studies, founding editor of the Bulletin of Applied Transgender Studies, and author of Voices for Transgender Equality: Making Change in the Networked Public Sphere (Oxford University Press, 2024)
- Judith Butler, Maxine Elliot Professor in the Department of Comparative Literature and the Program of Critical Theory at the University of California, Berkeley, and author of Gender Trouble: Feminism and the Subversion of Identity (Routledge, 1990) and Bodies That Matter: On the Discursive Limits of Sex (Routledge, 1993)
- micha cárdenas, assistant professor in the Department of Performance, Play & Design at the University of California, Santa Cruz and author of Poetic Operations: Trans of Color Art in Digital Media (Duke University Press, 2022)
- Andrea Long Chu, doctoral student in the Department of Comparative Literature at New York University and author of Females (Verso, 2019)
- Paisley Currah, professor in the Department of Political Science and the Women's and Gender Studies Program at Brooklyn College and the Graduate Center of the City University of New York, co-editor of Transgender Rights (University of Minnesota Press, 2006), founding co-editor of TSQ: Transgender Studies Quarterly, and author of Sex Is as Sex Does: Governing Transgender Identity (New York University Press, 2022)
- Aaron Devor, inaugural chair for the Chair in Transgender Studies, professor in the Department of Sociology, founder and subject matter expert of the Transgender Archives at the University of Victoria, as well as historian for the World Professional Association for Transgender Health (WPATH).
- Jules Gill-Peterson, associate professor in the Department of History at Johns Hopkins University, author of Histories of the Transgender Child (University of Minnesota Press, 2018), recipient of a Lambda Literary Award for Transgender Nonfiction and the Children's Literature Association Book Award, and co-editor of TSQ: Transgender Studies Quarterly
- Jack Halberstam, professor in the Department of English and Comparative Literature and director of the Institute for Research on Women, Gender and Sexuality at Columbia University, and author of Female Masculinity (Duke University Press, 1998), In A Queer Time and Place: Transgender Bodies, Subcultural Lives (New York University Press, 2005), The Queer Art of Failure (Duke University Press, 2011), and Trans*: A Quick and Quirky Account of Gender Variance (University of California Press, 2018)
- Magnus Hirschfeld, German physician and sexologist who founded the Institut für Sexualwissenschaft, the Scientific-Humanitarian Committee, and the World League for Sexual Reform
- Chase Joynt, assistant professor in the Department of Gender Studies at the University of Victoria, co-author of You Only Live Twice: Sex, Death and Transition (Coach House Books, 2016), co-director of No Ordinary Man (2020), director of Framing Agnes (2022), and winner of the Sundance Film Festival NEXT Audience Award and NEXT Innovator Award
- Hil Malatino, assistant professor in the Department of Women's, Gender, and Sexuality Studies at Pennsylvania State University, and author of Queer Embodiment: Monstrosity, Medical Violence, and Intersex Experience (University of Nebraska Press, 2019), Trans Care (University of Minnesota Press, 2020), and Side Affects: On Being Trans and Feeling Bad (University of Minnesota Press, 2022)
- Viviane Namaste, professor in the Simone de Beauvoir Institute at Concordia University, and author of Invisible Lives: The Erasure of Transsexual and Transgendered People (University of Chicago Press, 2000) and Sex Change, Social Change: Reflections on Identity, Institutions, and Imperialism (Women's Press/Canadian Scholars' Press, 2005)
- Jay Prosser, reader in humanities in the School of English at the University of Leeds and author of Second Skins: The Body Narratives of Transsexuality (Columbia University Press, 1998)
- Trish Salah, associate professor in the Department of Gender Studies at Queen's University and winner of a Lambda Literary Award for Transgender Fiction
- C. Riley Snorton, professor in the Department of English Language and Literature and the Center for Gender and Sexuality Studies at the University of Chicago, author of Black on Both Sides: A Racial History of Trans Identity (University of Minnesota Press, 2017), and winner of a Lambda Literary Award for Transgender Nonfiction
- Dean Spade, professor in the Seattle University School of Law and author of Normal Life: Administrative Violence, Critical Trans Politics and the Limits of Law (South End Press, 2011)
- Sandy Stone, professor emerita in the Department of Radio-Television-Film at the University of Texas at Austin and author of the founding text of transgender studies, “The Empire Strikes Back: A Posttranssexual Manifesto”
- Susan Stryker, professor emerita in the Department of Gender and Women's Studies and founder of the Transgender Studies Initiative in the Institute for LGBT Studies at the University of Arizona, former executive director of the GLBT Historical Society, director of Screaming Queens: The Riot at Compton's Cafeteria (2005), author of Transgender History (Seal Press, 2008), co-editor of The Transgender Studies Reader (Routledge, 2006) and The Transgender Studies Reader 2 (Routledge 2013), founding co-editor of TSQ: Transgender Studies Quarterly, and winner of a Lambda Literary Award for Transgender Literature

== Selected bibliography ==
=== Journals ===
- Bulletin of Applied Transgender Studies (2021–present) ISSN 2769-2124.
- International Journal of Transgender Health (1998–present; until 2020, titled International Journal of Transgenderism) ISSN 1553-2739.
- Transgender Health (2016–present) ISSN 2688-4887.
- TSQ: Transgender Studies Quarterly (2014–present) ISSN 2328-9252.

=== Book series ===
- ASTERISK: Gender, Trans-, and All That Comes After. Duke University Press. Editors: Susan Stryker, Eliza Steinbock, Jian Neo Chen, Marquis Bey.
- Trans Studies. Bloomsbury Publishing. Editor: Douglas Vakoch.

=== Books ===
- Beemyn, G., & Goldberg, A. (2021). (Eds.), The SAGE encyclopedia of trans studies. SAGE. ISBN 978-1-5443-9381-0.
- Beemyn, G, & Rankin, S. (2011). The lives of transgender people. Columbia University Press. ISBN 978-0-2311-4307-3.
- Bey, M. (2022). Black trans feminism. Duke University Press. ISBN 978-1-4780-1781-3.
- Billard, T. J. (2024). Voices for transgender equality: Making change in the networked public sphere. ISBN 9780197695432.
- Brubaker, R. (2017). Trans: Gender and race in an age of unsettled identities. Princeton University Press. ISBN 978-0-6911-7235-4.
- Butler, J. (1993). Bodies that matter: On the discursive limits of sex. Routledge. ISBN 978-0-4156-1015-5.
- Butler, J. (1990). Gender trouble: Feminism and the subversion of identity. Routledge. ISBN 0-415-38955-0.
- Chiang, H. (Ed.) (2012). Transgender China. Palgrave Macmillan. ISBN 978-0-2303-4062-6.
- Chu, A. L. (2019). Females. Verso. ISBN 978-1-7887-3737-1.
- Currah, P. (2022). Sex is as sex does: Governing transgender identity. New York University Press. ISBN 978-0-8147-1710-3.
- Currah, P., Juang, R. M., & Minter, S. P. (Eds.) (2006). Transgender rights. University of Minnesota Press. ISBN 978-0-8166-4312-7.
- Davis, H. F. (2017). Beyond trans: Does gender matter? New York University Press. ISBN 978-1-4798-5540-7.
- Erickson-Schroth, L. (Ed.) (2014). Trans bodies, trans selves: A resource for the transgender community. Oxford University Press. ISBN 978-0-1993-2535-1.
- Feinberg, L. (1992). Transgender liberation: A movement whose time has come. World View Forum. ISBN 0-8956-7105-0.
- Gill-Peterson, J. (2018). Histories of the transgender child. University of Minnesota Press. ISBN 978-1-5179-0466-1.
- Gleeson, J. J., & O'Rourke, E. (2021). Transgender Marxism. Pluto Press. ISBN 978-0-7453-4166-8.
- Halberstam, J. (2018). Trans*: A quick and quirky account of gender variance. University of California Press. ISBN 978-0-5202-9269-7.
- Halberstam, J. (2011). The queer art of failure. Duke University Press. ISBN 978-0-8223-5045-3.
- Halberstam, J. (2005). In a queer time and place: Transgender bodies, subcultural lives. New York University Press. ISBN 978-0-8147-3585-5.
- Halberstam, J. (1998). Female masculinity. Duke University Press. ISBN 978-0-8223-2243-6.
- Malatino, H. (2022). Side affects: On being trans and feeling bad. University of Minnesota Press. ISBN 978-1-5179-1209-3.
- Malatino, H. (2020). Trans care. University of Minnesota Press. ISBN 978-1-5179-1118-8.
- Meyerowitz, J. J. (2002). How sex changed: A history of transsexuality in the United States. Harvard University Press. ISBN 978-0-6740-1379-7.
- Namaste, V. (2000). Invisible lives: The erasure of transsexual and transgendered people. University of Chicago Press. ISBN 978-0-2265-6810-2.
- Prosser, J. (1998). Second skins: The body narratives of transsexuality. Columbia University Press. ISBN 978-0-2311-0935-2.
- Ryan, J. M. (Ed.) (2021). Trans lives in a globalizing world: Rights, identities and politics. Routledge. ISBN 978-0-3671-9334-8.
- Serano, J. (2007). Whipping girl: A transsexual woman on sexism and the scapegoating of femininity. Seal Press. ISBN 978-1-5800-5622-9.
- Snorton, C. R. (2017). Black on both sides: A racial history of trans identity. University of Minnesota Press. ISBN 978-1-5179-0173-8.
- Spade, D. (2011). Normal life: Administrative violence, critical trans politics and the limits of law. South End Press. ISBN 978-0-8960-8796-5.
- Stryker, S. (2008). Transgender history. Seal Press. ISBN 978-0-7867-4136-6.
- Stryker, S., & Aizura, A. (Eds.) (2013). The transgender studies reader 2. Routledge. ISBN 978-0-4155-1773-7.
- Stryker, S., & Whittle, S. (Eds.) (2006). The transgender studies reader. Routledge. ISBN 978-0-4159-4709-1.
- Tourmaline, Stanley, E. A., & Burton, J. (Eds.) (2017). Trap door: Trans cultural production and the politics of visibility. MIT Press. ISBN 978-0-2620-3660-3.
- Vakoch, D. A. (Ed.) (2021). Transecology: Transgender perspectives on environment and nature. Routledge. ISBN 978-0-3675-1295-8.
- Vakoch, D. A. (Ed.) (2022). Transgender India: Understanding third gender identities and experiences. Springer. ISBN 978-3-030-96385-9.
- Vakoch, D. A., & Sharp, S. (Eds.) (2024). The Routledge handbook of trans literature. Routledge. ISBN 978-1-0324-3155-0.
- Valentine, D. (2007). Imagining transgender: An ethnography of a category. Duke University Press. ISBN 978-0-8223-3869-7.

=== Articles, chapters, and essays ===
- Adair, C. (2019). Licensing citizenship: Anti-Blackness, identification documents, and transgender studies. American Quarterly, 71(2), 569–594. doi:10.1353/aq.2019.0043.
- Bettcher, T. M. (2009). Evil deceivers and make-believers: On transphobic violence and the politics of illusion. Hypatia: A Journal of Feminist Philosophy, 22(3), 43–65. doi:10.1111/j.1527-2001.2007.tb01090.x.
- Bey, M. (2017). The trans*-ness of Blackness, the Blackness of trans*-ness. TSQ: Transgender Studies Quarterly, 4(2), 275–295. doi:10.1215/23289252-3815069.
- Billard, T. J. (2019). “Passing” and the politics of deception: Transgender bodies, cisgender aesthetics, and the policing of inconspicuous marginal identities. In T. Docan-Morgan (Ed.), The Palgrave handbook of deceptive communication (pp. 463–477). Palgrave Macmillan. doi:10.1007/978-3-319-96334-1_24.
- Billard, T. J., Everhart, A., & Zhang, E. (2022). Whither trans studies? On fields, post-disciplines, and the need for an applied transgender studies. Bulletin of Applied Transgender Studies, 1(1), 1–18. doi:10.57814/pe84-4348
- Billard, T. J., & Zhang, E. (2022). Toward a transgender critique of media representation. Journal of Cinema and Media Studies, 61(2), 194–199. doi:10.1353/cj.2022.0005
- Chaudhry, V. V. (2020). On trans dissemblance: Or, why trans studies needs black feminism. Signs: Journal of Women in Culture and Society, 45(3), 529–535. doi:10.1086/706466.
- Chu, A. L., & Drager, E. H. (2019). After trans studies. TSQ: Transgender Studies Quarterly, 6(1), 103–116. doi:10.1215/23289252-7253524.
- Green, K. M. (2016). Troubling the waters: Mobilizing a trans* analytic. In E. P. Johnson (Ed.), No tea, no shade: New writings in Black queer studies (pp. 65–82). Duke University Press.
- Green, K. M., & Bey, M. (2017). Where Black feminist thought and trans* feminism meet. Souls: A Critical Journal of Black Politics, Culture, and Society, 19(4), 438–454. doi:10.1080/10999949.2018.1434365.
- Johnson, A. H. (2016). Transnormativity: A new concept and its validation through documentary film about transgender men. Sociological Inquiry, 86(4), 465–491. doi:10.1111/soin.12127.
- Keegan, C. M. (2020). Getting disciplined: What's trans* about queer studies now? Journal of Homosexuality, 67(3), 384–397. doi:10.1080/00918369.2018.1530885.
- Keegan, C. M. (2020). Transgender studies, or how to do things with trans*. In S. B. Somerville (Ed.), The Cambridge companion to queer studies (pp. 66–78). Cambridge University Press. doi:10.1017/9781108699396.006.
- Koyama, E. (2006). Whose feminism is it anyway? The unspoken racism of the trans inclusion debate. In S. Stryker and S. Whittle (Eds.), The transgender studies reader (pp. 698–705). Routledge.
- Namaste, V. (2009). Undoing theory: The ‘transgender question' and the epistemic violence of Anglo‐American feminist theory. Hypatia: A Journal of Feminist Philosophy, 24(3), 11–32. doi:10.1111/j.1527-2001.2009.01043.x.
- Snorton, C. R., & Haritaworn, J. (2013). Trans necropolitics. In A. Aizura and S. Stryker (Eds.), The transgender studies reader 2 (pp. 66–76). Routledge.
- Stone, S. (1992). The Empire strikes back: A posttranssexual manifesto. Camera Obscura, 10(2), 150–176. doi:10.1215/02705346-10-2_29-150.
- Stryker, S. (2004). Transgender studies: Queer theory's evil twin. GLQ: A Journal of Lesbian and Gay Studies, 10(2), 212–215. doi:10.1215/10642684-10-2-212.
- Stryker, S. (1994). My words to Victor Frankenstein above the village of Chamounix: Performing transgender rage. GLQ: A Journal of Lesbian and Gay Studies, 1(3), 237–254. doi:10.1215/10642684-1-3-237.
- Towle, E. B., & Morgan, L. M. (2002). Romancing the transgender native: Rethinking the use of the "third gender" concept. GLQ: A Journal of Lesbian and Gay Studies, 8(4), 469–497. doi:10.1215/10642684-8-4-469.

== See also ==
- Transgender
- Transgender literature
- List of transgender publications
- Transgender history
- Transgender rights
- LGBTQ communication studies
