= Center for Applied Transgender Studies =

U.S. nonprofit organization

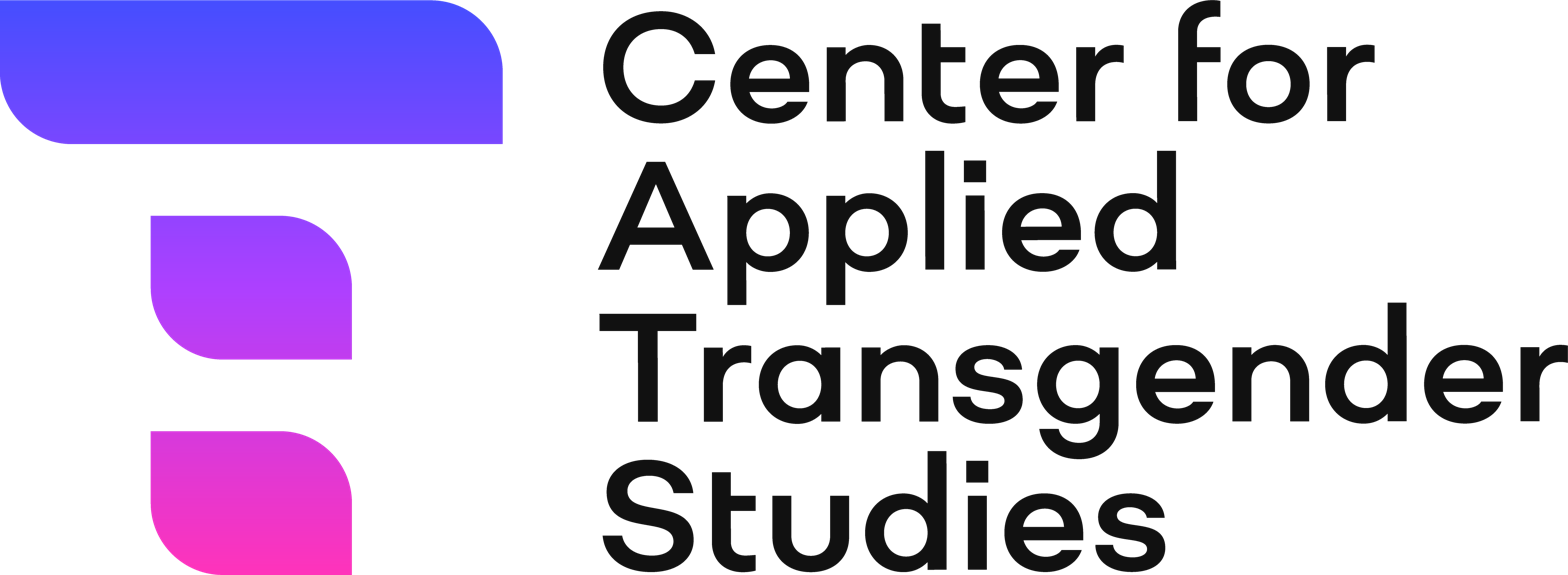
- Founded: January 29, 2021; 5 years ago
- Founders: TJ Billard, Avery Everhart, and Erique Zhang
- Type: Nonprofit research organization
- Tax ID no.: 86-2111392
- Legal status: 501(c)(3) nonprofit organization
- Purpose: Academic research, policy advocacy, and public education
- Location: Chicago, Illinois, United States
- Executive Director: TJ Billard
- Revenue: less than $50,000 (2021)
- Website: www.appliedtransstudies.org

The Center for Applied Transgender Studies (CATS) is an independent nonprofit research organization founded in 2021 in Chicago, Illinois. The organization works to promote empirical academic research on issues of relevance to transgender populations globally and mobilizes scholarly knowledge to engage in both policy advocacy and public education. Together with Northwestern University Libraries, CATS publishes the platinum open access peer-reviewed academic journal Bulletin of Applied Transgender Studies.

Within the transgender movement, CATS is best known for combating widespread misinformation about transgender health and politics. Within academia, the organization is best known for its development and advancement of applied transgender studies as a key area of scholarly research.

== History ==
The Center for Applied Transgender Studies (CATS) was founded on January 29, 2021, by academic researchers and transgender rights activists TJ Billard, Avery Everhart, and Erique Zhang. The three founders formed the organization's initial board of directors, with Billard serving as the organization's first executive director. V Varun Chaudhry and Ryan Karnoski later joined the board as at-large representatives. The organization was publicly launched on March 31, 2021, in commemoration of International Transgender Day of Visibility.

CATS launched as a closed membership organization whose members are referred to as Fellows. Members join the organization at one of two different ranks: Senior Fellow (meaning the member holds one or more terminal degrees) or Junior Fellow (meaning the member is enrolled in a terminal-degree-seeking program). At the time of the organization's launch, CATS consisted of 30 Fellows, 20 of whom were Senior Fellows and 10 of whom were Junior Fellows. This cohort of Fellows included scholars working in five countries and at a variety of research institutions, including Google, Johns Hopkins University, NASA, New York University, Northwestern University, Princeton University, the University of California, Berkeley, the University of Michigan, the University of North Carolina at Chapel Hill, the University of Pennsylvania, the University of Southern California, and the University of Washington. In July 2021, CATS opened competitive applications for new members, who were evaluated and appointed by the organization's board of directors. In December 2021, the organization announced that 10 of the nearly 200 applicants were selected to join CATS as Fellows, with four new Senior Fellows and six new Junior Fellows joining. These Fellows included scholars from Stanford University, the University of California, Los Angeles, and Yale University. CATS prioritizes the principle of “by trans people... for trans people,” and thus all of the organization's Fellows are transgender.

== Bulletin of Applied Transgender Studies ==
Bulletin of Applied Transgender Studies
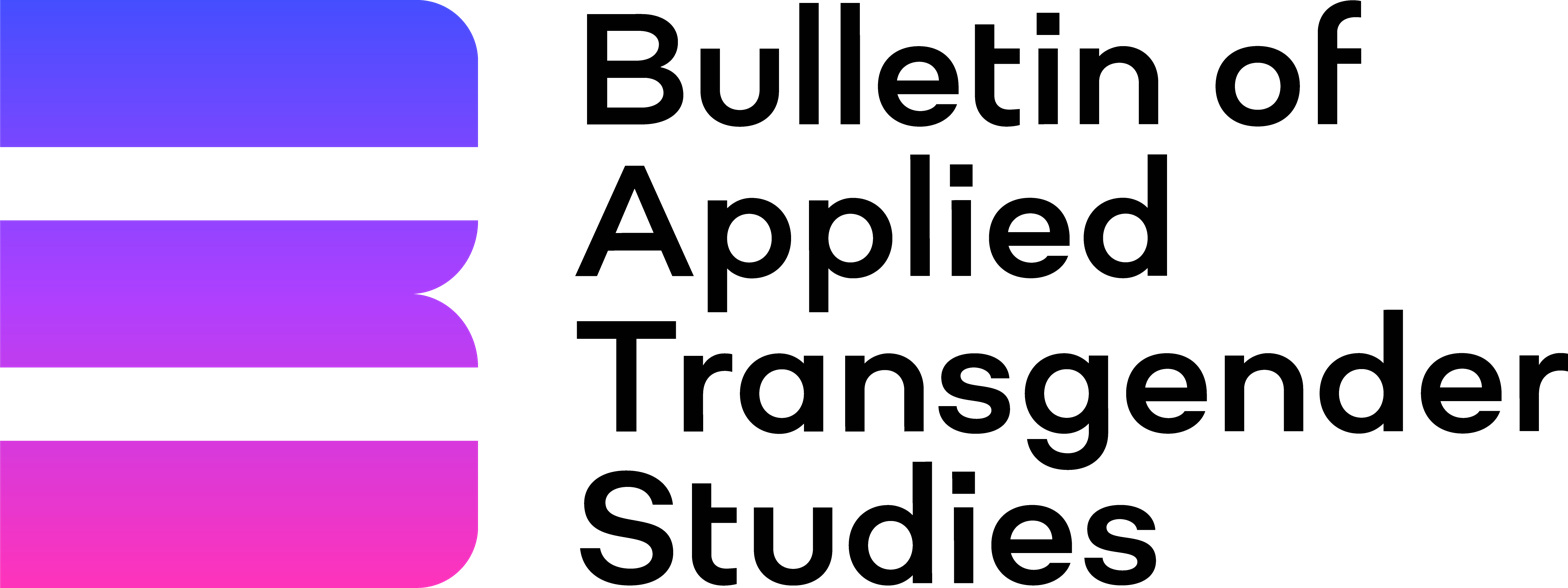
- Discipline: Transgender Studies
- Language: English
- Edited by: Thomas J Billard

Publication details
- History: 2022–present
- Publisher: Northwestern University Libraries
- Frequency: Quarterly
- Open access: Platinum open access
- License: Creative Commons Attribution-NonCommercial-NoDerivatives (by-nc-nd)

Standard abbreviations
- ISO 4: Bull. Appl. Transgend. Stud.

Indexing
- ISSN: 2769-2124
- OCLC no.: 1260250007

Links
- Journal homepage

On August 2, 2021, CATS announced the launch of its flagship publication, the Bulletin of Applied Transgender Studies. The journal is published by Northwestern University Libraries on behalf of the organization. The Bulletin is the first open access journal dedicated to transgender studies and the first journal dedicated to empirical research on transgender social, cultural, and political issues. In contrast, Transgender Studies Quarterly (published by Duke University Press) focuses on humanistic inquiry, while Transgender Health (published by Mary Ann Liebert) and the International Journal of Transgender Health (published by Taylor & Francis) focus on health research, and all three journals are paywalled.

The Bulletin is led by founding editor and CATS executive director Thomas J Billard and an interdisciplinary editorial board consisting of scholars from eight countries on four continents. All of the journal's editorial board members are transgender, making it the first academic journal to have an all-trans editorial board. Notable board members include Alejandra Caraballo, the second trans woman of color to teach at Harvard Law School, the first openly trans community board member in Brooklyn, and a former staff attorney at the Transgender Legal Defense & Education Fund, and Paisley Currah, founding co-editor of Transgender Studies Quarterly and founding board member of the Transgender Law and Policy Institute.

The Bulletin's inaugural double issue was published on June 13, 2022, featuring research from scholars across a range of academic disciplines.

== See also ==
- List of transgender-related topics
- List of transgender-rights organizations
- List of transgender publications
- List of LGBT rights organizations
- List of learned societies
