= LGBT Health (journal) =

- Discipline: Healthcare, queer studies
- Language: English
- Edited by: Carl G. Streed Jr

Publication details
- History: 2014–present
- Publisher: Mary Ann Liebert
- Frequency: Bimonthly
- Impact factor: 3.1 (2025)

Standard abbreviations
- ISO 4: LGBT Health

Indexing
- ISSN: 2325-8292 (print); 2325-8306 (web)
- LCCN: 2012273834
- OCLC no.: 949982837

Links
- Journal homepage; Online access; Online archive

LGBT Health is a bimonthly peer-reviewed medical journal covering healthcare as it relates to LGBTQ people. It was established in 2014 and is published by Mary Ann Liebert, Inc. The current interim editor-in-chief is Carl G. Streed (Boston University School of Medicine). The previous editor-in-chief was William Byne (Columbia University). According to the Journal Citation Reports, the journal has a 2025 impact factor of 3.1.

== See also ==
- Transgender Health
- International Journal of Transgender Health
- Transgender Studies Quarterly
