= Andrea Long Chu =

American writer (born 1992)

- Born: 1992 (age 33–34); Chapel Hill, North Carolina, U.S.
- Education: Duke University (BA); New York University (MA)
- Occupation: Writer
- Writing career
- Language: English
- Period: 2018–present
- Subjects: Literary criticism; transgender studies
- Notable works: Females, Authority
- Website: www.andrealongchu.com

Andrea Long Chu (born 1992) is an American writer and critic. Chu has written for such publications as n+1 and The New York Times, and various academic journals including Differences, Women & Performance, and Transgender Studies Quarterly. Chu's first book, Females, was published in 2019 by Verso Books and was a finalist for the Lambda Literary Award. In 2021, she joined the staff at New York magazine as a book critic.

Chu received the Pulitzer Prize for Criticism in 2023 for "book reviews that scrutinize authors as well as their works, using multiple cultural lenses to explore some of society's most fraught topics." She is a transgender woman.

== Early life and education ==
Chu was born in Chapel Hill, North Carolina in 1992. Her father was finishing a medical residency at the University of North Carolina and her mother was in graduate school at the time of her birth. Her father is of Chinese descent. A few years later, Chu moved with her family to Asheville, North Carolina. Although she described Asheville as a "very hippy dippy kind of place," Chu said that she was "raised pretty Christian." She attended a small Christian school. Her family belonged to a conservative Presbyterian church. Chu described her childhood as "saturated" with Christianity.

Chu graduated with a B.A. in Literature from Duke University and an M.A. in Comparative Literature from New York University.

== Career ==
Chu is the book critic for New York magazine and has previously written for The New Yorker, Bookforum and n+1. To date, she has written critical reviews of books by Hanya Yanagihara, Maggie Nelson, Octavia E. Butler, Ottessa Moshfegh, and The Velveteen Rabbit. Chu has also contributed op-eds to The New York Times, including "My New Vagina Won't Make Me Happy." In 2021, Chu published a full-length profile on writer and model Emily Ratajkowski for The New York Times Magazine and has maintained a friendship with her since.

=== "On Liking Women" ===
In 2018, Chu published "On Liking Women" in n+1 magazine. The essay considers Chu's own gender transition, with Chu writing: "I have never been able to differentiate liking women from wanting to be like them." It discusses Chu's fascination with Valerie Solanas' SCUM Manifesto and contrasts her attitude about her gender transition with previous iterations of feminist thought.

Writer Sandy Stone praised Chu's essay for "launching 'the second wave' of trans studies." Noah Zazanis, in The New Inquiry, expressed ambivalence about "On Liking Women" from a transmasculine perspective, writing: "If turning your back on manhood is an ultimately feminist act, what are we to make of the decision to become a man?". Amia Srinivasan noted in the London Review of Books that the essay "threatens to bolster the argument made by anti-trans feminists: that trans women equate, and conflate, womanhood with the trappings of traditional femininity, thereby strengthening the hand of patriarchy". Chu responded to Srinivasan's comments in a dialogue with Anastasia Berg that was published in The Point.

=== Females ===
Chu's first book Females was published in 2019 by Verso Books. Chu took Valerie Solanas (radical feminist author who famously shot Andy Warhol) as the motivation for writing this book. Frieze described it as "a work of memoir (sort of), a provocation, gender theory(ish), film and art criticism all rolled into one." In the Los Angeles Review of Books, poet Kay Gabriel wrote that in Females, "Chu makes a claim about what she calls an ontological, or an existential, condition. Being female, in her account, is a subject position outside and against politics." As such, Chu's definition of femaleness does not refer to gender or biological sex.

Females was selected as a finalist for the Lambda Literary Award in Transgender Nonfiction. It has received mixed responses. As Frieze describes, "In many ways, it is astonishing: a crucial theory looking to sexuality to formulate questions around gender. Yet, a lot of people I know have found Females confusing, a difficult read, an exercise in logic, not what they were expecting, controversial, offensive – especially those who know their theory."

=== "Freedom of Sex" ===
Chu wrote the March 2024 cover story "Freedom of Sex" for New York magazine. In the essay, Chu argues that "in principle, everyone should have access to sex-changing medical care, regardless of age, gender identity, social environment, or psychiatric history... For now, parents must learn to treat their kids as what they are: human beings capable of freedom."

Fellow New York writer Jonathan Chait disagreed with Chu's rights-based argument while praising the essay's "honesty" for acknowledging the different sides of the debate. The Atlantic staff writer Helen Lewis criticized Chu's "full-throttle libertarianism," calling it "about as popular as the case for letting 9-year-olds get nose jobs."

Also in the essay, Chu coined the term TARL, or trans-agnostic reactionary liberal, to describe a third faction of the "anti-trans bloc in America today" in addition to the religious right and TERFs. She identified The New York Times as the "leading voice" for this newer strain of thought.

=== Authority ===
In 2025, Chu released Authority, a collection of essays on themes including literature, music, pop culture, theory and criticism, genre and gender. It features two new essays titled 'Criticism in Crisis' and 'Authority', which tackle the idea of criticism. Frieze described how her "research elegantly folds context and detail into her personal evaluations."

== Personal life ==
In a 2018 interview, Chu said that she was in a relationship with a cis woman who was helpful in preparing for Chu's sex reassignment surgery.

== Writing ==
=== Books ===
- Authority: Essays (2025)
- Females (2019)

=== Essays ===
- "Freedom of Sex". New York. March 11, 2024.
- "Misreading Octavia Butler". New York. November 21, 2022.
- "Ottessa Moshfegh". New York. June 16, 2022.
- "The Mixed Metaphor". New York. September 27, 2022.
- "The Velveteen Rabbit Was Always More Than a Children's Book". New York. November 8, 2022.
- "Hanya's Boys". New York. January 12, 2022.
- "The Emily Ratajkowski You'll Never See". The New York Times. November 8, 2021.
- "The Impossibility of Feminism". differences. 30 (1). May 1, 2019.
- "After Trans Studies". Transgender Studies Quarterly. 6 (1). With Emmett Harsin Drager. February 1, 2019.
- "On Liking Women". n+1. No. 30. Winter 2018.
- "My New Vagina Won't Make Me Happy". The New York Times. November 24, 2018.
- "I Worked With Avital Ronell. I Believe Her Accuser". The Chronicle of Higher Education. August 30, 2018.
- "Wanting Bad Things: Andrea Long Chu responds to Amia Srinivasan". The Point Magazine. July 18, 2018.

== Sources ==
- Blanchard, Sessi Kuwabara (September 11, 2018). "Andrea Long Chu is the Cult Writer Changing Gender Theory". Vice.
- Chu, Andrea Long (Winter 2018a). "On Liking Women". N Plus One (30).
- Chu, Andrea Long (August 30, 2018b). "I Worked with Avital Ronell. I Believe Her Accuser". The Chronicle of Higher Education.
- Chu, Andrea Long (November 24, 2018c). "Opinion: My New Vagina Won't Make Me Happy". The New York Times.
- Chu, Andrea Long (2018e). "Black Infinity: Slavery and Freedom in Hegel's Africa". The Journal of Speculative Philosophy. 32 (3, Special Issue with the Society for Phenomenology and Existential Philosophy): 414–425. doi:10.5325/jspecphil.32.3.0414. JSTOR 10.5325/jspecphil.32.3.0414. S2CID 149732496.
- Chu, Andrea Long Chu; Berg, Anastasia (May 22, 2018d). "Wanting Bad Things: Andrea Long Chu responds to Amia Srinivasan". The Point.
- Chu, Andrea Long (May 1, 2019). "The Impossibility of Feminism". Differences. 30 (1): 63–81. doi:10.1215/10407391-7481232. ISSN 1040-7391.
- Lorusso, Marissa (October 30, 2019). "In 'Females,' The State Is Less A Biological Condition Than An Existential One". NPR.
- O'Brien, Michelle Esther (November 2, 2018). "Interview with Andrea Long Chu" (PDF). New York Public Library Community Oral History Project. Archived from the original on January 12, 2020.
- Srinivasan, Amia (March 22, 2018). "Does Anyone Have the Right to Sex?". London Review of Books. 40 (6): 5–10.
- Thom, Kai Cheng (November 29, 2018). "The Pain—and Joy—of Transition". Slate.
