= Ruth Pearce =

Ruth Pearce may refer to:

- Ruth Pearce (diplomat), Australian diplomat
- Ruth Pearce (sociologist) (born 1986), British sociologist
- Ruth Pearce (Doctors), a fictional character in the British television series Doctors
