= Margaret Tedesco =

American curator and visual artist (c. 1952–2025)

- Born: April 25, 1952; Los Angeles, California, U.S.
- Died: October 18, 2025 (aged 73); San Francisco, California, U.S.
- Occupations: Visual artist, curator, dancer, choreographer
- Known for: Performance art, installation art, photography, video art, modern dance, graphic designer

Margaret Tedesco (April 25, 1952 – October 18, 2025) was an American independent curator and visual artist in the San Francisco Bay Area. Tedesco was one of the curators of the New Langton Arts in San Francisco, California; and founded [the 2nd floor projects] in 2007, an exhibition space and small press publisher. She had also worked as a graphic designer, modern dancer and choreographer.

== Life and career ==
Tedesco was born and raised in Los Angeles, California. In her early career in the 1980s she was as a modern dancer, and choreographer in Santa Barbara, California, and often worked with Laurie Burnaby. During this period she took dance workshops at LACE (Los Angeles Contemporary Exhibitions).

Tedesco moved to San Francisco in 1988, where she continued modern dance and she developed a new visual arts practice, and by the late 1990s her career focus turned to curatorial work. Her art practice was multidisciplinary in the mediums of photography, performance art, installation art, and video art. Tedesco's artwork has been exhibited internationally and nationally. For many years she was a graphic designer at the San Francisco Art Institute (SFAI).

She was a curatorial member of the New Langton Arts, a not-for-profit contemporary arts organization in San Francisco, California from 1999 to 2007. Around 1999, Tedesco co-founded Moving Target Series, a performance and exhibition pop-up in San Francisco. She founded [the 2nd floor projects] in 2007, an exhibition space and small press publisher, initially based in the Mission District out of her rented apartment. Additionally she assisted with the SFMOMA’s Open Space, and Visual AIDS exhibitions.

Tedesco died of cancer in California on October 18, 2025.

== Exhibitions as visual artist ==
- Fight and Flight: Crafting a Bay Area Life (2023), group exhibition, Museum of Craft and Design, San Francisco, California; including artists Libby Black, Craig Calderwood, Erica Deeman, Cheryl Derricotte, Ala Ebtekar, Liz Harvey, Angela Hennessy, Alexander Hernandez, Liz Hernández, Cathy Lu, Michelle Yi Martin, Adia Millett, Nasim Moghadam, Richard-Jonathan Nelson, Ramekon O’Arwisters, yétúndé ọlágbajú, Woody De Othello, Related Tactics, Charlene Tan, Margaret Tedesco and Leila Weefur, Lauren Toomer, and Jenifer K. Wofford

== Exhibitions as curator ==
- Seven Places of the Mind (2018), fused space gallery, San Francisco, California; curated by Tedesco
- With(out) With(in) the very moment (2019), San Francisco Arts Commission Gallery in the War Memorial Veterans Building, San Francisco, California; curated by Tedesco
- A Spirit of Disruption (2021), Walter and McBean Galleries and Diego Rivera Gallery at San Francisco Art Institute, San Francisco, California; curated by Tedesco and Leila Weefur
