= Man Alive =

Man Alive may refer to:

== Film and television ==
- Man Alive (1945 film), American romantic comedy
- Man Alive! (1952 film), 1952 American documentary short
- Man Alive (British TV series), 1965–1981 documentary and current affairs series
- Man Alive (Canadian TV program), 1967–2000 faith and spirituality program

== Literature ==
- Manalive, 1912 novel by G. K. Chesterton
- "Man Alive" (short story), 1947 Nero Wolfe mystery novella by Rex Stout
- Man Alive! (play), a 1955 comedy play by John Dighton
- Man Alive!, 2013 novel by Mary Kay Zuravleff
- Man Alive (book), 2014 nonfiction book by Thomas Page McBee

== Music ==
- "Man Alive" (song), a 1992 song by Diesel
- Man Alive (band), Israeli punk rock band formed in 1999
- Man Alive, a 2003 album by Eugene Kelly
- Man Alive! (Stephen Stills album), 2005
- Man Alive (Man Alive album), 2008
- Man Alive (Everything Everything album), 2010
- "Man Alive!", song by Billy Talent from Dead Silence (album), 2012
- A Man Alive, a 2016 album by Thao & The Get Down Stay Down
- Man Alive! (King Krule album), 2020
