= IJT =

IJT may refer to:

- International Journal of Transgenderism (now the International Journal of Transgender Health)
- Islami Jamiat-e-Talaba, a student organization in Pakistan
