= Friedemann Pfäfflin =

German psychiatrist

Friedemann Pfäfflin (born 1945) is Professor of Psychotherapy and head of the Forensic Psychotherapy Unit at the University of Ulm. He was a trained as a psychiatrist at the University of Hamburg. He visited the Johns Hopkins Gender Identity Clinic in the 1970s and has worked in this field since then. He worked at from 1978 to 1992 at the Institute for Sex Research and Forensic Psychiatry at Hamburg University. He received his Privatdozent in Psychiatry in 1993. He then moved onto to work at Ulm again working in Gender Identity. His range of research interests include Gender dysphoria, research into psychotherapy, Forensic psychiatry, and History of psychiatry. From 1995 to 1997, he was President of the Harry Benjamin International Gender Dysphoria Association now called World Professional Association for Transgender Health. He founded The International Journal of Transgenderism now International Journal of Transgender Health in 1997 with Eli Coleman. He was also previously the president of The International Association for Forensic Psychotherapy.

== Publications ==
=== Books ===
- Transgenderism and Intersexuality in Childhood and Adolescence - jointly with Peggy T. Cohen-Kettenis and published in February 2003.
- A Matter of Security The Application of Attachment Theory to Forensic Psychiatry and Psychotherapy - edited alongside Gwen Adshead.

=== Journal articles ===
- Harry Benjamin in The International Encyclopedia of Human Sexuality 20 April 2015
