= Ruth Pearce (sociologist) =

British sociologist

- Alma mater: University of Warwick
- Occupation: Researcher
- Employer: University of Glasgow; University of Leeds (2017–2020); University of Warwick (2011–2017); University of Warwick (2016–2017)
- Website: ruthpearce.net

Ruth Pearce (born 1986) is a British sociologist who is known for her research in transgender studies. Her work explores issues of inequality, marginalisation, power, and how communities of marginalised peoples can work to transform their lives. She is a senior fellow at the Center for Applied Transgender Studies (CATS) and a lecturer in community development at the University of Glasgow's School of Education.

She earned her PhD in sociology at the University of Warwick in 2016. She is editor-in-chief of the Community Development Journal, published by Oxford University Press. She also formerly served on the editorial board of The Sociological Review. Her works include Understanding Trans Health: Discourse, Power and Possibility (Policy Press, 2018). She also co-edited the volumes The Emergence of Trans: Cultures, Politics and Everyday Lives (Routledge, 2019) and TERF Wars: Feminism and the Fight for Transgender Futures, the latter published in The Sociological Review’s monograph series in 2020. She provided evidence to the Women and Equalities Committee regarding reform of the Gender Recognition Act.

== Bibliography ==
- Understanding Trans Health: Discourse, Power and Possibility, Policy Press, 2018
- The Emergence of Trans: Cultures, Politics and Everyday Lives, Routledge, 2019, edited with Igi Moon, Kat Gupta, and Deborah Lynn Steinberg
- TERF Wars: Feminism and the Fight for Transgender Futures, The Sociological Review monograph series, 2020, edited with Ben Vincent and Sonja Erikainen
