= International Journal of Sexual Health =

- Discipline: Sexology
- Language: English
- Edited by: Eli Coleman

Publication details
- Former name(s): Journal of Psychology & Human Sexuality
- History: 1988–present
- Publisher: Routledge on behalf of the World Association for Sexual Health
- Frequency: Quarterly
- Impact factor: 2.2 (2023)

Standard abbreviations
- ISO 4: Int. J. Sex. Health

Indexing
- ISSN: 1931-7611 (print); 1931-762X (web)
- LCCN: 2006214611
- OCLC no.: 68192141

Links
- Journal homepage; Online access; Online archive

The International Journal of Sexual Health is a peer-reviewed academic journal that covers research on sexual health as a state of physical, emotional, mental, and social well-being. It is the official journal of the World Association for Sexual Health. The editor-in-chief is Eli Coleman (University of Minnesota).

The journal was established in 1988 under the title Journal of Psychology & Human Sexuality.
