= Transgender Health =

- Discipline: Healthcare, transgender health
- Language: English
- Edited by: Robert Garofalo

Publication details
- History: 2016–present
- Publisher: Mary Ann Liebert
- Frequency: Bimonthly
- Impact factor: 4.427 (2021)

Standard abbreviations
- ISO 4: Transgend. Health

Indexing
- ISSN: 2688-4887 (print); 2380-193X (web)
- LCCN: 2019200574
- OCLC no.: 914233906

Links
- Journal homepage; Online archive

Transgender Health is a bimonthly peer-reviewed academic journal covering transgender health. It was established in 2016 and is published by Mary Ann Liebert. The editor-in-chief is Robert Garofalo (Northwestern University).

== Abstracting and indexing ==
The journal is abstracted and indexed in PsycINFO, Current Contents/Clinical Medicine, Current Contents/Social and Behavioral Sciences, Science Citation Index Expanded, and the Social Sciences Citation Index. According to the Journal Citation Reports, the journal has a 2021 impact factor of 4.427.

== See also ==
- LGBT Health
- International Journal of Transgender Health
- Transgender Studies Quarterly
- List of transgender publications
