= Authority (essay collection) =

2025 book by Andrea Long Chu

Authority: Essays
- Author: Andrea Long Chu
- Language: English
- Subject: Literary Criticism, Feminism
- Genre: Non-fiction
- Published: April 8, 2025
- Publisher: Farrar, Straus and Giroux
- Publication place: United States

Authority: Essays is a 2025 book of essays by critic Andrea Long Chu. The book collects media reviews, personal essays and essays on the nature of critical authority. These include reviews of Bret Easton Ellis, Hanya Yanagihara, Zadie Smith and Andrew Lloyd Webber. Her personal essays include "On Liking Women", which discussed her gender transition in terms of desire instead of identity, and "The Pink" which discussed feminism and her bottom surgery. The essay "Authority" considers the history of the concept of critical and political authority.
