= Mom, I Need to Be a Girl =

1998 non-fiction work by Just Evelyn

Mom, I Need to be a Girl
- Author: Just Evelyn
- Language: English
- Publisher: Walter Trock
- Publication date: April 2, 1998
- Publication place: United States
- Media type: Print (Paperback)
- Pages: 116
- ISBN: 0-966-32720-9

Mom, I Need to be a Girl is a 1998 non-fiction work by "Just Evelyn", the mother of a transgender former teenager. It recounts how her daughter Danielle Lindenmuth (born Daniel) began transitioning from male to female at 15, and completed sex reassignment surgery at 18, with the support of the author and her sons. Evelyn wrote the book and published it in 1998 because she could not find similar resources available to the families of transgender people, especially teenagers. The book has been recommended by various transgender support resources, and is available in print and for free online.

== Quotes ==
- "I would never wear your funky old clothes, you are a woman and can do all those things, and yet you don't. That's such a waste!" - Danielle Lindenmuth
- "Is a mother's love enough?" - Just Evelyn

== See also ==
- List of transgender-related topics
- Transgender publications
