= Amateur (book) =

2018 book by Thomas Page McBee

Amateur: A True Story About What Makes a Man
- Author: Thomas Page McBee
- Language: English
- Genre: Memoir
- Publisher: Scribner
- Publication date: August 14, 2018
- Publication place: United States
- Media type: Print
- ISBN: 9781501168741

Amateur: A True Story About What Makes a Man is a nonfiction book by Thomas Page McBee, published August 14, 2018, by Scribner.

The book was a finalist for a Lambda Literary Award for Transgender Nonfiction and was shortlisted for The Baillie Gifford Prize for Non-Fiction and the Wellcome Book Prize.

== Background ==
McBee began regularly writing about masculinity in The Rumpus, which led to his first book, Man Alive, in 2014. During this time, he was transitioning and "wrestling with the implications of embracing a gender responsible for so much hurt in the world."

In hopes of improving his self-defense skills and further investigating masculinity, McBee began boxing and eventually participated in a charitable boxing match, making him the first transgender man to box in Madison Square Garden.

== Reception ==
Amateur received a starred review from Publishers Weekly, as well as positive reviews from Kirkus, The New Republic, BuzzFeed, Booklist, The Rumpus, The Guardian, Los Angeles Review of Books, and Shelf Awareness. Kirkus called the book "[p]rovocative and illuminating". Writing for Shelf Awareness, Dave Wheeler noted that "McBee ponders these sociological implications [of masculinity] with refreshing care and empathy, untangling a positive depiction of masculinity from the toxic strains paraded through contemporary discourse. His writing is marvelous, pinning ideas that could so easily be abstract to the visceral, physical poetry of boxing." The Rumpus called it "a must-read for parsing through the many layers of toxic masculinity and white privilege in American culture that allowed Kavanaugh to be seated on the Supreme Court."

The Financial Times and The A.V. Club provided mixed reviews. Robert Armstrong of The Financial Times said, "Amateur is a heck of a tale, and McBee is a gifted memoirist. He is particularly good at communicating his own fear and ambivalence—both in crossing the gender frontier and in learning a sport that draws on a brutal code of male behaviour that his experience has given him reason to reject." Writing for The A.V. Club, Amanda Goldblatt noted that the book covered "countless topics... a lot to pack into such a thin volume, which weighs in at just over 200 pages," meaning the "discussions can sometimes feel fleeting, moving more like a feature article than a book." However, Goldbatt complimented McBee's "genius for association and nimble structural moves."

The book was included on lists of the best memoirs, best nonfiction, and best LGBT books of 2018.

Awards for Amateur
Year	Award	Result	Ref.
2018	The Baillie Gifford Prize for Non-Fiction	Shortlist	
2019	Lambda Literary Award for Transgender Nonfiction	Finalist	
2019	Wellcome Book Prize	Shortlist	
