= Sex Is as Sex Does =

Book about gender and transgender politics

- Author: Paisley Currah
- Language: English
- Genre: Non-fiction
- Publisher: NYU Press
- Publication date: May 2022
- Pages: 231
- ISBN: 978-0-8147-1710-3
- Dewey Decimal: 306.76/80973
- LC Class: HQ77.95.U6 C87 2022

Sex Is as Sex Does: Governing Transgender Identity is a 2022 work by political scientist and transgender activist, Paisley Currah.

== Overview ==
Currah's text diverges from the common discourses around gender and sex as identities and instead asks what it is that sex classifications do. He ultimately argues that, in the United States, sex classifications are based on what the role of "sex" as a category is intended to do in a particular set of circumstances. As such, he defines "sex" as "whatever an entity whose decisions are backed by the force of law says it is" in a given context.

Currah's book has five chapters, an introduction, and conclusion. An outline of the contents of the work, not including the introduction and conclusion, is:

1. If Sex Is Not a Biological Phenomenon
2. Sex and Popular Sovereignty
3. Sex Classification as a Technology of Governance
4. Till Birth Do Us Part: Marriage, ID Documents, and the Nation-State
5. Incarceration, Identity Politics, and the Trans-Cis Divide

=== Core arguments ===
Throughout the book, Currah explores three central arguments regarding sex classification systems:

1. "Sex classifications were necessary to the administration of policies that used gender as a technology of government." For instance, prior to the Obergefell v. Hodges case in 2015, which resulted in recognition of same-sex marriage across the United States, sex classifications were an important tool in policies regarding marriage, and thus property ownership and the construction of familial relationships. Currah notes that marriage is "an instrument of governing" and nation-building, and inextricably linked to the "transmission of property."
2. The "existence of conflicting rules for classifying sex . . . expresses the different work that sex does in different contexts," showing that sex is "operationalized as a mobile technology of government." This is exemplified by cases where transgender people, prior to the legalization of same-sex marriage in the US, were often still barred from marriage to cisgender people of the same sex even as they had legally changed their sex on, for example, their driving license.
3. More recently, the term "transgender" itself has become the subject of political divisions and is used in the context of American party politics, where conservatives tend to advocate for policies against (explicitly or implicitly) transgender people, and liberals advocate for policies that expand transgender recognition/inclusion in American life. Currah argues that the visibility of transgender people has not been as positive as transgender activists hoped it would be, and that the transgender movement's push for state recognition is not the solution, even as he does also support such recognition as a short-term goal.

== Reception ==
Reviews of Sex Is as Sex Does note, firstly, that the text is accessible. One reviewer, Garriga-López, referred to the work as "accessible and clearly written in a way that makes it especially suitable for undergraduate students as well as people outside of academia who want to deepen their understanding of transgender politics." As many academic works are not considered accessible to many, especially the public, Currah's ability to write a thorough and comprehensive, theoretical work while remaining accessible to a wider readership is significant.

Reviews also praise Currah's book for its unique approaches to the state and its challenge to the binary of cisgender and transgender identity categories. Currah frames the state as not a single entity, but as a range of organizations. As J.A. Beicken wrote in their review, Currah reminds scholars to "attend to the plurality of states rather than conceive of one monolithic state." With regard to cisgender and transgender identities, Currah reminds readers of how these tools of sex classification are not solely used against transgender people, and (in Beicken's words) suggests that "readers should be wary of cementing a trans-/ cisgender binary, overlooking the nuances within those categories."

Rae Willis-Conger, in a review published in Gender & Society, offers a methodological and structural critique of Sex Is as Sex Does, writing that "although the arguments Currah makes in each chapter are solid, the book could have been tied together better by a more specific historical grounding."

== See also ==
- Transgender rights movement
- Transgender studies
- Theories of state
