= Females (Chu book) =

2019 book by Andrea Long Chu

- First edition
- Author: Andrea Long Chu
- Language: English
- Publisher: Verso Books
- Publication date: 2019
- ISBN: 978-1-78873-737-1

Females is the 2019 debut book by writer Andrea Long Chu. The book is a work of gender studies, literary and film criticism and memoir centered on the premise that "everyone is female and everyone hates it."

== Overview ==
"Femaleness" in the book is described as a state of self-sacrifice to make room for the desire of others. The book argues desire is a central part of gender for both transgender and cisgender people. The book was inspired by the writing of controversial feminist Valerie Solanas and each chapter of Females begins with quotes from Solanas' play Up Your Ass.

== Reception ==
Females was nominated for the 32nd Lambda Literary Awards in the Transgender Nonfiction category.

In the Los Angeles Review of Books, Kay Gabriel wrote that the problem with the book "is that its theses have conceptual consequences and social implications, whether or not, in the last instance, Chu really means what she says."
