= Eli Coleman =

American psychologist and sexologist

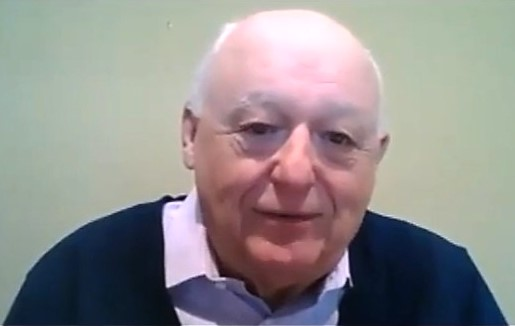
- Coleman in 2021
- Born: August 25, 1948 (age 77); Buffalo, New York, U.S.
- Citizenship: USA
- Awards: Surgeon General's Exemplary Service Medal; Gold Medal of the World Association for Sexual Health
- Scientific career
- Fields: Psychology, Sexology
- Institutions: University of Minnesota

Eli Coleman is an American psychologist and sexologist. He is professor emeritus and former director of the Eli Coleman Institute for Sexual and Gender Health (formerly the Program in Human Sexuality) in the Department of Family Medicine and Community Health at the University of Minnesota. In 2007, he was appointed the first endowed Chair in Sexual Health at the University of Minnesota Medical School. He has published research on sexual orientation, sexual dysfunction and compulsivity, gender dysphoria, and sex offenders.

== Membership in scientific societies ==
Coleman is the founding and current editor of the International Journal of Sexual Health (formerly the Journal of Psychology and Human Sexuality). He was also the founding editor of the International Journal of Transgender Health.

He is one of the past-presidents of the Society for the Scientific Study of Sexuality, the World Professional Association for Transgender Health (formerly the Harry Benjamin International Gender Dysphoria Association), the World Association for Sexual Health (WAS), International Academy of Sex Research, and the Society for Sex Therapy and Research. He is an elected Fellow of the Society for the Scientific Study of Sexuality.

== Views ==
Regarding sexual addiction, Coleman has said, "I think the term 'addiction' is overused and implies that all behavioral excesses can be explained by some similar mechanism. What we know about alcohol and drug addictions cannot simply be transferred to other behavioral excesses. Sex is a basic appetitive drive that for some people becomes out of balance for a variety of reasons. For some it is a problem of impulse control. For others it is more like an obsession. For others, it is like a compulsion. And for others, it is a part of their personality structure and has nothing to do with impulse control, obsessions, or compulsions."

== Publications ==
=== Books ===
Gender Dysphoria, Interdisciplinary Approaches in Clinical Management - Walter O. Bockting, Eli Coleman. The Haworth Press, Inc. 1992 ISBN 1-56024-473-9

=== Papers ===
Some of his significant papers are:

- Coleman, E. "Developmental Stages of the Coming Out Process." Journal of Homosexuality 7(2/3):31—43, 1981/82.
- Coleman, E. "Bisexual Women and Lesbians in Heterosexual Marriage." Journal of Homosexuality 11:87-113, 1985.
- Coleman, E. (July 1986). "Sexual Compulsion vs. Sexual Addiction: The Debate Continues" (PDF). SIECUS Report. 14 (6): 7–11. Archived from the original (PDF) on 2017-08-09.
- Coleman, E. "Bisexuality: Challenging Our Understanding of Human Sexuality and Sexual Orientation." In Shelp. E.E. (ed.). Sexuality and Medicine, Vol. 1. pp. 225–242. New York: Reidel Publishing, 1987.
- Coleman, E. and Bockting, W. O. ""Heterosexual" Prior to Sex Reassignment – "Homosexual" Afterwards: A Case Study of a Female-to-Male Transsexual." Archives of Sexual Behavior 1(2): 69–82, 1988.
- Coleman, E. (1988-06-08). "Sexual Compulsivity: Definition, Etiology and Treatment Considerations". In Eli Coleman (ed.). Chemical Dependency and Intimacy Dysfunction. Routledge. ISBN 978-0866568265.
- Coleman, E. (1988-11-23). "Sexual Compulsivity: Definition, Etiology and Treatment Considerations". In Eli Coleman (ed.). Chemical Dependency and Intimacy Dysfunction. Routledge. ISBN 978-0866566407.
- Coleman, E. and Bockting, W. O. "A Comment on the Concept of Transhomosexuality, or the Dissociation of the Meaning." Archives of Sexual Behavior 20(4): 419–21, 1991.
- Coleman, E., Bockting, W. O. and Gooren, L. "Homosexual and Bisexual Identity in Sex-Reassigned Female to Male Transsexuals." Archives of Sexual Behavior 22(1): 37–50, 1993.
- Coleman, E. (2011). "Chapter 28. Impulsive/compulsive sexual behavior: Assessment and treatment". In Grant, Jon E.; Potenza, Marc N. (eds.). The Oxford Handbook of Impulse Control Disorders. New York: Oxford University Press. ISBN 9780195389715.
- Satcher D, Hook EW, III, Coleman E. Sexual Health in America: Improving Patient Care and Public Health. JAMA. 2015;314(8):765-766. doi:10.1001/jama.2015.6831.
