= Leila Weefur =

Liberian-American artist, writer, and curator (born 1989)

- Leila Weefur in 2026
- Born: 1989 (age 36–37); Oakland, California, U.S.
- Education: Howard University; California State University, Los Angeles; Mills College
- Occupations: Artist, writer, and curator
- Website: leilaweefur.com

Leila Weefur (born 1989) is a transgender Liberian American artist, writer, and curator. Their (Note: Weefur goes by he, they, and she pronouns. This article uses singular they pronouns for consistency.) work includes working with film and architecture to examine various systems of belonging, including religion, queerness and transnationalism.

== Early life and education ==
Weefur was born and raised in Oakland, California. Weefur's mother, a member of the Black Panthers, enrolled them in an all-Black elementary school, where Weefur and their classmates learned about civil rights leader Frederick Douglass and practiced Kwanzaa principles.

Weefur first began to question their gender identity at the age of 10. They were raised as a Baptist, but left the church after being baptized at the age of 15.

Weefur earned a bachelor's degree in journalism from Howard University, a bachelor's degree in film from California State University, Los Angeles, and a Master of Fine Arts from Mills College in 2016.

== Career ==
After graduating from Cal State LA, Weefur spent several years in Los Angeles working in the film industry before returning to Oakland to study fine art at Mills College.

In 2019, Weefur curated an exhibit that paired photos taken of the Black Panthers in 1968 with the work of contemporary Black artists.

Also in 2019, Weefur's video installation, "Between Beauty and Horror", explored and questioned the Black experience, and "the ways black folks often have blackness imposed on them in this very specific way".

In 2020, Weefur was one of the inaugural recipients of a California Black Voices Project grant, to showcase new work at the Minnesota Street Project galleries in San Francisco the following year. Their project, "Prey†Play", explored how they felt that belonging to the Christian Church suppressed their gender identity.

In 2020, Weefur joined the board of directors of the Letterform Archive.

In 2024, Weefur was awarded a MacDowell residency, and served as artist-in-residence for the Bemis Center for Contemporary Arts. During the residency, Weefur worked on "The Chapel of Becoming", an exhibition on the transgender body and spirituality that drew on the trans anarchitecture work of Jack Halberstam. The exhibit opened in October 2026 at The Lab in San Francisco, and included a video featuring trans community members including historian Susan Stryker.

In 2025, Weefur was appointed as an assistant professor in photo/media and new genres at the University of Washington College of Arts and Sciences. They have also worked as a lecturer at Stanford University and the University of California, Berkeley.

Weefur is a member of The Black Aesthetic, a collective founded in 2016 that curates Black visual culture.
