= The Queer Art of Failure =

2011 book by Jack Halberstam

- First edition
- Author: Jack Halberstam
- Publisher: Duke University Press
- Publication date: 2011
- Pages: 224
- ISBN: 978-0-8223-5045-3

The Queer Art of Failure is a 2011 book of queer theory by Jack Halberstam. In it, Halberstam argues that failure can be a productive way of critiquing capitalism and heteronormativity. Using examples from popular culture, such as Pixar animated films, Halberstam explores alternatives to individualism and conformity.

== Summary ==
=== Introduction: Low Theory ===
In the introduction, Halberstam proposes low theory as a way to deconstruct the normative modes of thought that have established uniform societal definitions of success and failure. Low theory is a concept Halberstam borrows from cultural theorist Stuart Hall. He uses it to undermine heteronormative definitions of success and to argue that the failure to live up to societal standards can open up more creative ways of thinking and existing in the world. Halberstam points out that queer and feminine success is always measured by male, heterosexual standards. The failure to live up to these standards, Halberstam argues, can offer unexpected pleasures such as freedom of expression and sexuality.

Halberstam clarifies his points encouraging failure in a lecture called "On Behalf of Failure": "My basic point with failure is that in a world where success is counted in relationship to profit ... or relayed through heteronormative marriage, failure is not a bad place to start for a critique of both capitalism and heteronormativity." Halberstam describes low theory as a "utility of getting lost over finding our way." Halberstam asks the reader how to avoid those heteronormative definitions of success and being that relegate other forms of knowing to redundancy and irrelevancy.

Halberstam provides several examples of publications, films and popular cultural artifacts in order to aid in explaining the concept of low theory. These include SpongeBob SquarePants, Monsters, Inc., Little Miss Sunshine, and the writings of Monique Wittig and Barbara Ehrenreich among others.

=== Chapter One: Animating Revolt and Revolting Animation ===
In the first chapter, Halberstam shows how a certain type of animated films teaches children about revolt. Halberstam says that animated films "revel in the domain of failure," and states that it is not enough for an animated film to focus on success and triumph because that is not what happens in childhood, following Kathryn Bond Stockton's "growing sideways" concept. Halberstam explains that Stockton has shown how childhood is queer in nature, but that society trains children to be heterosexual. Halberstam explains that revolt and rebellion are inherent in children, and if these traits were not, then society would have no reason to train them otherwise. According to Halberstam, animated films address the disorderly child who sees the large world beyond his controlling family.

Halberstam names this subgenre of animated films "Pixarvolt", after the animation studio Pixar. Pixarvolts make subtle and obvious connections between communist revolt and queer embodiment, and get to the root of the struggle between human and non-human creatures. Halberstam argues that although Marxist scholars have dismissed queer theory as "body politics", these films successfully show "that alternative forms of embodiment and desire are central to the struggle against corporate domination." Pixarvolt films are powered by revolution, transformation, and rebellion, and most Pixarvolt films deal with escape to utopian freedom. His examples include Toy Story and Chicken Run.

Halberstam then writes about how humans project our world onto animals, in terms of human exceptionalism, which he defines in two ways: humans thinking they are superior to and more unique than other animals, and humans using cruel forms of anthropomorphism. Halberstam considers how committed humans are to failing structures, like marriage, and how drawing on animal behavior makes humans feel as though heterosexuality is more natural or primal. Halberstam shows how March of the Penguins, like other animal documentaries, humanizes animal life and reduces animals to human standards. The film perpetuates heterosexuality by failing to acknowledge that penguins are not monogamous or to consider that penguins are not subject to human expectations. Halberstam claims, "the long march of the penguins is proof neither of heterosexuality in nature nor of the reproductive imperative nor of intelligent design."

Lastly, Halberstam talks about monstrous animations and their direct connection to the queer way of thinking. Animation creates things that are neither human nor animal. In Monsters, Inc., the corporate world relies on screams of children to power their society. This movie allows the child to stand up to their "boogeyman", and, at the same time, form an affectionate relationship with it. This bond is queer in that it lets the child control the transgression of its own boundaries.

The main difference between Halberstam's "Pixarvolt" films and regular animated movies is that other films emphasize family, human individuality, and extraordinary individuals, while Pixarvolt films focus more on collectivity, social bonding, and diverse communities, showing the importance of recognizing strangeness of bodies, sexuality and gender. "Two thematics can transform a potential Pixarvolt film into a tame and conventional cartoon: an overemphasis on nuclear family and a normative investment in coupled romance."

=== Chapter Two: Dude, Where's My Phallus? ===
In the second chapter, Halberstam highlights things such as stupidity, forgetfulness, and how they have impacted views on queer culture. The second chapter illuminates how stupidity is viewed differently in men and women, and how it can sometimes even be a gateway for the queer culture. He uses certain movies and novels where stupidity and forgetfulness are joined to actually open the door for queer individuals.

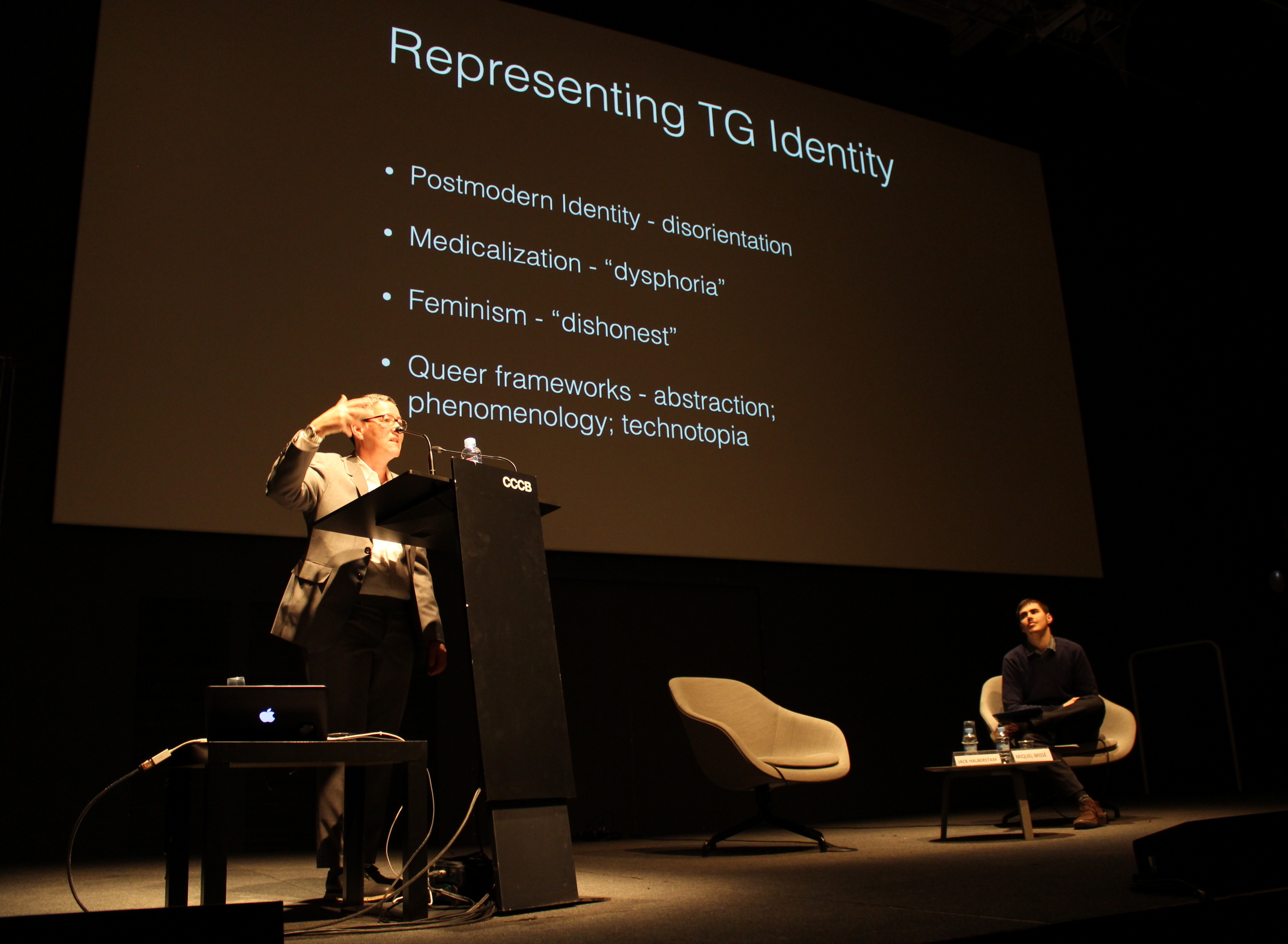
Jack Halberstam lecturing on the topic "Trans* Bodies", with Miquel Missé Sánchez sitting on the right, at CCCB (Centre de Cultura Contemporània de Barcelona), February 1, 2017

In order to establish this analysis, Halberstam defines stupidity: "Stupidity conventionally means different things in relation to different subject positions; for example, stupidity in white men can signify new modes of domination, but stupidity in women of all ethnicities inevitably symbolizes their status as, in psychoanalytic terms, "castrated" or impaired." Stupidity in women seems to be strictly looked down upon, while in men it can be seen as charming.

Halberstam shows that the film Dude, Where's My Car? is able to portray situations that would normally be uncomfortable for heterosexual white males, because of the stupidity of the main characters, Jesse and Chester. Halberstam writes that interjecting the idea of forgetting into Jesse and Chester's characters causes a queer phenomenon throughout the film. Jesse willingly knew that he was receiving a lap dance from a transsexual, but forgets the social norms that would typically accompany that. The film brought light to the gay community using stupidity and forgetfulness as a staple. Queer culture was brought to light in this film when Jesse and Chester share their convincing kiss at the end in their car next to a heterosexual couple. The stupidity of Jesse and Chester was the gateway into the kiss.

Halberstam writes that forgetting is important for queer people, who must forget social norms such as the heteronormative family in order to make way for equality. In Finding Nemo, Dory's forgetfulness brings about a queer version of selfhood, since it causes her to live in the present and forget about the past. Halberstam argues that forgetting opens up the doors for new things while suppressing negative memories, and notes the importance of forgetfulness in queer communities and how positive it can be.

=== Chapter Six: Animating Failure: Ending, Fleeing, Surviving ===
In the sixth chapter, Halberstam focuses more on the specific works of queer theory scholars, and examines works such as Finding Nemo, Monsters, Inc., and A Bug's Life. Halberstam begins by criticizing Slavoj Zizek's interpretation of Kung Fu Panda. Zizek compares the panda to George W. Bush, explaining that just like Bush, the panda rose to success because of the system, and that it was inherently tipped in his favor. Halberstam states that Kung Fu Panda "... joins new forms of animation to new conceptions of the human-animal divide to offer a very different political landscape than the one we inhabit, or at least the one Zizek imagines ..."

Halberstam goes in-depth on the complexity of animation, specifically in A Bug's Life, where a new form of "crowd scenes" were introduced. Regarding stop-motion animation works Fantastic Mr. Fox, Chicken Run, and Coraline, Halberstam explains how ideas of racism, entrapment, masculinity, political progression, remote control, and imprisonment are present. The use of stop-motion animation can help evoke different emotions as well. For example, in Chicken Run, the start-stop jerkiness allows the narrative to be even more humorous.
