= Jack Halberstam =

American academic, LGBT+ activist

- Halberstam in 2026
- Born: December 15, 1961 (age 64)
- Education: University of California, Berkeley (BA); University of Minnesota (MA, PhD)
- Known for: Queer philosophy
- Notable work: Female Masculinity; The Queer Art of Failure
- Awards: Lambda Literary Award; Judy Grahn Award

J. Jack Halberstam (/ˈhælbərstæm/; born December 15, 1961) is an American academic and author, best known for his book Female Masculinity (1998). His work focuses largely on feminism and queer and transgender identities in popular culture. Since 2017, Halberstam has been a professor in the department of English and Comparative Literature and the Institute for Research on Women, Gender, and Sexuality at Columbia University. Previously, he worked as both director and professor at The Center for Feminist Research at University of Southern California (USC). Halberstam was the associate professor in the Department of Literature at the University of California, San Diego before working at USC.

Halberstam lectures in the United States and internationally on queer failure, sex and media, subcultures, visual culture, gender variance, popular film and animation. Halberstam is currently working on several projects including a book on fascism and (homo)sexuality.

In Halberstam's most popular piece, Female Masculinity, he attacks the protected status of male masculinity, treating it not as foundational, but the least interesting of a wide number of variants. In addition, he points out the ways in which female masculinities have been pathologized. In the first full-length study of its kind, Halberstam traces the presence of female masculinities throughout history, offering it as a viable and ancient option. The text argues for a more nuanced understanding of gender categories, using examples such as "the bathroom problem" to point out every-day ways in which nonbinary people are excluded. The book was nominated for the Lambda Literary Award in Lesbian Studies in 1998 and awarded the Judy Grahn Award for Lesbian Nonfiction in 1999.

== Early life, education and gender identity ==
Halberstam is one of six children. Jack was born Judith Halberstam to father Heini Halberstam and mother Heather Peacock. The two remained married until Heather's death in a car accident in 1971. Heini died from illness in 2014 at age 87. Halberstam is Jewish, with family history in Bohemia. He earned a B.A. in English at the University of California, Berkeley in 1985, an M.A. from the University of Minnesota in 1989, and a Ph.D. from the same school in 1991.

Although Halberstam is non-specific about his gender identity, he uses the preferred name "Jack" publicly and professionally. A self-proclaimed "free floater", Halberstam has said that "Some people call me Jack, my sisters call me Jude, people I've known forever call me Judith" and "I try not to police any of it. A lot of people call me he, some people call me she, and I let it be a weird mix of things."

== Career ==
=== Female Masculinity ===
In Female Masculinity (1998), Halberstam seeks to identify what constitutes masculinity within society and the individual. The text first suggests that masculinity is a construction that promotes particular brands of male-ness while at the same time subordinating "alternative masculinities." The project specifically focuses on the ways female masculinity has been traditionally ignored in academia and society at large. To illustrate a cultural mechanism of subordinating alternative masculinities, Halberstam brings up James Bond and GoldenEye as an example, noting that gender performance in this film is far from what is traditional: M is the character who "most convincingly performs masculinity," Bond can only perform masculinity through his suave clothing and gadgets, and Q can be read "as a perfect model of the interpenetration of queer and dominant regimes." This interpretation of these characters challenges long-held ideas about what qualities create masculinity.

=== The Queer Art of Failure ===
In The Queer Art of Failure (2011), Halberstam argues that failure can be a productive way of critiquing capitalism and heteronormativity. Using examples from popular culture, like Pixar animated films, Halberstam explores alternatives to individualism and conformity. L. Ayu Saraswati calls The Queer Art of Failure "a groundbreaking book that retheorizes failure and its relationship to the process of knowledge production and being in the world."

=== Gaga Feminism ===
In Gaga Feminism, Halberstam uses Lady Gaga as a symbol for a new kind of feminism during a time in which gender and sex seem to be in crisis. The ways in which Lady Gaga and all the subsequent craziness that comes with her resonates in popular culture suggest an evolving form of gender and sexuality. Gaga feminism does not seek to prescribe a particular version of the future, but presents options. It seeks to undo the category as a whole, rather than neatly round it out. Halberstam uses contemporary pop culture examples, such as SpongeBob SquarePants, Bridesmaids, and Dory from Finding Nemo to explore what he calls the tenets of Gaga Feminism.

=== Other works ===
Halberstam speaks with Leila Weefur at a 2026 event in San Francisco

In a Queer Time and Place: Transgender Bodies, Subcultural Lives, published in 2005, looks at queer subculture, and proposes a conception of time and space independent of the influence of normative heterosexual/familial lifestyle. Halberstam coedits the book series "Perverse Modernities" with Lisa Lowe.

Trans*: A Quick and Quirky Account of Gender Variability, published in 2018, examines recent developments in the meanings of gender and gendered bodies. Through dissecting gendered language and creations of popular culture, Halberstam presents a complex view of the trans* body and its place in the modern world.

In 2020, Halberstam published Wild Things: The Disorder of Desire, which explores the colonial implications and intersections of wildness and queerness, analyzing a range of media, including The Rite of Spring, Where the Wild Things Are, Cree artist Kent Monkman's work, and Donna Haraway's writing.

== Personal life ==
In 2018, Halberstam began a relationship with scholar Macarena Gomez-Barris. Halberstam has said that he feels no pressure to marry, viewing marriage as a patriarchal institution that should not be a prerequisite for obtaining health care and deeming children "legitimate". Halberstam believes that "the couple form is failing".

== Honors and awards ==
Halberstam was awarded a Guggenheim Fellowship in 2024 for Theatre Arts and Performance Studies.

Halberstam has been nominated three times for Lambda Literary Awards, twice for the non-fiction book Female Masculinity.

Halberstam was awarded the Arcus/Places Prize in 2018 from Places Journal for innovative public scholarship on the relationship between gender, sexuality and the built environment.

In 2022, Halberstam delivered the Gifford Lectures on Collapse, Demolition, and the Queer Geographies and Unworlding: An Aesthetics of Collapse at the University of Glasgow.

== Books ==
- Halberstam, Judith (1994). The Lesbian Postmodern. New York: Columbia University Press. ISBN 978-0-231-08411-6.
- Halberstam, Judith and Ira Livingston, Eds. Posthuman Bodies. Bloomington: Indiana University Press, 1995. ISBN 0-253-32894-2 & 0253209706
- Halberstam, Judith. Skin Shows: Gothic Horror and the Technology of Monsters. Durham: Duke University Press, 1995. ISBN 0-8223-1651-X & 0822316633
- Halberstam, Judith (1998). Female Masculinity. Durham: Duke University Press. ISBN 0-8223-2226-9. LCCN 98-19527. OCLC 1088032591.
- Halberstam, Judith and Del LaGrace Volcano. The Drag King Book. London: Serpent's Tale, 1999. ISBN 1-85242-607-1
- Halberstam, Judith. In a Queer Time and Place: Transgender Bodies, Subcultural Lives. New York: New York University Press, 2005. ISBN 0-8147-3584-3 & 0814735851
- Halberstam, Judith, David Eng & José Esteban Muñoz, Eds. What's Queer about Queer Studies Now? Durham: Duke University Press, 2005. ISBN 0-8223-6621-5
- Halberstam, Judith. The Queer Art of Failure. Durham: Duke University Press, 2011. ISBN 0-8223-5045-9 & 978–0822350453
- Halberstam, J. Jack. Gaga Feminism. Boston: Beacon Press, 2012. ISBN 978-080701098-3
- Halberstam, Jack. Trans*: A Quick and Quirky Account of Gender Variability. Oakland: University of California Press, 2018. ISBN 978-0520292697
- Halberstam, Jack. Wild Things: The Disorder of Desire. Durham: Duke University Press, 2020. ISBN 978-1-4780-1108-8
- Halberstam, Jack. Anarchitecture After Everything: A Trans Manifesto. The MIT Press, 2026. ISBN 978-0-262-05242-9

== Interviews ==
- Damon R. Young, "Public Thinker: Jack Halberstam on Wildness, Anarchy, and Growing Up Punk." Public Books, March 26, 2019.
- Mathias Danbolt, "The Eccentric Archive - An Interview with Judith Halberstam" in Trikster – Nordic Queer Journal #1, 2008.
- Podcast from Critical Lede October 5, 2011
- Interview with Halberstam by Sinclair Sexsmith February 1, 2012
- Interview with Halberstam by Elizabeth Heineman on Feb 3, 2012 (archived)
