= Shannon Minter =

American civil rights attorney

- Born: Shannon Price Minter; February 14, 1961 (age 65)
- Education: University of Texas, Austin (BA); Cornell University (JD)
- Occupations: Civil rights attorney, director
- Known for: Legal Director of the National Center for LGBTQ Rights

Shannon Price Minter (born February 14, 1961) is an American civil rights attorney and the legal director of the National Center for LGBTQ Rights (formerly known as the National Center for Lesbian Rights) in San Francisco.

== Early life and education ==
Minter is a 1993 graduate of Cornell Law School and he has been lead counsel in dozens of groundbreaking legal victories for the LGBT community. Raised in East Texas, Minter began transitioning at age 35. Minter did not change his birth name after he started living as a trans man.

== Career ==
Minter first gained national attention in the United States in 2001 representing the lesbian partner of Diane Whipple, in a wrongful death case due to a dog mauling, which resulted in a landmark decision in California that extended tort claims to same-sex domestic partners; previously it was a right limited only to married couples. Marjorie Knoller was sentenced to serve 15 years to life for the death of Diane Whipple. Whipple's partner, Sharon Smith, succeeded in suing for $1,500,000 in civil damages, which she donated to Saint Mary's College of California to fund the women's lacrosse team.

In 2003, Minter gained national attention again when CourtTV aired the entire case of Kantaras v. Kantaras, where Minter represented Michael Kantaras, a transgender man who was trying to keep custody of his children. Though he won that case in 2002, it was reversed on appeal in 2004 by the Florida Supreme Court, upholding the claim that the marriage was null and void because her ex-husband was still a woman and same-sex marriages are illegal in Florida. The couple settled the case with joint custody in 2005.

In 2006, Paisley Currah, Richard M. Juang, and Minter co-edited Transgender RIghts, which was a finalist for the 2007 Lambda Award for Transgender Literature.

In 2009 Minter was the lead attorney arguing before the California Supreme Court to overturn California Proposition 8. Ken Starr represented the opposing side on this case. Ruling that California's citizens held the inalienable right to amend their constitution, the 5 for 4 majority upheld Prop 8's ban on same-sex marriages, though they agreed to recognize marriages that had already taken place under a "grandfather clause". Ultimately, the entire statute was rendered moot after the Supreme Court ruled that all states must recognize gay marriage in 2015.

Minter has taught law at UCLA School of Law, Stanford University, Golden Gate University and Santa Clara University.

=== Awards and honors ===
Minter won a Ford Foundation "Leadership for a Changing World" award in October 2005.

In April 2026, Minter was named to the TIME magazine Time 100 list of the most influential people of 2026.

== Personal life ==
Minter got married in 2001 and has a daughter. He said at the time that he was pained "by the injustice" that transgender people could legally marry in California while cisgender gay and lesbian couples could not.
