= Thomas Page McBee =

American writer and reporter (born 1981)

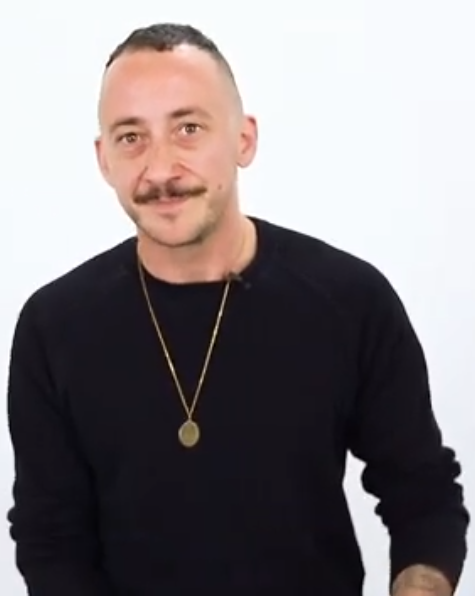
- In a 2019 interview
- Born: 1981 (age 44–45); Hickory, North Carolina, US
- Occupations: Writer, boxer
- Spouse: Jessica Bloom
- Website: www.thomaspagemcbee.com

Thomas Page McBee (born 1981) is an American transgender journalist, television writer, and amateur boxer. He was the first transgender man to box in Madison Square Garden, which he discusses in Amateur. His first book, Man Alive, won a Lambda Literary Award for Transgender Nonfiction.

== Personal life ==
McBee was born in Hickory, North Carolina, in 1981 and grew up outside of Pittsburgh.

McBee has noted that he "knew [he] wasn't a girl before [he] knew much of anything." However, he also did not resonate with men's "jockeying power dynamics or aversion to hugs." In his late-twenties, he realized that although he "didn't connect with the cultural expectations of Being a Man, [he] knew that [he]'d grown up and become one." He began hormone replacement therapy when he was 30 years old and at 31, he received a new birth certificate from North Carolina Vital Records, an experience he described as feeling like he had been "born again".

As of 2022, McBee lived in Los Angeles with his wife, Jessica Bloom.

== Career ==
Aside from writing, McBee was a senior editor at Quartz and taught at City University of New York. He has also served as an advisor at West Virginia University's Graduate School of Journalism.

== Writing ==
McBee has written regular columns in The Rumpus ("Self-Made Man"), Them ("Amateur"), Bitch, Pacific Standard ("The American Man"), and Teen Vogue. His writing has also appeared in The New York Times, T Magazine, Esquire, GQ, Glamour, Playboy, The Atlantic, VICE, and other publications.

=== Television ===
In 2019 and 2020, McBee wrote episodes for Netflix's Tales of the City and Showtime's The L Word: Generation Q. He has also appeared on the documentary film No Ordinary Man and the mini-series The Art of Intersection.

In 2021, McBee was a supervising producer on The Umbrella Academy, where he architected a storyline in which Elliot Page's character transitions to male, mirroring the actor's real-world transition. In 2022, he served as a writer and co-producer on the fourth season of The Umbrella Academy. He is currently developing several film and television projects, including a television adaptation for Amateur.

=== Man Alive (2014) ===
Man Alive: A True Story of Violence, Forgiveness and Becoming a Man was published September 9, 2014, by City Lights Publishers. The book received starred reviews from Publishers Weekly, Kirkus Reviews, Lambda Literary Foundation, and Library Journal. Man Alive won a Lambda Literary Award for Transgender Nonfiction.

=== Amateur (2018) ===
Amateur: A True Story About What Makes a Man was published August 14, 2018, by Scribner. The book received a starred review from Publishers Weekly, as well as positive reviews from Kirkus, The New Republic, BuzzFeed, Booklist, The Rumpus, The Guardian, Los Angeles Review of Books, and Shelf Awareness. Amateur was a finalist for a Lambda Literary Award for Transgender Nonfiction, nominated for The Baillie Gifford Prize for Non-Fiction, and shortlisted for the Wellcome Book Prize.

== Awards ==
Year	Work	Award	Result	Ref.
2014	Man Alive	Lambda Literary Award for Transgender Nonfiction	Winner	
2015	Man Alive	American Library Association Over the Rainbow Project List	Top 10	
2018	Amateur	The Baillie Gifford Prize for Non-Fiction	Shortlist	
2019	Amateur	Lambda Literary Award for Transgender Nonfiction	Finalist	
2019	Amateur	Wellcome Book Prize	Shortlist	
