= Please Miss =

2022 autobiography by Grace Lavery

- Author: Grace Elisabeth Lavery
- Language: English
- Subject: Transitioning and the trans experience
- Genre: Memoir; autobiography; Transgender literature
- Publisher: Seal Press
- Publication date: February 2022
- Pages: 304
- ISBN: 978-1-5416-2065-0
- Website: http://www.gracelavery.org/please-miss/

Please Miss: A Heartbreaking Work of Staggering Penis is a February 2022 autobiography by professor Grace Elisabeth Lavery and published by Seal Press. It chronicles her transition and her past troubles with addiction, while also ruminating on sexually charged absurdist material and tall tales regarding the "paradigmatic concept of the penis".

Started in 2018, the book discusses how transitioning while reaching tenure as a professor impacted her outlook on life, with the content being disjointed in topic and theme from chapter to chapter. Lavery wanted a more metaphorical outlook on the subject and, to that end, one of the most noted features in the book is a series of unhinged letters from aggressive clowns that represents various negative personas and concepts.

The work was well received by critics, who praised how accurately it manages to portray the trans experience through metaphor and concept, though some noted that its approach made it difficult for some concepts to come across to readers not personally involved with or knowledgeable on the subject matter.

== Background ==
Lavery stated that, despite the book being an autobiography that she has essentially been writing all her life, the origin point for the actual book was after she started to transition in 2018. This coincided with her tenure application occurring at the University of California, Berkeley. The two events happening simultaneously created a juxtaposition that resulted in her writing down her experiences. How to express this, particularly in relation to issues involving the Trump administration, resulted in the format of the book where multiple methods of expression are used. She stated that her method of devising the book involved it being entirely written on the "notes app of her phone" in small portions over an extended period of time.

== Content ==
The book opens with a discussion between Lavery and her partner Daniel M. Lavery on whether a memoir is the right method to discuss contemporary trans life, with the conversation continuing into topics on what the limits are of different literary genres and whether trans experiences need to be entirely lived to be included in an autobiography. Lavery argues that no one work could encompass the whole of experiences for the trans community, but that an absurdist work that covers a wide range of subjects could better express her purpose. She noted in an interview that writing a memoir that just straightforwardly presented facts about her life would be less informative than representing metaphorical experiences, though she also pointed out that chapter four is written more directly as a juxtaposition to the rest of the book before and after it in order to make the reader unsettled about the "intimate disclosure" in the chapter.

A series of maniacal and confrontational letters are featured throughout the work that are written by clowns and addressed to the author, with the clowns featuring "someone who doesn’t take themselves seriously but who also is horrifying" and representing a variety of potential problems including "a bad trans woman or the idea of gender dysphoria" and "a monstrous, extreme representation of whiteness".

The book is dedicated to Lavery's mother and frequently discusses her, their relationship, and Lavery's life experiences with her family.

== Critical reception ==
Them magazine's Daniel Spielberger said that the book "blends surrealist autofiction with literary theory, resulting in a complex, multi-layered work that’s as puzzling as it is enchanting." Katie Tobin for Dazed magazine stated that the central question raised in Please Miss is "What does it truly mean to transition?" and that the book covers this by being "meditations on sex, gender, and pop culture with a bold vulgarity and dazzling wit". Barry Pierce in The Irish Times complimented Lavery's use of metaphor in relation to trans identity, whose "result is an untamed beast, a vast scrapbook of lengthy asides, harrowing recollections and literary analysis". Also that the book's "structural messiness and lack of a narrative flow" manages to be perfectly representative of the topic discussed, resulting in a "weird and wonderful work". Sarah Ditum writing for The Times referred to the book as a "tiresome, taboo-trashing trans memoir". The Herald reviewer Alastair Mabbott noted that the readers who can follow the "academic trains of thought" presented in the book will be able to gain the most insight, but that everyone else might be tired from Lavery's "scattershot energy and breathless narration", though they would also be "unable to deny that she’s shattered expectations with an inventive and provocative memoir".

For Library Journal, Emily Bowles pointed out that the book's "collected essays, letters, humorous anecdotes, and self-reflections play with form and genre and defy boundaries", resulting in a work that despite being simply a memoir manages to "riotously disrupt generic conventions and brings readers along for the ride". Liber magazine's McKenzie Wark had mixed feelings about the book, feeling that the over the top nature of the book falls flat in its attempts to distance itself from trans culture as a whole, but manages to be extremely accurate toward the trans experience at various points. She concluded that the book "occupies a position marked out for us by our enemies to laugh at, does an astonishing trick or two—and a pratfall" and that the book is "sacrificial" in its extravagance, but Wark "love[s] her for that". Andreas Copes in Philadelphia Gay News called the book a "perfect metaphor for trans existence" because questions about the book's "validity" matches questioning of the existence of trans individuals themselves, resulting in a work that teaches a "lesson of self-love and self-hate, of friendship and family, and why there’s no better way to start hormonal therapy than in a Honda, taking in the soundtrack of Kate Bush". Vicky Osterweil for Lux Magazine contended that Please Miss manages to "remind us that queer struggle can be funny, joyous, and sexy, and sometimes the best response to TERFs is a cackle".
