= Dean Spade =

Lawyer, writer and transgender activist

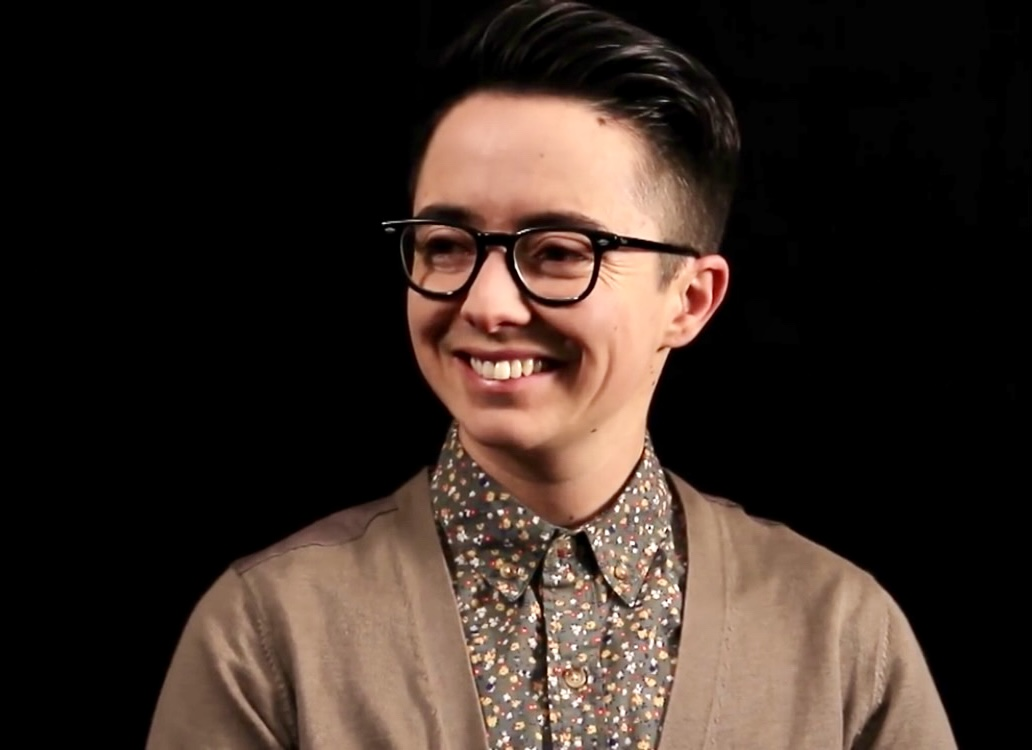
- Spade in 2015
- Born: 1977 (age 48–49)
- Education: Barnard College (BA); University of California, Los Angeles (JD)
- Occupations: Lawyer, activist, writer, professor
- Employer: Seattle University School of Law
- Known for: Transgender activism
- Website: Official website

Dean Spade (born 1977) is an American lawyer, transgender activist, writer, and associate professor of law at Seattle University School of Law. Since graduating from UCLA School of Law in 2001, he has organized a number of activist projects such as the Sylvia Rivera Law Project, a non-profit providing free legal services to genderqueer marginalized groups in New York City. Spade entered academia as the 2009–2010 Haywood Burns Chair at CUNY School of Law, followed by his role as the Williams Institute Law Teaching Fellow at UCLA Law School and Harvard Law School. Throughout his career, he has written numerous articles, books, papers, and zines, and has also directed a documentary titled Pinkwashing Exposed: Seattle Fights Back!.

== Early life and education ==
Spade grew up in rural Virginia, the child of a single mother who had often relied on welfare. At the age of 9, he joined his mother and sister in cleaning houses and offices to make money. Two years later, he started cleaning by himself, getting a summer job between grades six and seven to clean and paint rental apartments for additional income. His mother died of lung cancer when he was 14. Following her death, he lived with two sets of foster parents.

Spade graduated from Barnard College with a Bachelor of Arts degree in political science and women's studies, and then graduated from the UCLA School of Law in 2001. He has written about seeking a mastectomy as gender-affirming surgery in Los Angeles during this time period, and how the reliance on a mental-health/disability model to gain access to such surgery did not fit a person with a non-binary gender expression.

== Career ==
=== Activism ===
In 2002, Spade founded the Sylvia Rivera Law Project (SRLP), a non-profit law collective in New York City that provides free legal services to transgender, intersex and gender non-conforming people who are low-income and/or people of color. He was a staff attorney at SRLP from 2002 to 2006, when he presented testimony to the National Prison Rape Elimination Commission and helped achieve a major victory for transgender youth in foster care in the Jean Doe v. Bell case.

Spade directed the 2015 documentary Pinkwashing Exposed: Seattle Fights Back!, about a movement in Seattle pushing back against a pinkwashing tour funded by the Israeli consulate. Spade has worked with the Seattle chapter of Queers Against Israeli Apartheid.

Since 2012, Spade has been involved with the No New Youth Jail campaign in order to stop the building of a new jail in Seattle. The campaign shifted its focus to closing the jail once it opened in late 2019, and in 2020 the county announced plans to close the jail by 2025. However, in 2024 this pledge was abandoned and legislation was introduced to keep the jail open indefinitely.

=== Academia ===
Spade's academic career began when he was nominated to the 2009 Haywood Burns Chair at CUNY School of Law. He was later the Williams Institute Law Teaching Fellow at the UCLA Law School and Harvard Law School and was selected to give the 2009–2010 James A. Thomas Lecture at Yale Law School. Spade has written extensively about his personal experience as a trans law professor and student. This includes writings on transphobia in higher education, as well as on the class privilege of being a professor. He has also written about the limitations of the law's ability to address issues of inequity and injustice. In 2009, he received a Jesse Dukeminier Award for his article "Documenting Gender". In May 2010,The Advocate named Spade one of their "Forty Under 40".

Spade's research interests have included the impact of the war on terror on transgender rights, the bureaucratization of trans identities, models of non-profit governance in social movements, and the limits of enhanced hate crime penalties. His first book, Normal Life: Administrative Violence, Critical Trans Politics, and the Limits of Law, was released in January 2012 from South End Press and nominated as a finalist for the 24th Lambda Literary Award for Transgender Literature. His second book, Mutual Aid: Building Solidarity During This Crisis (and the Next), was published in October 2020 through Verso Books. His third book, Love in a F*cked-Up World: How to Build Relationships, Hook Up, and Raise Hell Together, was published by Algonquin Books in January 2025. Spade has also written a zine titled Piss and Vinegar (2002), telling the story of his transphobic arrest along with sociologist Craig Willse during the 2002 World Economic Forum protests in New York City. Mimi Nguyen interviewed Spade and Willse about the experience in Maximumrocknroll.

=== Collaborations ===
Spade edited two special issues of Sexuality Research and Social Policy with Paisley Currah and co-authored a guide to Medical Therapy and Health Maintenance for Transgender Men with R. Nick Gorton and Jamie Buth. Spade has worked frequently with Craig Willse, their collaborative projects including I Still Think Marriage is the Wrong Goal, which is a manifesto and Facebook group. Willse and Spade were also the co-creators of MAKE, both a paper zine from 1999–2001 and website from 2001–2007. In 2009, Utne Reader named Spade and Tyrone Boucher on their list of "50 Visionaries Who Are Changing Your World" for their collaborative project Enough: The Personal Politics of Resisting Capitalism.

== Selected Works ==
- "Resisting medicine, re/modeling gender". Berkeley Women's Law Journal. 18 (1): 15–39. 2003.
- "Documenting Gender". Hastings Law Journal. 59 (4): 731–842. 2008.
- "Mutilating Gender". The Transgender Studies Reader. Taylor & Francis. 2006. pp. 315–332. ISBN 9780415947091.
- Normal Life: Administrative Violence, Critical Trans Politics, and the Limits of Law. New York: South End Press. 2011. ISBN 9780896087965. OCLC 601132754.
- Mutual Aid: Building Solidarity During this Crisis (and the next). New York: Verso Books. 2020. ISBN 9781839762123.
- "Solidarity Not Charity". Social Text. 38 (1): 131–151. 2020. doi:10.1215/01642472-7971139.
- Love in a F*cked-Up World: How to Build Relationships, Hook Up, and Raise Hell Together. New York: Algonquin Books. 2025. ISBN 9781643756462.
