= Grace Lavery =

British-American writer and academic

- Lavery in 2026
- Born: 1983 or 1984 (age 42–43); Birmingham, England
- Education: University of Pennsylvania; University of Oxford; University of Sussex
- Spouse: Daniel M. Lavery (m. 2019)
- Children: 1
- Website: www.gracelavery.org

Grace Elisabeth Lavery (born March 17, 1983) is a British-American writer and academic who is a professor of English, critical theory and gender and women's studies at the University of California, Berkeley, whose research focuses on the history of language and aestheticism in 19th century Victorian English society, along with topics involving the language and literature of sexuality and gender.

== Early life and education ==
Lavery was born in Birmingham, England. She graduated from the University of Oxford and the University of Sussex. Under advisor Paul Saint-Amour, she completed her English Ph.D. from the University of Pennsylvania in 2013, with a thesis titled "Empire in a Glass Case: Japanese Beauty, British Culture, and Transnational Aestheticism".

== Career ==
As a first publication, Lavery released Quaint, Exquisite in 2019 on a subject connected to her post-doctoral research: Victorian era sensibilities in relation to Japan as viewed through a queer theory lens. One major focus of the book is how the idea of orientalism colored English understanding of Japan as the "Other Empire". A 2022 memoir titled Please Miss was her second published book and covered a wide range of topics beyond her own life and background. An introspection on being trans through a wide variety of genres and non-sequitur asides, the book psychoanalyzes the trans experience and aspects of life that represent it.

Lavery's third book, Pleasure and Efficacy, was released in 2023 and discussed the meaning of being transgender and how transitioning works in relation to how the topic is discussed in various genres of literature. The book also includes philosophical views of writers from the 19th century and discussions of how understanding of "transness" is complicated and nuanced, unlike how transition is commonly portrayed. Pleasure and Efficacy was announced as a finalist for the 2024 National Book Critics Circle Award for Criticism. In 2024, Closures, her fourth book, was published on the topic of the American sitcom and its usage of heterosexuality to define the nuclear family and cause conflict and issues that reinforce the scenario. Lavery explains how the storylines in sitcoms use "external agents" to create strife that ultimately promotes the heteronormativity seen in the nuclear family value system.

She received a $125,000 advance from Substack to publish a newsletter on their platform.

== Personal life ==
In 2018, Lavery officially began transitioning and noted in later interviews that she was happy to have done so before the publication of her first book and her bid for tenure, as it allowed her to enter the academic space with her chosen name.

Lavery married Daniel M. Lavery in 2019 and they moved from California to New York. In 2020, they formed a throuple with Lily Woodruff and they had a son in 2024.

== Bibliography ==
- — (26 January 2024). Closures: Heterosexuality and the American Sitcom. Duke University Press. p. 128. ISBN 9781478059134.
- — (30 May 2023). Pleasure and Efficacy: Of Pen Names, Cover Versions, and Other Trans Techniques. Princeton University Press. p. 304. ISBN 9780691243931.
- — (8 February 2022). Please Miss: A Heartbreaking Work of Staggering Penis. Basic Books. p. 174. ISBN 9781541620643.
- — (28 May 2019). Quaint, Exquisite: Victorian Aesthetics and the Idea of Japan. Princeton University Press. p. 219. ISBN 9780691183626.
