= Transgender Studies Quarterly =

- Discipline: Transgender studies
- Language: English
- Edited by: Susan Stryker, Francisco J. Galarte, Jules Gill-Peterson, Grace Lavery, and Abraham B. Weil

Publication details
- History: 2014–present
- Publisher: Duke University Press (United States)
- Frequency: Quarterly

Standard abbreviations
- ISO 4: Transgender Stud. Q.

Indexing
- ISSN: 2328-9252 (print); 2328-9260 (web)
- LCCN: 2013201233
- OCLC no.: 945577457

Links
- Journal homepage; Online access; Online archive

TSQ: Transgender Studies Quarterly is a quarterly peer-reviewed academic journal covering transgender studies, with an emphasis on cultural studies and the humanities. Established in 2014 and published by Duke University Press, it is the first non-medical journal about transgender studies.

The founding editors-in-chief are Susan Stryker (University of Arizona) and Paisley Currah (Brooklyn College and Graduate Center, CUNY). Currah left his role as co-editor in 2019, and Francisco J. Galarte became co-general editor. At the time, Galarte was an assistant professor of gender and women's studies at the University of Arizona. He had worked with the journal since 2011, and served as fashion editor from 2012 to 2018.

== Inception ==
While co-editing a special transgender studies issue of Women's Studies Quarterly in 2008, Susan Stryker and Paisley Currah recognized the need for a publication dedicated to the topic: They received more than 200 submissions, but were only able to publish 12.

In May 2013, they started a month-long Kickstarter campaign to help fund Transgender Studies Quarterly. They received more than US$10,000 in donations in the first five days; by the end of the campaign, the journal had nearly $25,000 in crowdfunded capital.

The first call for submissions drew a considerable amount of interest. The editors received so many submissions, they expanded the first issue into a book-length double issue containing 86 essays. The title of the first issue, "Postposttranssexual", alludes to Sandy Stone's 1987 article "The Empire Strikes Back: A Posttranssexual Manifesto", which has been called the start of transgender studies. Each essay in this issue focuses on key concepts within transgender studies.

== Scope and content ==
In the introduction to the first issue, Currah and Stryker announce that they intend the journal to be a gathering place for different ideas within the field of transgender studies, and affirm that they embrace multiple definitions of transgender.

Most issues of TSQ have a theme. Among the themes of past issues are Trans Futures (November 2019), Trans-in-Asia (August 2018), "Trans/Feminisms" (May 2016), and the Issue of Blackness (May 2017).

== See also ==
- International Journal of Transgender Health
- List of transgender publications
