= Paisley Currah =

Political scientist and author

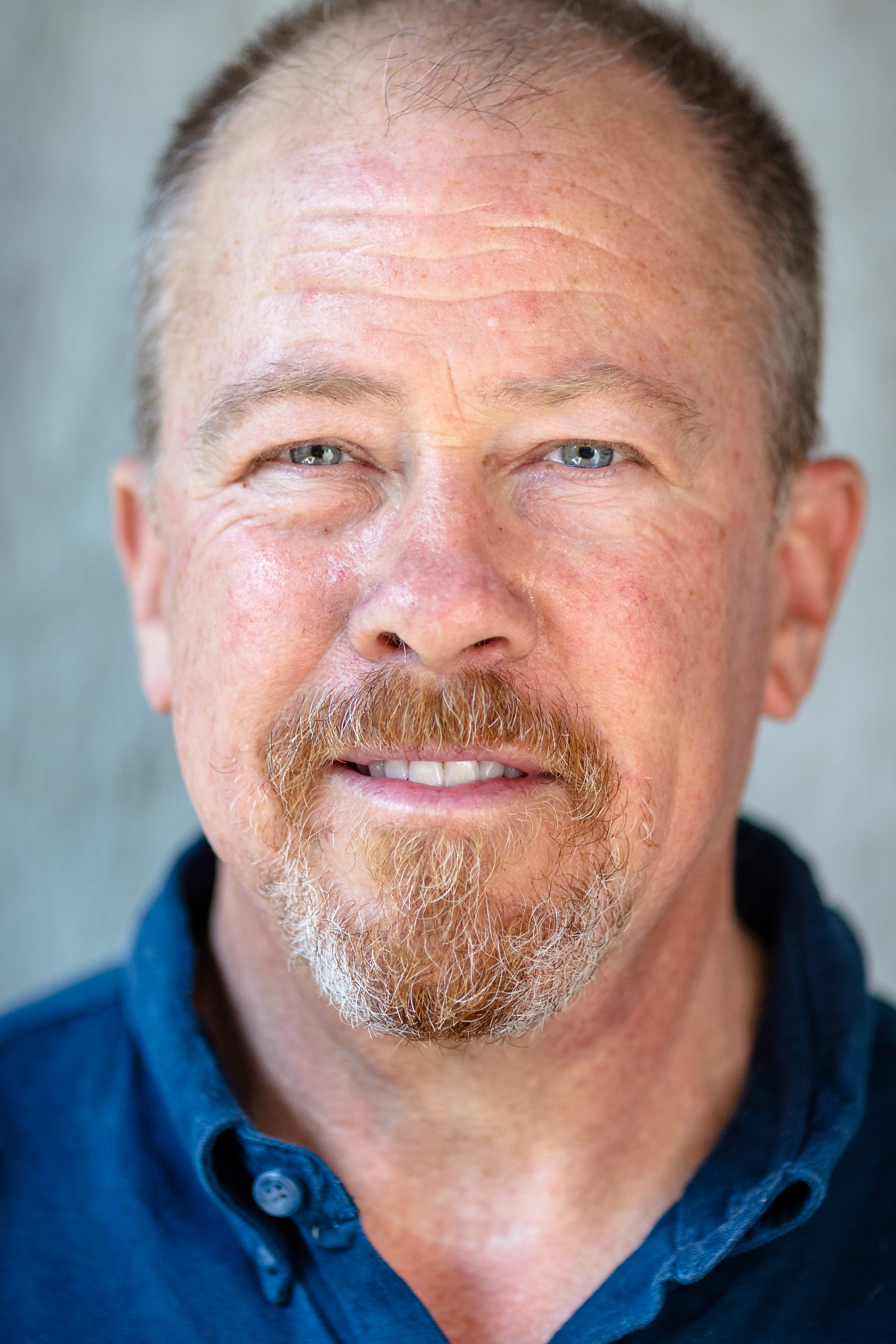
- Born: Ontario, Canada
- Occupations: Professor, writer, editor
- Board member of: Transgender Studies Quarterly

Academic background
- Education: Cornell University; Queen's University

Academic work
- Institutions: Brooklyn College

Paisley Currah is a political scientist and author whose work in transgender studies examines the politics of sex classification by governments. His book, Sex Is as Sex Does: Governing Transgender Identity (NYU Press, 2022) argues that sex classification as a technology of governance-a legal and administrative instrument that states deploy to achieve regulatory ends rather than to reflect biological fact. He is Distinguished Professor of Political Science and Women's and Gender Studies at Brooklyn College and the Graduate Center of the City University of New York and a co-founding editor of TSQ: Transgender Studies Quarterly, the first peer-reviewed academic journal devoted to transgender studies. His current work situates anti-trans legislation within a longer history of sex classification and its relationship to reproductive governance and democratic politics. He was born in Ontario, Canada, received a B.A. (Hons, First Class) from Queen's University at Kingston, Ontario and an M.A and Ph.D. in government from Cornell University. He lives in Brooklyn.

== Research ==
Currah writes about transgender people and the law and is a leading authority on the politics of sex classification. He is the founding editor, with Susan Stryker, of TSQ: Transgender Studies Quarterly, the first non-medical academic journal devoted to transgender issues, which began publication in 2014. When the journal first launched, Currah told Inside Higher Education: "Starting the journal was exciting but kind of daunting. For a long time, there have been a lot of articles and book-length treatments of transgender topics. One of the ideas behind TSQ was to draw readers' attention to how much work there is being done in the field." Currah is now Editor Emeritus of TSQ.

Currah's book, Sex Is as Sex Does: Governing Transgender Identity, reveals the hidden logics that have governed sex classification policies in the United States and shows what the regulation of transgender identity can tell us about society's approach to sex and gender writ large. In 2021, an article summarizing some of the book's main arguments, "The Work that Sex Does", was published in a collection, Intimate States: Gender, Sexuality, and Governance in Modern U.S. History, edited by Margot Canaday, Nancy F. Cott, and Robert O. Self and published by the University of Chicago Press. He co-edited, with Shannon Minter and Richard Juang, Transgender Rights, (Minnesota University Press, 2006) which won the Sylvia Rivera Award in Transgender Studies and was a finalist for the 2007 Lambda Literary Awards in the Transgender category. With Monica J. Casper, Currah co-edited Corpus: An Interdisciplinary Reader on Bodies and Knowledge, (Palgrave, 2011). Currah is a recipient of the Wayne F. Placek Award from the American Psychological Foundation.

== Public writing and media ==
Currah is regularly interviewed and published in mainstream media. He wrote "Donald Trump's War on Gender Is Also a War on Government" for The New Yorker (May 2025) and "The Anti-Trans Playbook" for The New York Review of Books (December 2025), arguing that anti-trans legislation dismantles legal architecture built to protect all women. He was quoted in The New York Times on the Supreme Court's consideration of transgender passport policies (November 2025). Earlier pieces include an interview in Time on actor Elliot Page discussing "visibility gaps" faced by transmasculine people in the media, and commentary on NPR's 1A following the Supreme Court's 2020 Bostock decision. Other publications include a piece on transgender policy and evidence in Nature (2022) and "The Gender Wars" in The Yale Review (2024).

== Public policy and transgender rights advocacy ==
As a founding board member of the Transgender Law and Policy Institute, Currah has advocated for transgender rights at all levels of government. He also served on the board of directors Global Action for Trans Equality (GATE) from 2011 to 2017. He served on the advisory board of Human Rights Watch Lesbian, Gay, Bisexual, and Transgender Rights Program. From January 2005–December 2006, he sat on the External Advisory Committee to the New York City Department of Health and Mental Hygiene for the Amendment of Birth Certificates for Transgender Persons. From November 2004 to December 2005, he served on the Citizen's Advisory Committee Transgender Subcommittee, New York City Human Resources Administration and in that capacity was a co-author of "Recommended Best Practices for Working With and Serving Transgender and Gender Non-Conforming Employees and Clients." He was a co-founder of the New York Association for Gender Rights Advocacy, and helped draft the legislation to amend the New York City Human Rights Law to include discrimination based on gender identity and gender expression.

== Academic affiliations ==
For the 2024–2025 academic year, Currah was a member at the Institute for Advanced Study in Princeton. Currah is professor of political science and women's and gender studies at Brooklyn College and the Graduate Center of the City University of New York. He served as the chair of the Department of Political Science from 2011 to 2014. He served as the executive director of the Center for Lesbian and Gay Studies at the City University of New York from 2003 to 2007.

Currah serves or has served on the editorial boards of GLQ: A Journal of Lesbian and Gay Studies, Women's Studies Quarterly, the American Political Science Review, and Polity. His service on advisory boards has included: LGBT Social Science and Public Policy Center at Hunter College; Sexuality and the Law, Social Science Research Network; International Resource Network, a project hosted at the Center for Lesbian and Gay Studies and funded by the Ford Foundation; the University Consortium on Sexuality Research and Training. He served as a visiting adjunct professor for the Columbia University Institute for the Study of Human Rights and the Women's and Gender Studies Program at Barnard College between 2009 and 2023.

== Selected works ==
- Currah, Paisley (2025.) "The Anti-Trans Playbook," New York Review of Books, December 18, 2025.
- Currah, Paisley (2025.) "Donald Trump's War on Gender is Also a War on Government," The New Yorker, May 27, 2025.
- Currah, Paisley (2025.) "High Court Must Acknowledge US History of Anti-Trans Laws," Law 360, February 25, 2025.
- Currah, Paisley (2025.) "Full-Throated, Explicit Dehumanization," nplus1 magazine, February 10, 2025.
- Currah, Paisley (2024.) "The Return of Trump IV." The New York Review of Books, November 11, 2024.
- Currah, Paisley (2024). "The Gender Wars." The Yale Review, March 4, 2024.
- Currah, Paisley (2022). Sex Is as Sex Does: Governing Transgender Identity. NYU Press. ISBN 978-1-4798-1202-8. 2024 Paperback, with a new foreword, ISBN 978-0-8147-1709-7.
- Currah, Paisley (27 September 2022). "To set transgender policy, look to the evidence". Nature. 609 (7929): 877. Bibcode:2022Natur.609..877C. doi:10.1038/d41586-022-03036-5. PMID 36167998. S2CID 252538587.
- Fischel, Joseph J.; Currah, Paisley; Gross, Aeyal (20 April 2019). "Social Justice for Gender and Sexual Minorities: A Discussion with Paisley Currah and Aeyal Gross". Critical Analysis of Law. 6 (1). doi:10.33137/cal.v6i1.32565.
- Currah, Paisley (18 May 2017). "Transgender Rights without a Theory of Gender?". Tulsa Law Review. 52 (3): 441.
- Brettschneider, Marla; Burgess, Susan; Keating, Christine (2017). LGBTQ Politics: A Critical Reader. NYU Press. ISBN 978-1-4798-0017-9.
- Moore, Lisa Jean; Currah, Paisley (2015). "Birth/Sex/Time/Bodies: Negotiating Gender Permanence in the New York City Birth Certificate Policy". In Dubrofsky, Rachel; Magnet, Shoshana (eds.). Feminist Surveillance Studies. Durham, NC: Duke University Press. pp. 58–77.
- Currah, Paisley; Moore, Lisa Jean (December 2008). "'We Won't Know Who You Are': Contesting Sex Designations in New York City Birth Certificates". Hypatia. 24 (3): 113–135. doi:10.1111/j.1527-2001.2009.01048.x. S2CID 144697804.
- Currah, Paisley; Stryker, Susan (2015). "Introduction". TSQ: Transgender Studies Quarterly. 2 (1): 1–12. doi:10.1215/23289252-2848859.
- Stryker, Susan; Currah, Paisley (2014). "Introduction". TSQ: Transgender Studies Quarterly. 1 (1–2): 1–18. doi:10.1215/23289252-2398540.
- Currah, Paisley (2013). "Homonationalism, State Rationalities, and Sex Contradictions". Theory & Event. 16 (1). Project MUSE 501864.
- Currah, Paisley (2013). "Gender Pluralisms Under the Transgender Umbrella". In Goldberd, Suzanne (ed.). Essays on Equality and Anti-Discrimination Law. London: Ashgate Press. Originally published in Currah, Paisley; Juang, Richard M.; Minter, Shannon Price, eds. (2006). Transgender Rights. Minneapolis: Minnesota University Press. pp. 3–31.
- Currah, Paisley; Mulqueen, Tara (June 2011). "Securitizing Gender: Identity, Biometrics, and Transgender Bodies at the Airport". Social Research: An International Quarterly. 78 (2): 557–582. doi:10.1353/sor.2011.0030. JSTOR 23347190.
- Currah, Paisley (Spring 2003). "The Transgender Rights Imaginary". Georgetown Journal of Gender and the Law. 4 (2): 705–720.
- Currah, Paisley; Juang, Richard M.; Minter, Shannon (2006). Transgender Rights. University of Minnesota Press. ISBN 978-0-8166-4312-7.
