= Man Alive (book) =

2014 book by Thomas Page McBee

Man Alive: A True Story of Violence, Forgiveness and Becoming a Man
- Author: Thomas Page McBee
- Language: English
- Genre: Memoir
- Publisher: City Lights Publishers
- Publication date: September 9, 2014
- Publication place: United States
- Media type: Print
- Awards: Lambda Literary Award for Transgender Nonfiction
- ISBN: 9780872866249

Man Alive: A True Story of Violence, Forgiveness and Becoming a Man is a nonfiction book by Thomas Page McBee, published September 8, 2014, by City Lights Publishers. The book centres on the question "What does it really mean to be a man?" as McBee shares his negative experiences with masculinity, including childhood abuse and a mugging, both perpetrated by men.

In 2014, the book won a Lambda Literary Award for Transgender Nonfiction.

== Reception ==
Man Alive received starred reviews from Publishers Weekly, Kirkus Reviews, Lambda Literary Foundation, and Library Journal.

Publishers Weekly noted, "McBee’s lyrical, achingly honest exploration of loss and maturation offers a hopeful antidote to more toxic forms of masculinity."

Kirkus called the book "quite a story, masterfully rendered."

Publishers Weekly, NPR, and Kirkus named Man Alive one of the best nonfiction books of 2014. Advocate included it in their list of the 10 best transgender nonfiction books of the year.

Awards for Man Alive
Year	Award	Result	Ref.
2015	American Library Association Over the Rainbow Project List	Top 10	
2014	Lambda Literary Award for Transgender Nonfiction	Winner	
