= International Journal of Transgender Health =

- Discipline: Sexology
- Language: English
- Edited by: Damien Riggs

Publication details
- Former name: International Journal of Transgenderism
- History: 1997–present
- Publisher: Taylor & Francis
- Frequency: Quarterly
- Open access: Hybrid
- Impact factor: 8.4 (2025)

Standard abbreviations
- ISO 4: Int. J. Transgend. Health

Indexing
- ISSN: 2689-5269 (print); 2689-5277 (web)
- LCCN: 2019202035
- OCLC no.: 1127649197
- International Journal of Transgenderism
- ISSN: 1553-2739 (print); 1434-4599 (web)

Links
- Journal homepage; Current issue; List of issues; Pre-2003 archive

The International Journal of Transgender Health (IJTH) is a quarterly peer-reviewed academic journal covering research on gender dysphoria and gender incongruence, the medical treatment of transgender individuals, social and legal acceptance of gender-affirming surgery, and professional and public education on transgender health. It also publishes the Standards of Care for the Health of Transgender and Gender Diverse People on behalf of the World Professional Association for Transgender Health (WPATH) of which it is the official journal, guest editorials, policy statements, letters to the editor, and review articles. The journal is published by Taylor & Francis and the editor-in-chief is Damien Riggs (Flinders University).

== Abstracting and indexing ==
The journal is abstracted and indexed in CINAHL, the Directory of Open Access Journals, EBSCO databases, PsycINFO, Science Citation Index Expanded, Scopus, and the Social Sciences Citation Index. The journal has a 2025 impact factor of 8.4.

== History ==
The journal was established in 1997 as the International Journal of Transgenderism, obtaining its current title in 2020, to reflect more “appropriate and acceptable language in the field”, pointing out that language in the field constantly evolves, and new terms being used “according to the degree to which it embraces a respectful, nonpathologizing, human rights–based perspective.” with Friedemann Pfäfflin and Eli Coleman as founding editors-in-chief.

=== Past editors ===
The following persons have been editor-in-chief of the journal:

- Friedemann Pfäfflin (University of Ulm)
- Eli Coleman (University of Minnesota Medical School)
- Richard Ekins (University of Ulster)
- Dave King (University of Liverpool)
- Walter O. Bockting (Columbia University)
- Walter Pierre Bouman (National Centre for Transgender Health and the University of Nottingham)

== See also ==
- Transgender Studies Quarterly
