= Rupert Raj =

Canadian transgender activist

- Born: 1952 (age 73–74); Ottawa, Ontario, Canada
- Other name: Nicholas Christopher Ghosh
- Known for: Trans rights activism; Trans-focused clinical research; Trans-positive professional training

Rupert Raj (born 1952) is a Canadian transgender activist. He transitioned in 1971. His work since then has received several awards and he has included in the National Portrait Collection of The ArQuives.

== Life ==
Raj was born in Ottawa, Ontario in 1952. His father was East Indian and his mother Polish; they met in Stockholm, where Raj's father, Amal Chandra Ghosh, worked as a nuclear physicist. After the birth of their first child, the family moved to Ottawa, Canada, where Ghosh took up a position as a professor of physics at Carleton University. Both parents were killed in a car accident in August 1968, when Raj was sixteen, and the five children (three brothers and one sister) moved into four different homes until they respectively reached 18 or 21 years of age.

In 1971, at age 19, Raj scheduled an appointment with the Harry Benjamin Foundation's endocrinologist, Charles Ihlenfeld. Since Raj was not yet 21, the age of majority in New York, his older brother provided consent. Ihlenfeld examined Raj and administered his first shot of testosterone.

Raj graduated with a Bachelor of Arts in psychology from Carleton University in 1975, and moved to Vancouver, British Columbia, following two friends, both trans women activists who had been involved in the Association of Canadian Transsexuals (ACT) in Toronto. Raj continued his activism, starting a petition to get Ontario to cover sex-reassignment surgery through the Ontario Health Insurance Plan—an effort that was unsuccessful at the time.

In May 1977, Raj moved with his partner (another trans man) and the partner's two children to Calgary, Alberta, because they had learned that surgeons at the Foothills Hospital, in affiliation with the University of Calgary's gender clinic, were performing phalloplasties for female-to-male (FTM) transsexuals. While they were both approved for phalloplasty, neither of them had the surgery at that time; at only 100 pounds, the surgeons concluded that Raj did not have enough tissue to work with. Raj did, however, undergo a panhysterectomy at this time. After another 34 years, he underwent metoidioplasty in Montreal, Quebec in 2012 at age 60.

Raj officially retired in 2017, and now lives in southern Europe.

== Education and professional affiliations ==
In 2001, Raj graduated from the Adler School of Professional Psychology with a Master of Arts in counseling psychology. Raj has been a member of the Canadian Professional Association for Transgender Health (CPATH) since 2007, and in 2015 became a Canadian Certified Counsellor (CCC) and joined the College of Registered Psychotherapists of Ontario (CRPO).

== Career ==
In a speech given at the 2016 Moving Trans History Forward Founders Panel, Raj described the work that he had done over the past thirty years, including "providing information, referrals, education, counseling, [...] free education, doing training workshops, offering newsletter and magazine subscriptions on transsexualism, gender dysphoria, and gender reassignment to psychiatrists, psychologists, psychotherapists, social workers, physicians, and nurses, as well as researchers academics, educators, students, lawyers, policy makers, and politicians."

=== Foundation for the Advancement of Canadian Transsexuals and Gender Review ===
In January 1978, Raj started an organization for trans people, the Foundation for the Advancement of Canadian Transsexuals (FACT); the organization's newsletter was Gender Review: A FACTual Journal. FACT continued some of the earlier work of the ACT. The first issue of Gender Review was published in June 1978 and included a story on "Transsexual Oppression" concerning Montrealer Inge Stephens; information about transsexual resources; a listing of publications by Harry Benjamin and Charles L. Ihlenfeld; a bibliography of books and articles by and about trans people; and news items about Mario Martino, trans woman Canary Conn's appearance on The Phil Donahue Show, and other notices. Raj moved back to Ottawa and then to Toronto in the following years, but continued to edit the journal until February 1982.

In December 1981, Raj decided to focus on the specific needs of trans men, for which there were very few advocacy groups. Raj's work, based in Toronto, joined that of Mario and Becky Martino's Labyrinth Foundation's Counseling Services in Yonkers, New York; Johnny A's F2M meetings in New York City and Rites of Passage newsletter out of Tenafly, New Jersey; Jude Patton's Renaissance group in Santa Ana, California; and Jeff S.'s group in Southern California. Raj resigned from his role at both FACT and Gender Review, and both were taken over by Susan Huxford, a trans woman from Hamilton, Ontario with whom Raj had begun working in late 1979.

=== Metamorphosis Medical Research Foundation and Metamorphosis Magazine ===
Raj had planned to partner with Mario Martino (also known as Angelo Tornabene) in Yonkers to research, develop, and market a penile prosthetic device as an alternative to phalloplasty. This inspired Raj's naming of a new organization, the Metamorphosis Medical Research Foundation (MMRF). Raj also wanted to provide support for other trans men and serve as an information broker between the medical/psychological community and trans men and their loved ones. Beginning in 1979 and through the MMRF years, Raj was also an active correspondent with Lou Sullivan, and Raj's friendship and activism played an important role in Sullivan's later work in founding the San Francisco-based support and education group "FTM" in 1986.

Raj founded the bi-monthly magazine Metamorphosis (February 1982 – February 1988).^{[note 1]} The magazine gave information on various aspects of trans men's lives, clinical research, hormones, surgery, tips for passing as male in public, and legal reform for transgender people. Metamorphosis became the most prominent international magazine for FTMs in the 1980s. Most of its subscribers were American, but there were also trans men subscribers from Canada, Great Britain, Europe, Australia, and New Zealand.

In 1988, Raj decided to close MMRF and end publication of Metamorphosis due to cumulative burnout.

=== Gender Worker and Gender NetWorker ===
Raj formed a new organization in June 1988, Gender Worker (later named "Gender Consultants" when his then-wife joined as a co-consultant), and published a new newsletter called Gender NetWorker specifically designed for "helping professionals and resource providers" who worked with trans people; it ran two issues. Between 1990 and 1999, Raj was not publicly active as a trans activist, in hopes of healing from burnout. Raj re-emerged in 1999 to begin a support group in Toronto called the Trans-Men/FTM Peer-Support Group. Since then, Raj has been active in Toronto as a psychotherapist, gender specialist, and trans-positive professional trainer.

=== RR Consulting and Beyond ===
In April 2002, Raj founded RR Consulting, a part-time, home-based, private psychotherapy and consulting practice serving trans, genderqueer, intersex, and two-spirit adults and their loved ones as well as kids and their parents. He also assessed trans people for readiness for either gender-affirming hormone therapy or gender-affirming surgery. Additionally, he provided trans-focused training workshops on gender identity and transition for hospitals, health centres, universities, colleges and corporate workplaces. In November 2002, Raj started working as a mental health counselor at Sherbourne Health Centre (SHC) in Toronto, providing individual, couples, and family therapy for LGBTQ people and their loved ones, and also co-facilitated SHC's "Gender Journeys" (a psychoeducational group for people considering transitioning) from 2006 to 2013. He retired from SHC in 2015.

Beyond his clinical work, Raj was active in the trans, genderqueer, intersex, and two-spirit community in Toronto, participating in numerous community advisory boards for local community agencies, spearheading the first annual Trans Pride Day at SHC in 2004. He delivered public speeches at the 2011 Honoured Dyke Group event of Pride Toronto (honouring the Trans Lobby Group, of which Raj was the sole trans male member); the 2012 Toronto Trans March; and the 2014 Transgender Day of Remembrance held at Toronto City Hall, proclaiming it as an official day in Toronto along with the raising of the first Ontario trans flag. On July 1, 2018, he marched in the Trans* Pride Toronto March, carrying the Trans Coalition Project (Toronto) banner with Toronto Trans Alliance leader, Stephanie Woolley and Trans Lobby Group leader, Susan Gapka. On August 4, he led Simcoe Pride's Trans* Rally/March in Orillia, Ontario, along with trans youth leader Brandon Rhéal Amyot.

=== "Voluntary gender work" and burnout ===
Rupert Raj coined the term "voluntary gender worker" to describe the unofficial (and often unrecognized) labor that transgender activists do. Raj worked to bring attention to the risks that voluntary gender work brings to those who do it in a 1987 essay titled "Burnout: Unsung Heroes And Heroines In The Transgender World", originally published in The Transsexual Voice. Almost thirty years later, Raj announced that he had taken indefinite medical leave as a result of burnout, and he officially retired from his job as a psychotherapist at Toronto's Sherbourne Health Centre.

== Publications and presentations ==
Raj has published four trans-focused clinical research papers. He wrote an essay in the 1997 edited collection Gender Blending. Raj is also the co-editor (with Dan Irving of Carleton University) of Trans Activism in Canada: A Reader.

Since 1999, Raj has designed and delivered more than 20 trans-focused training workshops and presentations in Canada, the US, and the UK. In April 2006, he taught a course at the Adler School of Professional Psychology in Toronto, employing his 2002 "TransPositive Therapeutic Model" supporting trans adults. Building on this model, Raj's 2008 "TransFormative Therapeutic Model" supported therapists working with couples and families with trans members, as well as gender non-conforming youth and their parents.

From 1982 to 1991, Rupert compiled and edited an international trans poetry anthology, Of Souls and Roles, Of Sex and Gender, which he donated in manuscript form to The ArQuives in 2006. From 1991 to 2014, he added several more poems and modified the title to Of Souls & Roles, Of Sex & Gender: A Treasury of Transsexual, Transgenderist & Transvestic Verse from 1967 to 1991. The volume includes nearly 400 poems penned by 169 trans people throughout Canada, the US, the UK, Ireland, Australia, and New Zealand, and was donated to the Transgender Archives at the University of Victoria where it is available via PDF.

In 2017, an article Raj wrote called "Worlds in Collision" appeared in the anthology of writing about Toronto's queer history, Any Other Way: How Toronto Got Queer. His memoir, Dancing The Dialectic: True Tales of A Transgender Trailblazer was first published in 2017; a second edition was published in 2020.

== Recognition ==
Raj has received a number of awards, including a listing in The International Who's Who In Sexology, first edition. In 2000, Xanthra McKay made a 23-minute video entitled "Rupert Remembers" in which Raj discusses trans spaces and activism in Toronto during the 1970s and 1980s. Raj has been awarded two Lifetime Achievement Awards: the City of Toronto's Pride Award (2007) and the Community One Foundation's Steinert and Ferreiro Award for leadership in Canadian LGBTTIQQ2S communities (2010).

In 2011, the Trans Health Lobby was the Honoured Dyke Group from Pride Toronto. The THLG was co-founded by Rupert Raj, Susan Gapka, Michelle Hogan, Joanne Nevermann, and Darla S.

In 2013, Raj was inducted into The ArQuives' National Portrait Collection. Original Plumbing, a Brooklyn-based trans* male quarterly periodical, included Raj in its 2013 Hero issue alongside other trans* historical figures and activists. Raj was featured in episodes 8 and 31 of the 2000/2001 Canadian TV documentary series Skin Deep, and in a 2001 video called "Rewriting the Script: Love Letter to Our Families" which reflected the experiences of queer South Asians and their families. Also in 2013, the Trans Lobby Group, which Raj co-founded as the Trans Health Lobby Group, won an Inspire Award in Toronto for Community Organization of the Year. The Canadian Centre for Gender and Sexual Diversity featured Rupert's work on their "Resources" page for transgender, intersex, and two-spirit people.

In 2022, Raj received an honorary Doctor of Law degree from Simon Fraser University. In October 2022, Rupert was presented with Fantasia Fair's Transgender Pioneer Award. In 2023, an entry on Raj was added to The Canadian Encyclopedia.

== Notes ==
^{note 1} At this point, Raj was still using his earlier chosen name, Nicholas (or Nick) Christopher Ghosh. In later years, he started using the name "Rupert Raj" as a pseudonym, to separate his trans activism (under the name Rupert Raj) from his personal life (where he used the name Nick Ghosh). In 1988, he made "Rupert Raj" his legal name, using it in his activism and personal life, stopping the use of "Nick Ghosh."
