= Transgender rights movement =

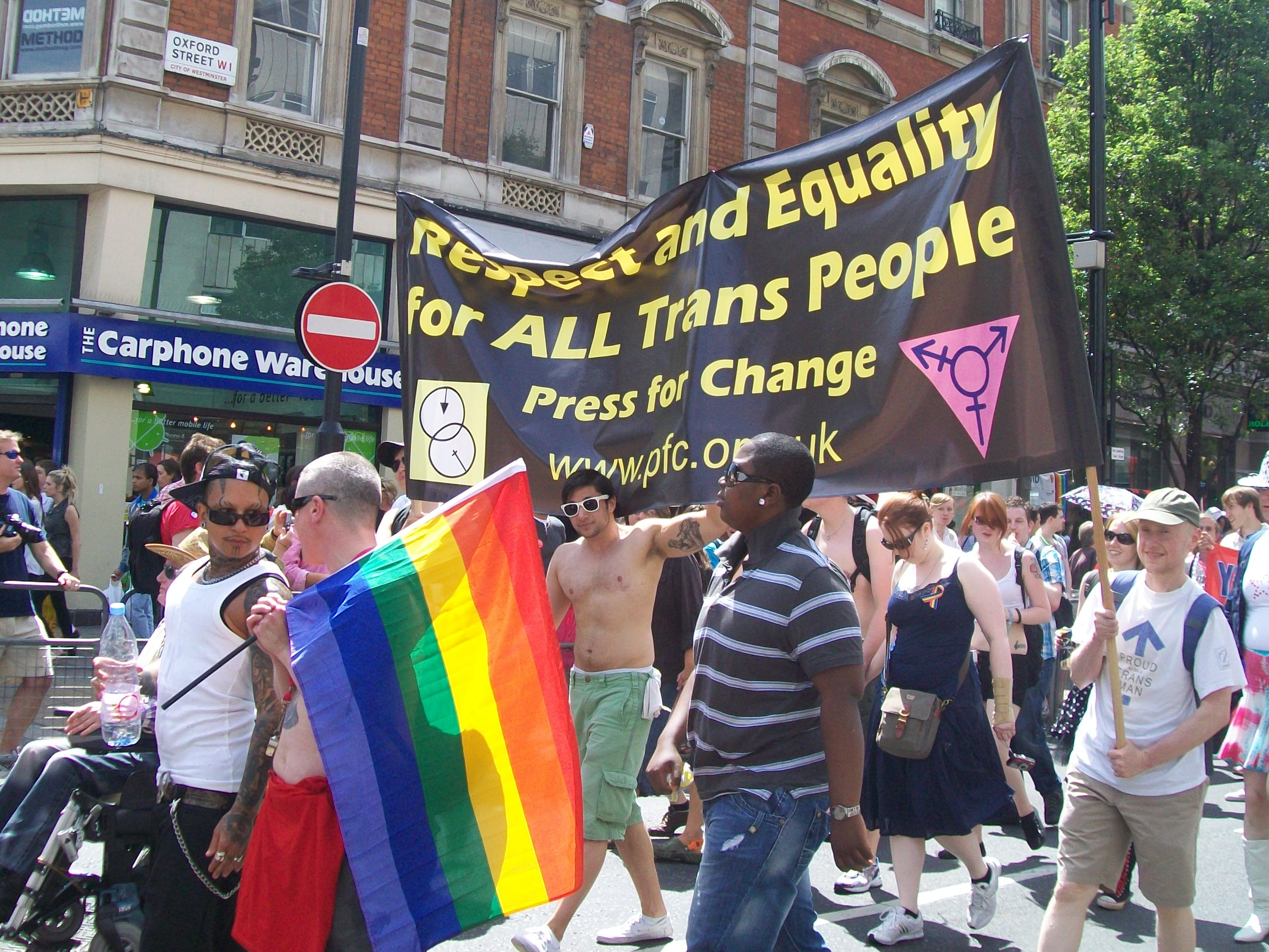
Pride in London, 3 July 2010. The banner the crowd is holding up reads: "Respect and Equality for ALL Trans People. Press for Change"

The transgender rights movement is a movement to promote the legal status of transgender people and to eliminate discrimination and violence against transgender people regarding housing, employment, public accommodations, education, and health care. It is part of the broader LGBTQ rights movements.

Where they exist, legally enshrined anti-discrimination protections, and protections against targeted hate crimes, have been described as significant successes of the transgender rights movement. Another key goal of transgender activism is to allow changes to identification documents to recognize a person's current gender identity without the need for gender-affirming surgery or any medical requirements, which is known as gender self-identification. The Office of the High Commissioner for Human Rights (OHCHR) argues that legal gender recognition should be provided by states, in part because not doing so "hinders access to rights and services (e.g. education, employment, bathrooms) and puts trans people at risk of violence (e.g. when presenting documents that don't match their appearance)." The European Court of Justice ruled that states should legally recognize a person's gender without invasive or excessive requirements, and the Supreme Court of Japan ruled that forced sterilization cannot be required.

Human rights experts argue that transgender rights can be derived from universal human rights. The group Robert F. Kennedy Human Rights successfully argued that transgender people have the right to life under the American Convention on Human Rights. The right to security of person has been applied to transgender rights under the International Covenant on Civil and Political Rights. Other universal rights applied to transgender rights have included freedom of expression via the Yogyakarta Principles, freedom from discrimination under the Universal Declaration of Human Rights, and the right to dignity.

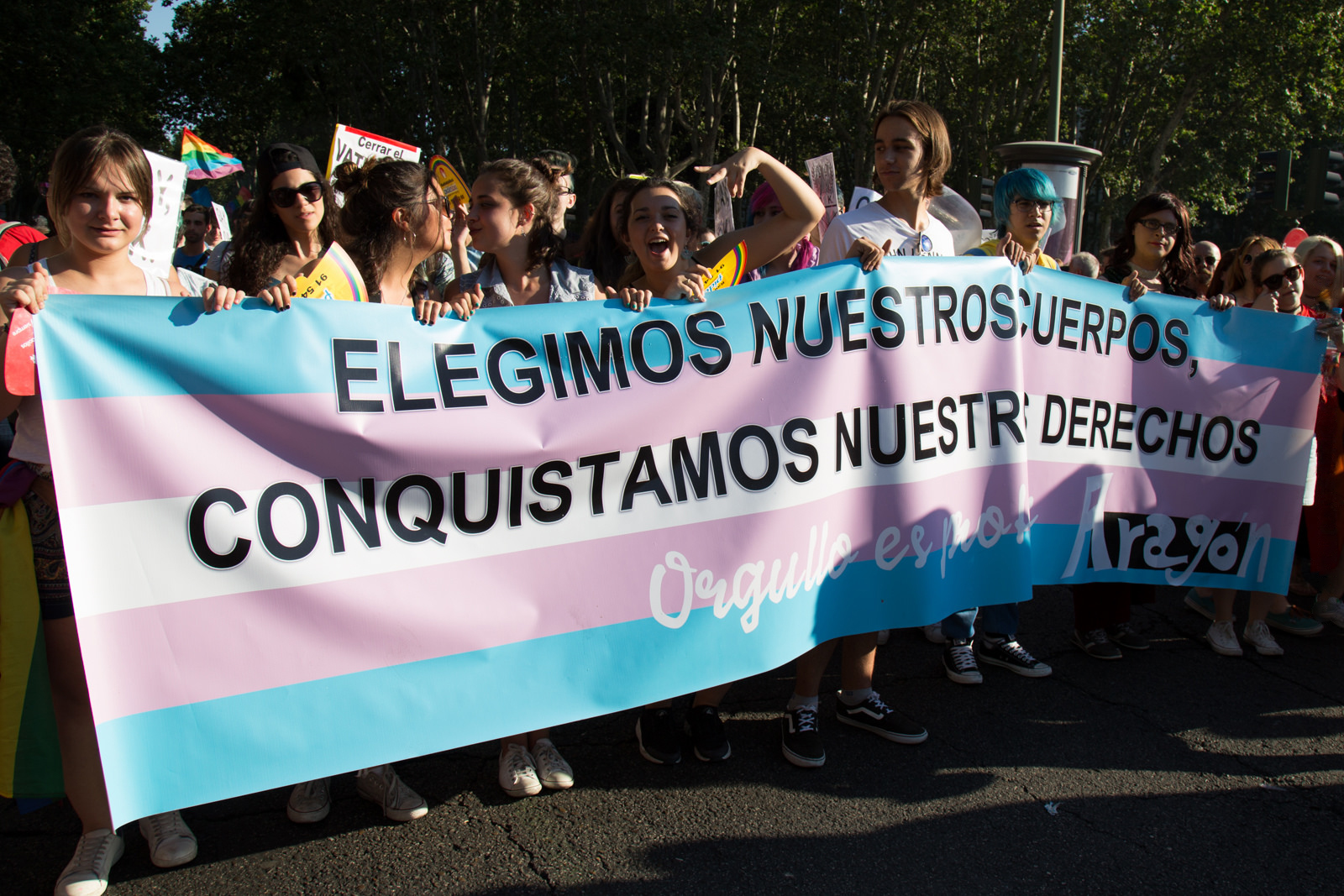
Madrid Pride 2016. The banner the crowd is holding together reads: "We choose our bodies, we conquer our rights"

== History ==
Identifying the boundaries of a trans movement has been a matter of some debate.

In part because of the work of Magnus Hirschfeld, in the 1910s and 1920s, Germans obtained the right to "cross-dress" if they had a pass, and also to change their legal name to one that aligned with their gender identity. These passes were mainly given to middle-class, male-to-female individuals attracted to women who wanted to avoid associations with gay and lesbian culture in Weimar Germany.

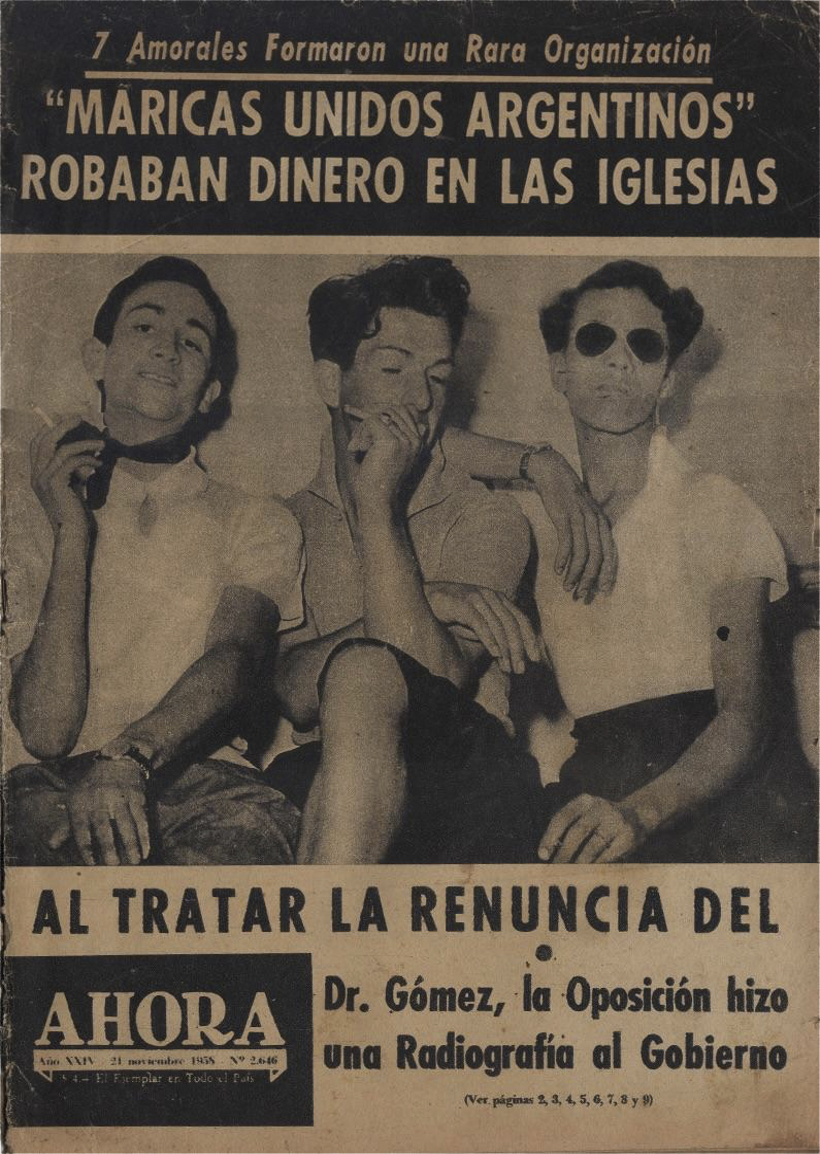
Members of Maricas Unidas Argentinas (MUA) on the cover of sensationalist magazine Ahora, 1958. The organization is one of the first documented cases of trans activism.

Towards the end of the 1940s and into the 1950s, a small clandestine mutual aid network called Maricas Unidas Argentinas (MUA; roughly "Argentine United Queers") emerged in Buenos Aires, Argentina, which has been described as the first documented case of trans activism. Before categories such as travesti, transgender and gay became widespread, Argentine maricas or locas occupied a social position between what are now understood as gender identity and sexual orientation, including both effeminate gay men and people who would today be considered trans women or travestis. Under the Peronist government, repression of those labeled "amoral" intensified, and the Devoto prison became the main detention site for homosexual and gender-nonconforming people in Buenos Aires. In this context, MUA emerged as a mutual supporting those imprisoned and those released without work or family support. Knowledge of MUA is recent and has revised the historiography of Argentina's LGBT movement: while former member Malva Solís dated its formation to around 1948, the only known press report places it in 1957, still at least a decade earlier than Nuestro Mundo, often considered Latin America's first LGBT organization.

Conventionally, evidence of a codified political identity emerges in 1952, when Virginia Prince, a trans woman, along with others, launched Transvestia: The Journal of the American Society for Equality in Dress. This publication is considered by some to be the beginning of the transgender rights movement in the United States, however, it would be many years before the term "transgender" itself would come into common usage.

In the years before the June 1969 Stonewall riots in Greenwich Village, Manhattan, other actions for LGBT rights had taken place.

An early but not widely known action is the Cooper Do-nuts Riot of 1959 that took place in Downtown Los Angeles, California, when drag queens, lesbians, gay men, and transgender people who hung out at Cooper Do-nuts and who were frequently harassed by the LAPD fought back after police arrested three people, including John Rechy. Patrons began pelting the police with donuts and coffee cups. The LAPD called for backup and arrested several rioters. Rechy and the other two original detainees were able to escape.

In August 1966, the Compton's Cafeteria riot occurred in the Tenderloin district of San Francisco, California. This incident was one of the first recorded LGBT-related riots in United States history. In an incident similar to Cooper's, drag queens, prostitutes, and trans people fought back against police harassment. When a transgender woman resisted arrest by throwing coffee at a police officer, drag queens poured into the streets, fighting back with their high heels and heavy bags. The next night, the regular patrons were joined by street hustlers, Tenderloin street people, and other members of the LGBT community in their stand against police violence. It marked the beginning of trans activism in San Francisco.

In 1969, the year of the Stonewall riots, the term transgender was not yet in use. But gender nonconforming people like drag king Stormé DeLarverie, and self-identified "street queen" Marsha P. Johnson were in the vanguard of the riots, with DeLarverie widely believed to be the person whose struggle with the police was the spark that set the crowd to fight back. Witnesses to the uprising also place early trans activists and members of the Gay Liberation Front, Zazu Nova and Jackie Hormona along with Johnson, as combatants "in the vanguard" of the pushback against the police on the multiple nights of the rebellion.

Marsha P. Johnson later went on to co-found Street Transvestite Action Revolutionaries (STAR) in New York City with a close friend, Sylvia Rivera. Rivera's early definitions around trans were very broad, including all gender-nonconforming people. Rivera continued to be an advocate for trans rights and inclusion of protection for trans people in all LGBT rights legislation until she died in 2002.

In the 1980s, female-to-male (FTM) transsexuality became more broadly known.

In 1992, Leslie Feinberg printed and circulated a pamphlet titled "Transgender Liberation: A Movement Whose Time Has Come". Feinberg's pamphlet begins by calling on the trans community to compose their definitions, invoking language as a tool that unites people divided by oppression. From here, Feinberg traces the emergence of oppression imposed by the ruling class using institutions. These institutions, run by the elite, enforce a gender binary at the expense of communal societies that encouraged liberal gender expression. Women were devalued, and effeminacy was disparaged to promote patriarchal economic privilege. According to Feinberg, the gender binary is a contrivance of Western civilization. Having acknowledged this, Feinberg encourages all humans to reclaim the natural continuum of gender expression that identifies trans individuals as sacred. Feinberg concludes by empowering the working class to liberate themselves from the ruling class, which can be achieved by directing the labor of marginalized groups towards the common goal of revolution.

During the early 1990s, travesti activism took off in Argentina, which established itself within the broader national LGBT movement as among the groups with the longest trajectory and impact.

In 1993, Adela Vázquez, a Latina transgender woman, protested in San Francisco over the government removing the transgender community from the workforce because they labeled them disabled. However, that situation is making some progress and is changing. By 2014, per The National Gay and Lesbian Task Force record, only 17 states (and the District of Columbia) in the United States of America had laws that protected individuals in the transgender community (about 45% of U.S. states); states that presented these protections then were: California, Colorado, Connecticut, Delaware, District of Columbia, Hawaii, Illinois, Iowa, Maine, Massachusetts, Minnesota, New Jersey, New Mexico, Nevada, Oregon, Rhode Island, Vermont, Washington, and Wisconsin. Furthermore, there are organizations that are working to increase the numbers of states having these laws, including the TGI Justice Project, the Transgender Law Center, and Advocates for Trans Equality.

On December 31, 1993, a trans man named Brandon Teena was murdered in Nebraska along with two of his friends. This murder was documented in the 1999 movie Boys Don't Cry starring Hilary Swank as Brandon Teena.

With the publication of 1996's Transgender Warriors, Leslie Feinberg brought the word "transgender" more fully into use. Like Rivera, Feinberg also defined "transgender" very broadly, including drag queens and gender-nonconforming people from history. A dedicated communist, Feinberg included an analysis of many who are oppressed by the apparatus of capitalism.

Transgender Day of Remembrance, an annual day of remembrance to commemorate those murdered in transphobic hate crimes founded by transgender advocate, Gwendolyn Ann Smith, was first held in 1999 following the murder of Rita Hester in 1998. The "Remembering our Dead" web project was also set up in 1999.

In June 2012, CeCe McDonald was wrongfully imprisoned for having defended herself against Neo-Nazi attackers with a pair of scissors, which resulted in the death of one of her assailants. Her story was publicized by a GLAAD Media Award winning article in Ebony.com. Laverne Cox, openly trans actress on Orange Is the New Black, launched a campaign to raise the consciousness of cruel prison conditions for incarcerated trans individuals and rallied to free CeCe. After serving 19 months, she was released in January 2014.

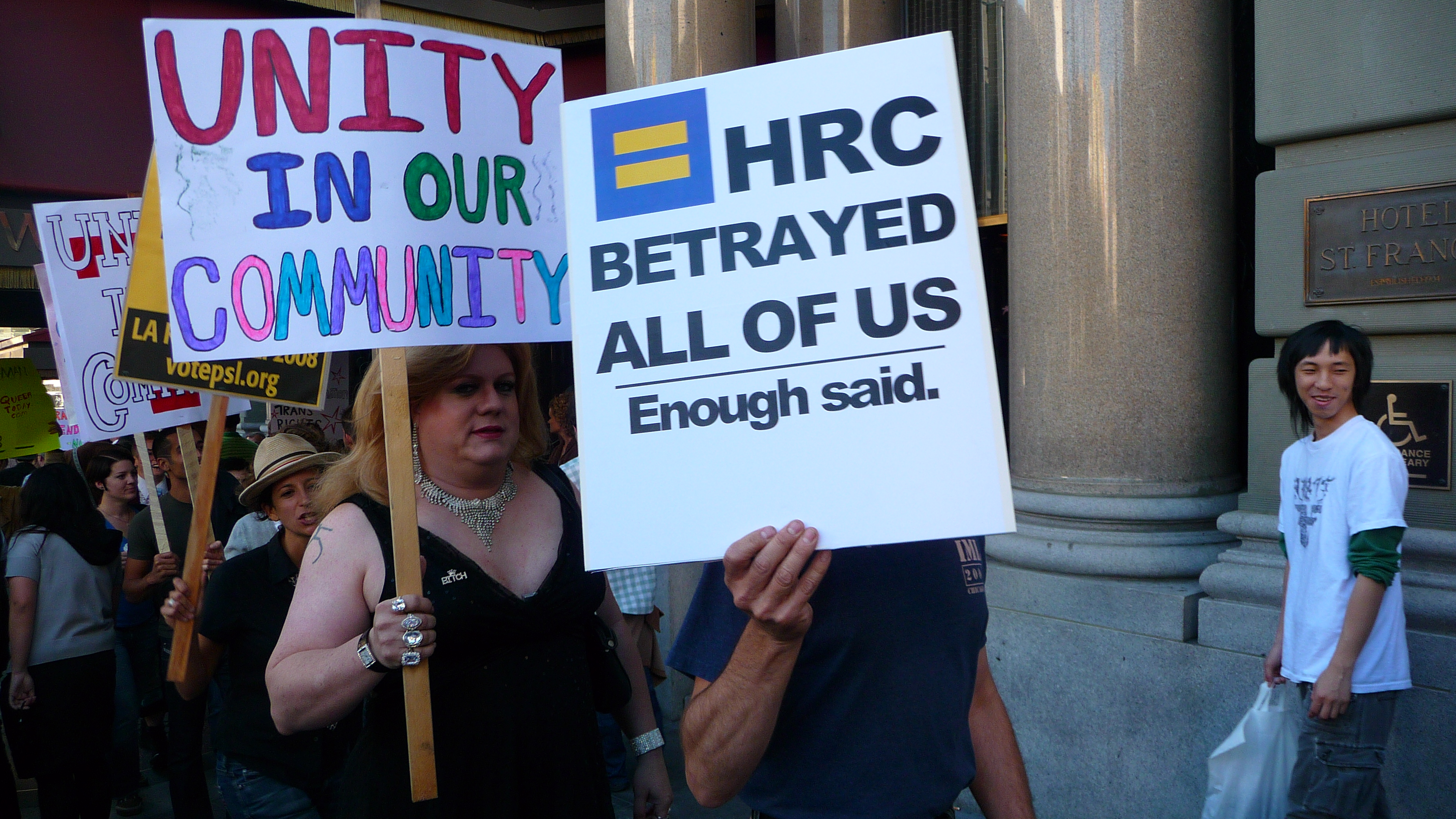
Left OUT Party. Two signs reflecting some of the individuals protesting.

On March 26–27, 2013, LGBT activists gathered at the Supreme Court in Washington, D.C., to support marriage equality, but amid these demonstrations, one speaker was asked to edit their proceedings to conceal their trans identity, and the trans community was asked to lower their pride flags. This incident follows years of tension between activist groups, namely Human Rights Campaign and the trans community, because the trans community is often neglected or blatantly excluded from events and political consideration. The incident resulted in a backlash and public criticism by the trans community. In response, activist groups apologized for the incident, and in 2014, HRC promised to energize efforts for promoting trans rights.

In Florida in March 2015, Representative Frank Artiles (R-Miami) proposed House Bill 583, which would ensure that individuals who enter public facilities such as bathrooms or locker rooms designated for those who are of the "other biological sex" could be jailed for up to 60 days. Artiles claims that it was proposed for the sake of public safety.

In 2017, Kate Lynn Blatt, Civil Rights Activist, Became the first transgender person to sue under the (ADA) Americans With Disabilities Act. In the landmark case of (Blatt vs Cabela's Retail Inc). Expanding rights to all transgender people in a case that has now become the backbone of most, if not all, federal rulings following its passage in May 2017.

In September 2017, the Botswana High Court ruled that the refusal of the Registrar of National Registration to change a transgender man's gender marker was "unreasonable and violated his constitutional rights to dignity, privacy, freedom of expression, equal protection of the law, freedom from discrimination, and freedom from inhumane and degrading treatment". LGBT activists celebrated the ruling, describing it as a great victory. At first, the Botswana Government announced it would appeal the ruling, but decided against it in December, supplying the trans man with a new identity document that reflects his gender identity.

A similar case, where a transgender woman sought to change her gender marker to female, was heard in December 2017. The High Court ruled that the Government must recognize her gender identity. She dedicated her victory to "every single trans diverse person in Botswana".

The Brooklyn Liberation March, the largest transgender rights demonstration in history, took place on June 14, 2020, in Brooklyn, focused on supporting Black transgender rights and drew an estimated 15,000 to 20,000 participants.

In 2023, trans rights protesters occupied the Oklahoma state capitol building after passage of Senate Bill 129.

== Universal human rights context ==
Transgender rights have been outlined by human rights experts "on the basis of the Universal Declaration of Human Rights and subsequently agreed international human rights treaties." Some of the universal human rights referenced by human rights experts as relevant to transgender rights include:

- Right to life. In example, a 2021 ruling that was originally litigated by Robert F. Kennedy Human Rights concerned a case of gender-related violence in a trans-femicide in Honduras. For the conclusion of that case, the Inter-American Court of Human Rights affirmed that signatories to the American Convention on Human Rights must protect a trans person's right to life, that a proper investigation must be conducted in cases of gender-targeted violence, and that protection against discrimination is a part of upholding the right to life.
- Right to liberty and security of the person. This right, appearing in international frameworks like the International Covenant on Civil and Political Rights (ICCPR), has been cited by a range of rights groups with relevance to transgender rights. The international Yogyakarta Principles reference the right to security of the person as a justification for undertaking awareness campaigns to reduce prejudice, in order to prevent violence. The UN Human Rights Committee says that rights including the right to security of the person and the right to life are violated by governments that prevent a transgender person's access to health care.
- Freedom of speech or expression, and freedom of thought. The Yogyakarta Principles state that this right "includes the expression of identity or personhood through … choice of name, or any other means, as well as the freedom to seek, receive and impart information and ideas of all kinds, including with regard to human rights, sexual orientation and gender identity." The UN Human Rights Committee cites the ICCPR as relevant to the matter: "Everyone shall have the right to freedom of expression; this right shall include freedom to seek, receive and impart information and ideas of all kinds, regardless of frontiers, either orally, in writing or in print, in the form of art, or through any other media of his choice".
- Right to equality before the law, and freedom from discrimination. The Office of the High Commissioner for Human Rights (OHCHR) states that discrimination against transgender people "undermines the human rights principles outlined in the Universal Declaration of Human Rights." The Supreme Court of the United States determined in its 2020 Bostock v. Clayton County decision that discrimination against transgender people on the basis of being transgender is a form of sex-based discrimination; the court stated that "it is impossible to discriminate against a person for being homosexual or transgender without discriminating against that individual based on sex". The UN Human Rights Committee states that some areas of concern for discrimination include "employment, education, and housing".
- Right to gender recognition. The OHCHR states that transgender people have a right to "legal recognition of their gender identity and a change of gender in official documents, including birth certificates, without being subjected to onerous and abusive requirements." The OHCHR further argues that when gender recognition is not upheld as a right, this "hinders access to rights and services (e.g. education, employment, bathrooms) and puts trans people at risk of violence (e.g. when presenting documents that don't match their appearance)."
- Right to dignity, and right to privacy. The universal right to dignity has been applied to transgender rights, including under legal frameworks such as the Charter of Fundamental Rights of the European Union, the African Charter on Human and Peoples' Rights, and the Eighth Amendment to the United States Constitution. The UN Human Rights Committee stated that "targeted animosity, which has often been endorsed and encouraged by government officials" creates a general "climate of animosity … [that] threatens the right to life with dignity under the ICCPR". The committee stated that "dehumanizing and discriminatory rhetoric" by politicians falls under this description because it creates discriminatory environments. In another example, the High Court of Kenya ruled that a trans person's right to dignity and privacy were violated by mandated stripping, searches, and medical examinations.

== Issues of concern ==
=== Legislation regarding usage of public restrooms ===
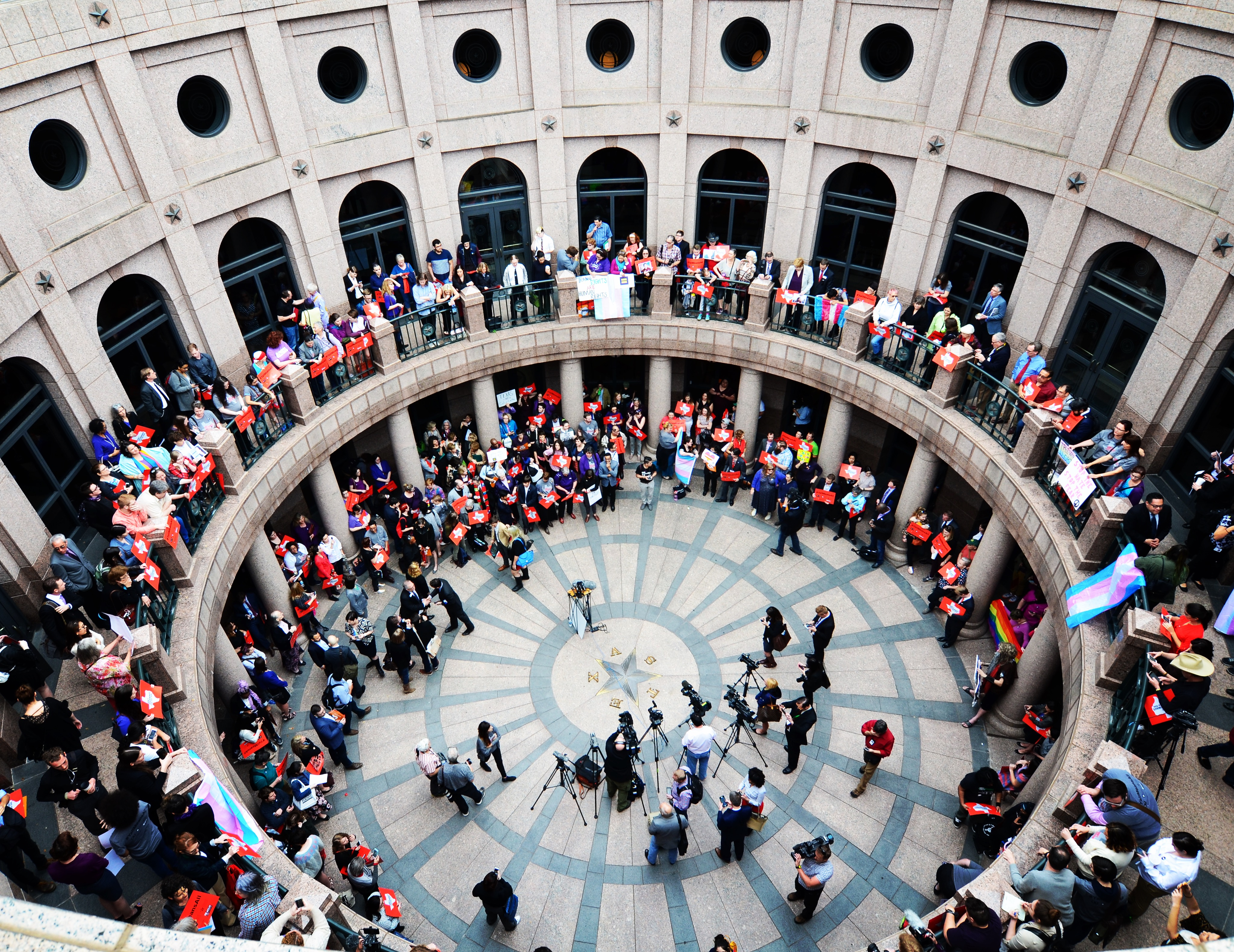
Texan protest outside senate committee against bathroom bill (March 2017)

In the United States, the "bathroom bill" issue first came to public attention in 2013 when the Colorado Civil Rights Division ruled in favor of transgender six-year-old student Coy Mathis' right to use the girls' toilet at her elementary school in Fountain, Colorado. The case, along with Mathis and her family, was again brought to public attention with the 2016 release of the documentary Growing Up Coy.

In the wake of the Mathis case, numerous states have put forth or passed legislation that obligates transgender people to use the public bathroom corresponding to their sex as assigned at birth. As of July 2017, sixteen states had considered such bills and one state, North Carolina, passed its bill into law. The North Carolina House Bill 2, or HB2, was passed into law in February 2017. HB2 quickly garnered attention as the first law of its kind and sparked high-profile condemnation, including cancellations of concerts and sporting events by Bruce Springsteen and the NCAA. Amid the controversy and the inauguration of a new governor of North Carolina, the bill was repealed by the state legislature on March 30, 2017.

=== Education ===
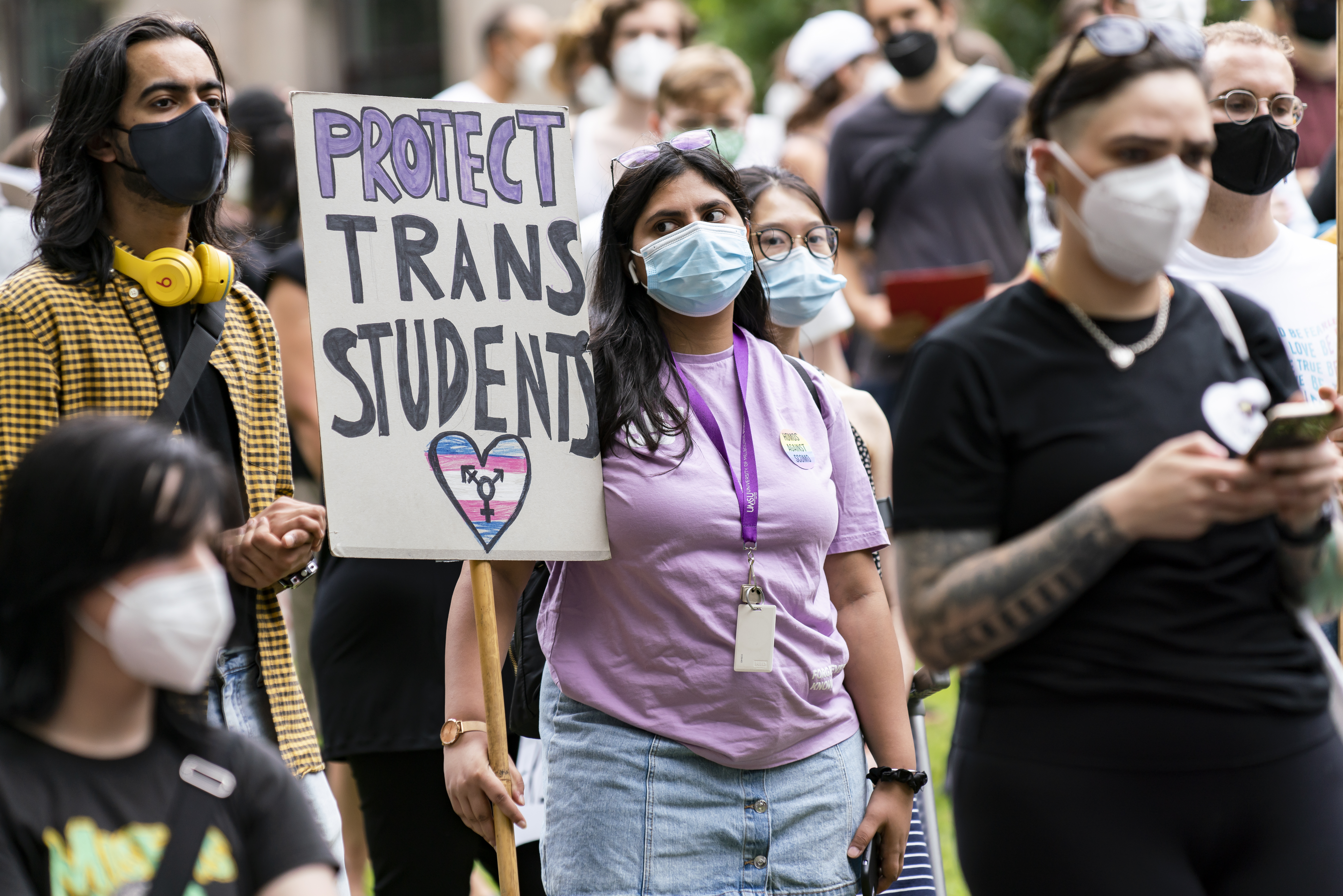
Kill bigot bill protest in Australia (February 2022)

The treatment of transgender people in educational environments has often been a focal point of the movement's concern. In a survey of Canadian high schools conducted between 2007 and 2009, 74% of students who identified themselves as transgender reported having experienced verbal harassment over their gender expression, 37% reported physical harassment over their gender expression, and 49% of trans students reported at least one instance of sexual harassment within the last school year.

In 2013, Smith College, an all-women liberal arts US college, gained notoriety for denying admission to Calliope Wong, a transgender woman. Following the incident, the college's administration and student activists engaged in a protracted battle around transgender women's rights. The first women's college in the United States to open admission to transgender women was Mills College in the year of 2014 followed closely behind by Mount Holyoke in the same year. After Mills and Mount Holyoke, Simmons University, Scripps College, Bryn Mawr, and Wellesley changed their policy to accept transgender students. Smith College and Barnard College were the last US women's colleges to change their policies to admit transgender students, effective in May and June 2015, respectively. Student activists at US women's colleges are credited for the introduction of more inclusionary policies allowing admission of trans women in spaces which historically have excluded them. Mount Holyoke remains gender-inclusive, admitting not only transgender women but also transgender men and non-binary people under its all-persons-but-cisgender-men policy.

=== Statistics of oppression ===
In a survey conducted by National Center for Transgender Equality and the National Gay and Lesbian Task Force, called "Injustice at Every Turn: A Report of the National Transgender Discrimination Survey", respondents reported that 90% of them had experienced discrimination and harassment in the workplace and at school. The trans community experiences rates of unemployment that are double the national average. Additionally, one out of every twelve trans women, and one out of every eight trans women of color, are physically attacked or assaulted in public.

=== Health care ===
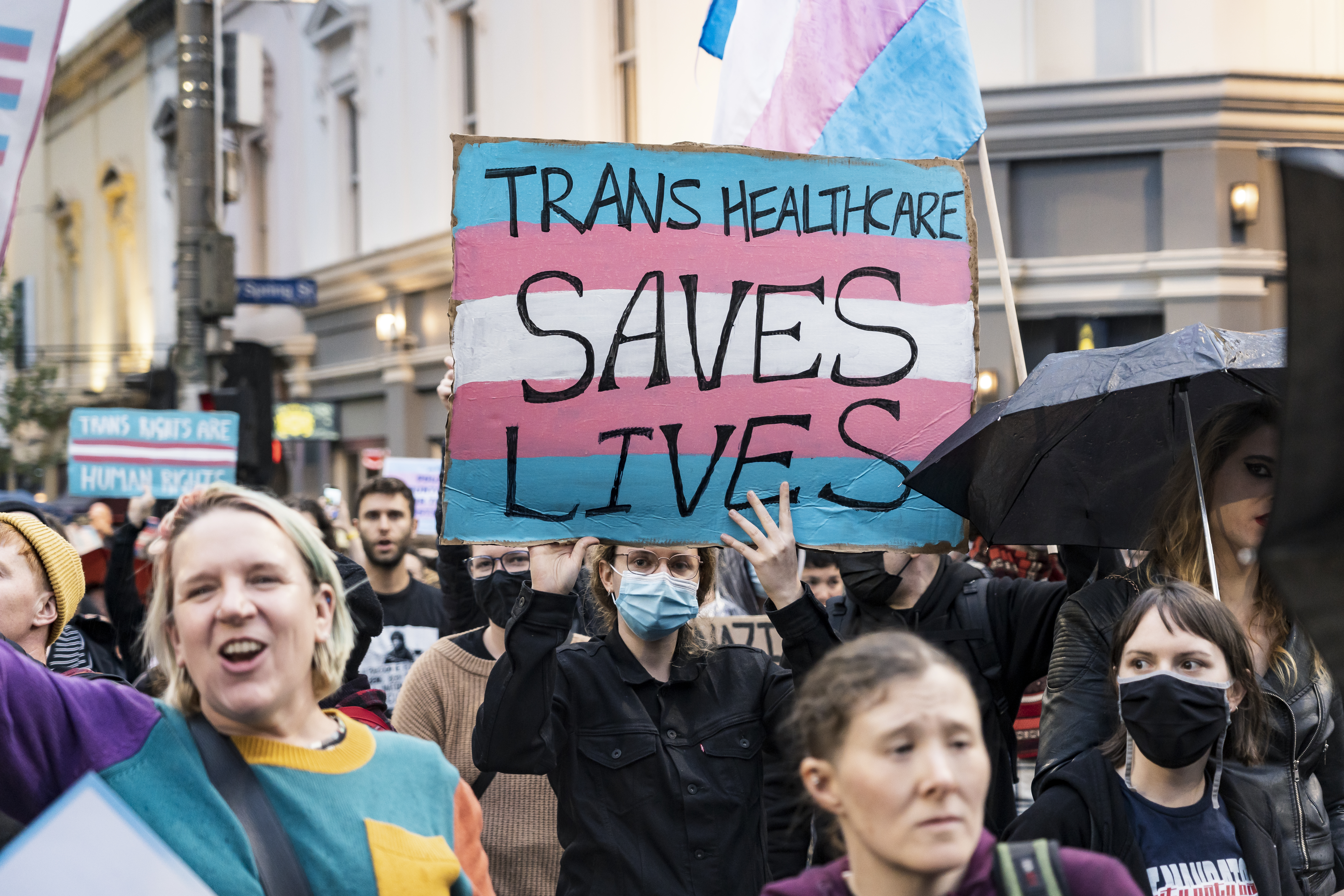
Transgender Day of Visibility 2023, Melbourne, Australia

In 2021, Alabama introduced House Bill 1, the Vulnerable Child Compassion and Protection Act made it a felony for doctors to prescribe hormone blockers, delay or prevent puberty, and hormone replacement therapy (HRT) for minors. Arkansas introduced and passed HB1570 the Save Adolescents from Experimentation (SAFE) act. The SAFE Act prohibits doctors from treating anyone under the age of 18 with gender-affirming care. North Carolina SB 514 and Oklahoma SB 676 implement similar medical bans as the previous bills but extend the age restriction to anyone under 21. In 2021, 33 states introduced bills targeted at transgender individuals, with the majority of them being similar to previously listed bills. These bills are aimed at limiting access to healthcare for transgender individuals and youth.

=== People of color ===
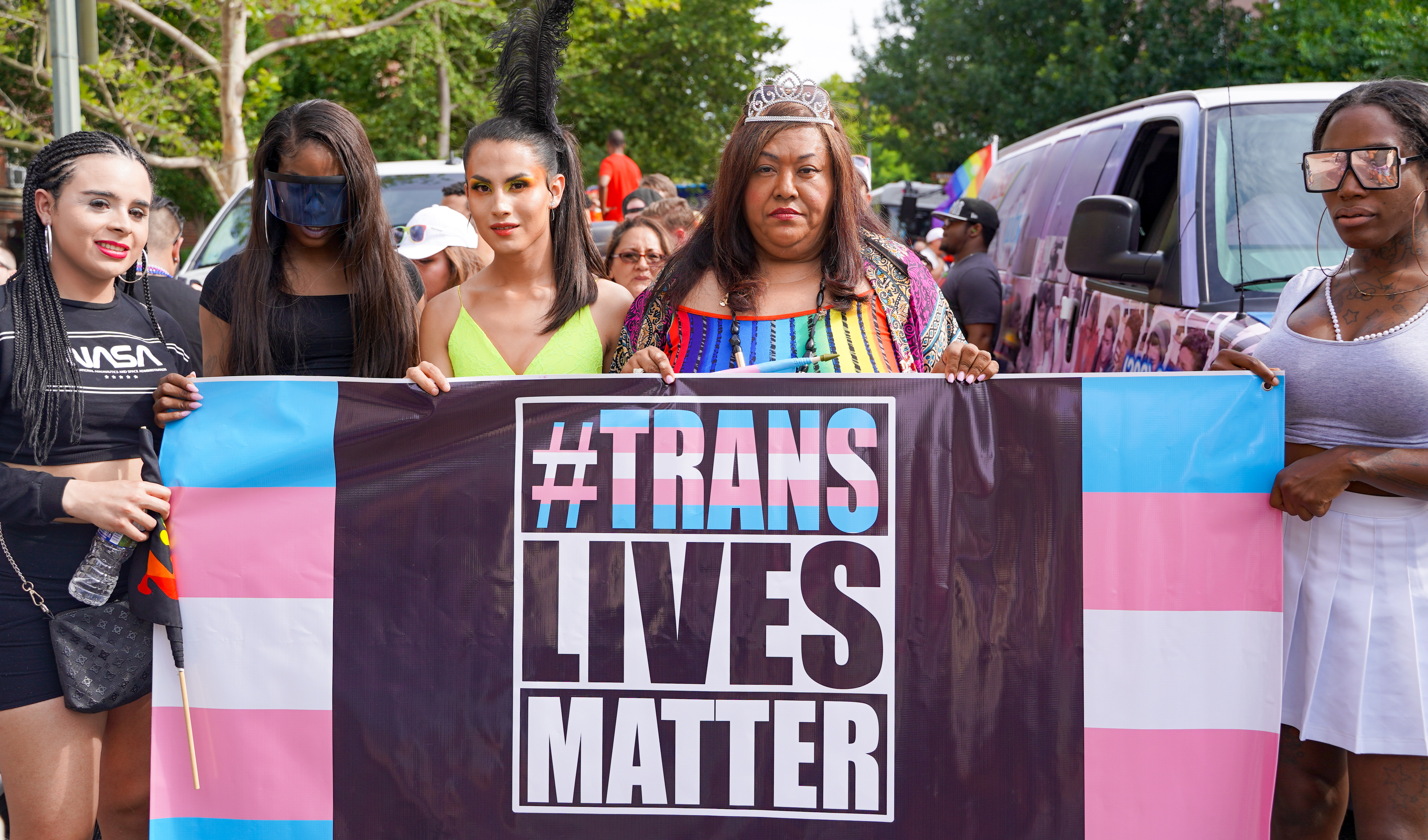
Capital Pride Parade, Washington, D.C., 2019.

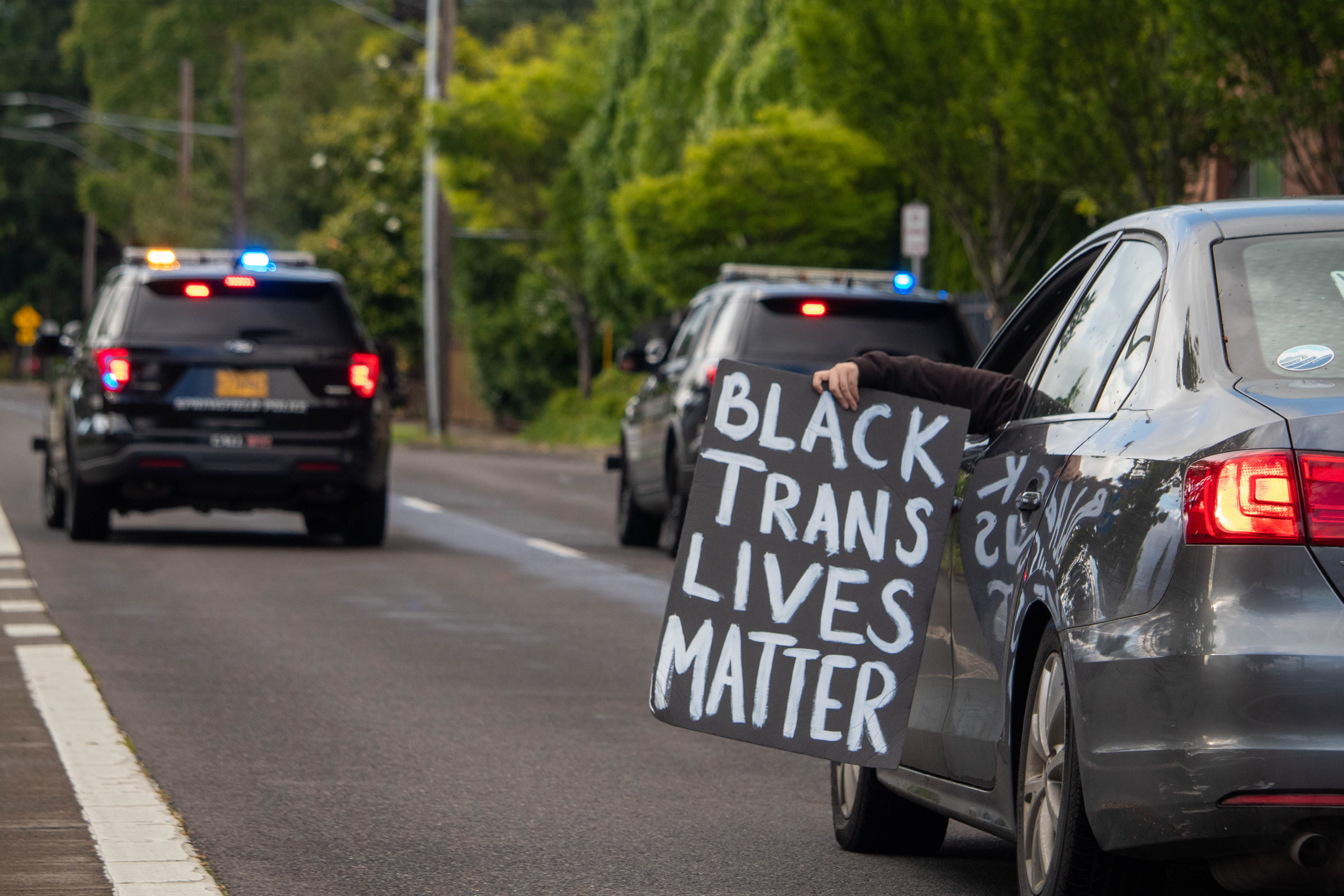
Black trans lives matter poster in Springfield, Oregon (July 2020).

Transgender people of color often face an identity that is under speculation, suspicion, doubt, and policing. Those within the trans community are often left out of the wealthy, able-bodied, American, and white experience that those in the non-trans community often focus on, and are subject to discrimination as a transgender person and as a person of color. The focus of the realms of trans visibility in pop culture and trans organizations has mostly been on white people.

Historically, this is in part due to the rejection of an individual by family members at a young age. "The majority of transgender women of color", say Juline A. Koken, David S. Bimbi, and Jeffrey T. Parsons, "experience verbal and physical abuse at the hands of their family members upon disclosing their transgender identity."

As transgender women of color face both gender and racial discrimination, their experiences may be qualitatively different from white transgender women. African-American and Latino families are deeply rooted in religious tradition, which may lead to more socially conservative and rigid ideas about gender roles, homosexuality, and traditionalism. In addition, parents also worry that their children will face additional hardships as members of double minorities.

Some of the ways white transgender people have more privilege than those of their non-white counterparts include racialized violence, better pay, better representation and benefits from the mainstream media movement. According to a National Transgender Discrimination survey, the combination of anti-transgender bias and individual racism results in transgender people of color being 6 times more likely to experience physical violence when interacting with the police compared to cisgender White people, two-thirds of LGBT homicide victims being transgender women of color, and a startling 78% attempt suicide. Of the 17 homicides of trans and gender-nonconforming people in 2017 that the project has counted so far, 16 had been people of color; 15 had been transgender women; and 13 had been black transgender women. The NCAVP survey also found that trans survivors were 1.7 times more likely to be the victims of sexual violence than cisgender survivors. Transgender/non-conforming individuals also reported over four times the national average of HIV infection (2.64% compared to 0.6%, respectively), with rates for transgender women (3.76%) and those who are unemployed (4.67%) being even higher. Black transgender people were affected by HIV even more so than these averages; 20.23% of transgender individuals with HIV are black. According to the National Transgender Discrimination Survey, 41% of respondents reported attempting suicide compared to 1.6% of the general population, with unemployment, low income, and assault (both sexual and physical) raising the risk factors.

The social stigma of being transgender is a cause for poor health care, which manifests in other areas of transgender people. Social determinants of health, including violence and discrimination, may result in negative personal psychological and physiological effects. Access to proper health care is essential in both transitioning and resilience. In a study of the resilience of transgender people of color, Jay, a 41-year-old FTM POC, stated he "had no place to turn to get help in transition—and worked five jobs trying to save money for surgery that [he] never knew if [he] would be able to afford." Another key factor to the resilience to opposition of transgender POC involved having a strong sense of pride in both ethnic and gender identities. Developing this sense of pride can be a process that involves overcoming barriers such as transphobia and racism. However, once these barriers are in fact crossed, transgender POC can start to see themselves in a better light and use their inner strength and confidence to be more persistent, optimistic, and positivity-oriented.

In recent years, there have been several housing crises among transgender people, especially transgender people of color. According to a 2016 Gallup poll, 10.052 million people in the United States identify as lesbian, gay, or transgender. Millennials, or those born between 1980 and 1998, drive virtually all of the increases overall LGBT self-identification. As the millennial generation has entered the college age, trans individuals have seen difficulty in securing basic housing rights and needs. There is a definite predominance of sex-segregated bathrooms, locker rooms, and housing where transgender people regularly are denied access, and are harassed and challenged for their gender identity. Most universities operate on the premise that gender is binary and static, and this can be especially problematic with either poorer transgender individuals or transgender people of color, since 55% of college students in the United States are white and the average income for families with college students is $74,000 – 60% higher than the national average of $46,326.

=== Trans Migration ===
Trans immigration refers to the immigration of trans individuals from one country to another. Many trans individuals migrate to seek asylum from their own country due to safety issues that stem from their identities. Many countries do not have protections in place to protect Trans individuals from hate crimes and violence against them for their trans identity. Migration is a key tool for Trans individuals so that they are able to seek safety from any harm that may come their way.

==== Arcoiris 17 ====
On August 10, 2017, the first Trans Gay Caravan attempted to cross the border between the United States of America and Mexico. The Trans Gay Caravan consisted of six gay men and eleven trans women who started their journey in Nogales, Mexico. The Trans Gay Caravan called themselves Arcoiris which translates to "Rainbow" in English. The Arcoiris 17 marched on Nogales Calle Internacional, a street that borders the U.S. Mexico border, for two hours with banners that stated "1ra Caravan Trans Gay Migrante 2017."

During the march, the Arcoiris held a press conference where some of the members spoke about why they were migrating and seeking asylum in the United States. Alexandra gave a testimonio where she stated, "We come seeking the necessary security and protection as human beings who deserve liberty, who deserve happiness...We feel obligated to come here to ask for asylum in out quest for liberty... we are talking about a vulnerable group, we are unknown in society and it is because of thins that we feel obligated to ask the U.S. government to allow us to leave under paroled detention." Another member of the group, Kimberly, discussed the violence that trans individuals faced in the countries that the group is fleeing from. Kimberly stated, "We come fleeing from out countries of origin, majority of the people do not accept us as trans girls... many of us have been abused by gang members, even police officers have treated us badly, raped us, punched us...an other thing, we have also suffered through our migration here in Mexico. Many of us have been kidnapped, forced into prostitution, we come out countries fleeing from so much pain and suffering to come hereto relive in Mexico what we have experienced in out countries." These testimonio provided attention to the group as they were migrating into the U.S. and about to cross the boarder. After the march, the group was met by border officials and then detained by Immigration and Customs Enforcement. As the Arcoiris were being taken into the detention center, Isa Noyola, the deputy director of the Transgender Law Center, told the group "Te amo y yo te veo,ok. Yo los voy a ver" which translates to "I love you and I see you, Ok. I will be watching you." This is was another attempt to bring attention to the group as they were being detained by customs.

After being held overnight my Immigration and Customs Enforcement, the caravan was moved to a detention facility in New Mexico. After Alexandra provided a testimonio that stated "We come seeking the necessary security and protection as human beings who deserve happiness...we are talking about a vulnerable group, we are unknown in society and it is because of this that we feel obligated to ask the U.S. government to allow us to leave under paroled detention," the group was then moved to a different detention center that was privately ran in Albuquerque. After being held in the detention center in Albuquerque for a month, the Arcoiris 17 were released to parole.

=== Poverty ===
Black transgender people live in extreme poverty, with 34% reporting a household income of less than $10,000 a year, which is more than twice the rate for transgender people of all races (15%), four times the black population (9%), and eight times the U.S. population (4%). Transgender people of color are more likely to be poor, be homeless, or lack a college degree. Multiple factors pile up on each other that force many transgender people of color to be homeless; for instance, many individuals are involved in abusive relationships or live in crime-ridden neighborhoods because of the difficulty finding employment as a transgender person and/or experiencing job loss due to transphobia in the work place. Those with greater socioeconomic status might use their social connections to advocate for access to appropriate housing for transgender students in ways that are not possible for most lower-income families; one proposal comes from the Administration for Children and Families, which issued the largest-ever LGBT focused federal grant to develop a model program to support LGBT foster youth and prevent them from being homeless.

=== Transmisogyny ===
Trans people experience a disproportionately large number of hate crimes, with trans women experiencing the majority of these crimes. In fact, over half of all anti-LGBTQIA+ homicides were perpetrated against transgender women. Transgender women face harsher levels of discrimination than other transgender people. A study on workplace experiences after people receive sex changes found that trans women, on average, lose almost one-third of their salary (see Gender pay gap in the United States), are respected less, and receive more harassment. At the same time, trans men often experience salary raises and greater authority in the workplace.

The experiences trans men face are vastly different from those of trans women; trans men who were raised as female were treated differently as soon as they came out as male. They gained professional experience, but lost intimacy; exuded authority, but caused fear. Cultural sexism is evident towards trans men because it is easier to be "low-disclosure" than trans women. They are usually not recognized as trans, which is known as passing, and it avoids transphobia and discrimination by others. "Women's appearances get more attention," says Julia Serano, a transfeminist, "and women's actions are commented on and critiqued more than men, so [it] just makes sense that people will focus more on trans women than trans men."

=== Definition of gender ===
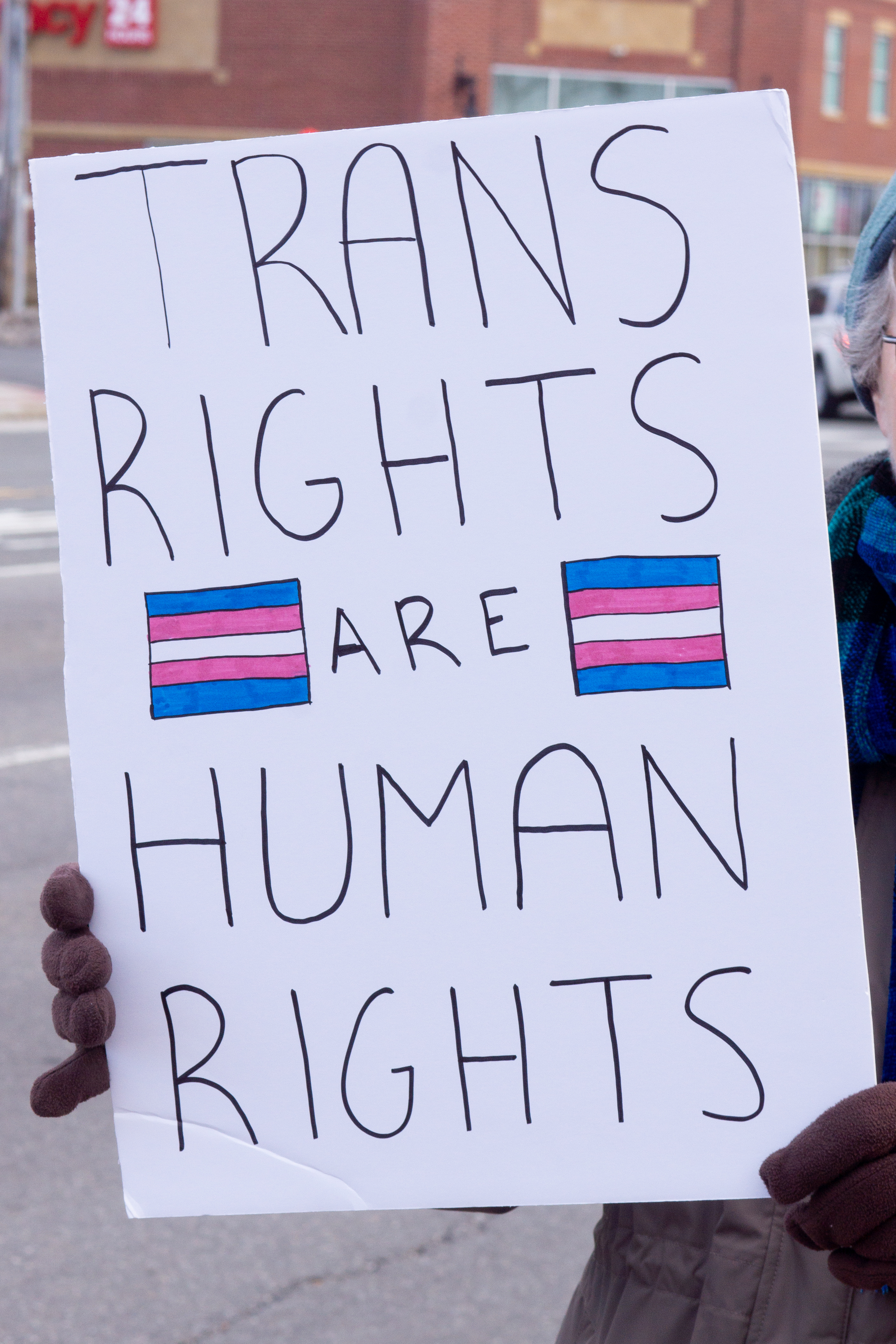
New Hampshire, U.S., January 2019

In 2018, over 2,600 scientists signed an open letter in opposition to Trump administration plans to legally define gender as a binary condition determined at birth, based on genitalia, including plans to clarify disputes using "genetic testing," stating, with emphasis, "This proposal is fundamentally inconsistent not only with science, but also with ethical practices, human rights, and basic dignity." BBC News said this "would rescind previous policy created under Barack Obama which adopted a broader definition of gender." The open letter signatories included nine Nobel Prize laureates.

Mika Tosca, an assistant professor of climate science at the School of the Art Institute of Chicago, told BuzzFeed News, "As a trans woman and as a scientist, [the Trump administration proposal is] inherently an attack on my humanity, my ability to exist in the world, and to safely navigate certain spaces," and "It was really important that we gather as many scientists as we could to say that so scientists ourselves were not complicit in promoting this wholly flawed nonscientific effort." The New York Times wrote that the Trump administration proposal, if implemented, "would be acutely felt in schools and their most visible battlegrounds: locker rooms and bathrooms."

== Organizations ==
International organizations such as GATE and World Professional Association for Transgender Health (WPATH) work specifically towards transgender rights.

Other national level organizations also work for transgender rights, such as: in the United States, the National Center for Transgender Equality (NCTE), GenderPAC, Sylvia Rivera Law Project, the Transgender Law Center, and in the U.K., The Gender Trust, Trans Media Watch, and Press for Change.

== Religions ==
=== Reform Judaism ===
In 2015, the American Union for Reform Judaism adopted a Resolution on the Rights of Transgender and Gender Non-Conforming People, urging clergy and synagogue attendants to promote tolerance and inclusion of such individuals actively.

== In popular culture ==
=== Major events ===
Carey Purcell states that these moments have been key to bringing awareness to the transgender movement and fight for transgender rights.

- Renée Richards sues the US Open to play as a woman after sex reassignment surgery, 1976
- Paris is Burning is released depicting the lives of Latino, African-American, gay and transgender communities and drag ball competitions in New York, 1991
- Boys Don't Cry wins acclaim and Oscar, 1999
- Alexis Arquette appears on The Surreal Life, 2006
- Candis Cayne appears on Dirty Sexy Money, 2007
- Isis King is the first trans model on America's Next Top Model, 2008
- Chaz Bono announces he will be transitioning from female to male, 2009
- Kye Allums is the first openly transgender NCAA athlete, 2010
- Miss Universe allows transgender women to compete, 2012
- Laverne Cox is the first transgender person to appear on Time magazine, 2014
- Transparent wins a Golden Globe, 2015
- Caitlyn Jenner interviews with Diane Sawyer, shedding light on her transition experience, 2015
- Jazz Jennings is the youngest transgender person to become a pop culture icon, first interviewed by Barbra Walters at the age of six, 2007
- Gottmik becomes the first transgender male to compete on reality television series RuPaul's Drag Race (Season 13) 2021

=== Representation in media ===
Representation in pop culture has major effects on both the transgender and cisgender communities. In addition to the above list, Wendy Carlos, synthesizer player and recording artist, in 1979 announced that she had been living at least 11 years as a woman, and that she had undergone reassignment surgery. Elizabeth Tisdell and Patricia Thompson conducted a study on the effects of representation in the media on teachers and its effect on the way they teach in the classroom. This study found that when teachers had been exposed to programming that featured diverse characters in a positive light, teachers were more open to teaching their students in a more open, accepting way. In this study, the authors found that media reinforces the values of the dominant culture, and is one of the most powerful ways to informally educate people. Tisdell and Thompson state that this representation is a way in which people construct ideas of themselves and others, and that more representation lends legitimacy to identities and movements such as the transgender movement.

In a separate study, GLAAD looked at the representation of transgender characters in the media over the last ten years. After examining many different episodes and storylines, GLAAD found that transgender characters were cast in a "victim" role in 40% of the catalogued episodes, and were cast as killers or victims in 21% of the episodes. They also found that the most common profession of transgender characters in the episodes was sex workers, seen in about 20% of the episodes. In addition to the representation of transgender characters, the authors found that anti-transgender slurs, language, and dialogue were present in at least 61% of the episodes.

Activists within the transgender rights movement argue that representation such as these set the movement back in gaining understanding within mainstream society. Jayce Montgomery is a trans man who argues that these types of representation "always displaying [transgender people] in the stereotypical way. You know, 'masculine,' [or] this is the man/this is the woman role. And not really delving into their background and what they actually go through." In the same conversation, Stacey Rice goes on in the same conversation with Bitch Media to make the point that well known transgender celebrities are not representative of the general transgender community's experiences. Rice then goes on to say that while these celebrities are not representative of the average transgender person's experience, the visibility they bring to the transgender rights movement does nothing but help the cause.

=== Personalities ===
Many celebrities have spoken out in support of transgender rights and often in conjunction with overall support for the LGBTQ community. Numerous celebrities voice such support for the Human Rights Campaign, including Archie Panjabi, Lance Bass, Tituss Burgess, Chelsea Clinton, George Clooney, Tim Cook, Jesse Tyler Ferguson, Sally Field, Lady Gaga, Whoopi Goldberg, Anne Hathaway, Jennifer Hudson, Caitlyn Jenner, Jazz Jennings, Elton John, Cyndi Lauper, Jennifer Lopez, Demi Lovato, Natasha Lyonne, Elliot Page, Brad Pitt, Geena Rocero, Bruce Springsteen, Jeffrey Tambor, Charlize Theron, Miley Cyrus, and Lana Wachowski.

Magnus Hirschfeld was a German physician and advocate for sexual minorities. Much of his medical research was on sexuality, specifically homosexuality. He was one of the earliest to suggest that homosexuality was innate. Along with Max Spohr, Franz Josef von Bülow, and Eduard Oberg, he founded the Scientific-Humanitarian Committee in 1897, which is considered to be the first gay rights organization. Hirschfield also established the Institute for Sexual Research, which would go on to perform the first modern vaginoplasties by 1930. Unfortunately, most of his books and research were burned by the Nazis.

In the same vein, Harry Benjamin German-American sexologist, author of The Transsexual Phenomenon was a supporter of transgender rights and helped establish the medical procedures and Standards of Care for transgender persons in the United States.

==== Laverne Cox ====
Orange Is the New Black actress Laverne Cox has been particularly outspoken about the importance of transgender rights. Being transgender herself, Cox has experienced firsthand the issues that surround those who are transgender and often uses her own story to promote the movement for transgender rights. She sees her fame as an opportunity to bring awareness to causes that matter and that her unique position legitimizes the transgender rights movement. Particularly, she believes that transgender individuals have been historically overlooked and sidelined not just socially, but in the fight for civil rights as well. Cox acknowledges the progress that has been made for Gay rights, but that it is important to focus on transgender rights separately, seeing as it has historically been grouped together with other causes and used as an umbrella term. In 2014, Glamour magazine named Cox Woman of the Year in recognition of her activism.

==== Caitlyn Jenner ====
In April 2015, Olympic gold medalist and reality TV star Caitlyn Jenner came out as transgender. The news had been speculated for months leading up to the announcement, but still shocked the public and received considerable attention. Jenner expressed the desire to transition and to be known as Caitlyn Jenner and introduced herself for the first time on the cover of Vanity Fair. Jenner's transition has been documented by the short-lived reality television series titled I am Cait. Jenner was determined to make a difference and bring awareness to transgender rights, believing that telling her story could do so. Jenner did increase transgender visibility; however, her commentary and series were criticized for misrepresenting the struggles of the majority of the trans community, who are much less privileged than she and face deeper problems.

Jenner has been sharply criticized by many activists in the transgender rights movement for stating her opinion in an interview with TMZ that trans girls should not be allowed to compete in girls' sports at school, backing Republican Party views on transgender people in sports. Her comments lead to criticism amongst the trans and broader LGBTQ+ community; some advocates have questioned Jenner's status as a trans activist, saying that "[Jenner] did not represent the broader LGBT community".

==== Janet Mock ====
Janet Mock is an author, activist, and TV show host who advocates transgender rights, sex workers' rights, and more among marginalized communities. Mock uses storytelling as a way to diminish stigma of marginalized communities. She has authored and edited many works addressing her personal struggles as well as exploring various social issues affecting various communities. Mock acknowledged in an interview that her experience alone does not speak for all in the transgender community, but it can provide a platform for some to reflect upon.

She addressed and encouraged intersectionality and inclusiveness in the feminist movement at the 2017 Women's March.

== Notable transgender activists ==
A list of notable transgender activists, listed in alphabetical order by surname.

- Tamara Adrián, the first openly transgender woman to be elected to office in Venezuela.
- Donnie Anderson, American Baptist minister and LGBTQ activist who is a transgender woman
- Carla Antonelli, Spanish actress and politician who was the first openly transgender person to participate in Spain's legislature. She is currently the first transgender member of parliament (2011) and the first female senator in Spain (2023), still in office.
- Jenny Bailey, Cambridge, UK mayor who is also married to a transgender partner.
- Georgina Beyer, former New Zealand politician who was the first openly transgender mayor and the first transgender politician to become a member of Parliament in the world.
- Gianna Camacho, Peruvian journalist and trans activist
- Elie Che, British model and trans activist; she became an international cultural focus due to her early death.
- Aaron Devor, Canadian sociologist and founder of the Transgender Archives and Moving Trans History Forward conferences.
- Trinidad Falcés, first openly transgender person in A Coruña and victim of the Francoist dictatorship
- Anna Grodzdka, a Polish politician and the first openly transgender person to be elected as an MP in Europe.
- Jamie Lee Hamilton, the first transgender person who ran for office in Canada.
- Erika Hilton and Duda Salabert, Brazil's first transgender Congresspeople.
- Kim Coco Iwamoto, Hawaii's Civil Rights Commissioner and former member of the Board of Education.
- Aya Kamikawa and Tomoya Hosoda, Japan's first openly transgender politicians.
- Mason J. Dunn, a prominent Jewish transmasculine nonbinary attorney and policy advocate in New England.
- Shabnam Mausi, the first transgender person in India to be elected for public office.
- Sarah McBride, Delaware State Senator from Senate District 1, is the first openly transgender person elected to any state Senate in the United States in 2020. She was later elected as the representative of Delaware-at-large in the House of Representatives, making her the first openly transgender member of Congress.
- Micheline Montreuil, Canadian politician, lawyer, and transgender rights activist.
- Luisa Revilla Urcia, the first openly transgender woman to be elected to office in Uruguay.
- Geraldine Roman, the first openly transgender woman to be elected to Congress in the Philippines.
- Lauren Scott, US LGBTQ activist who ran for Nevada Assembly as a Republican.
- Amanda Simpson, US Deputy Assistant Secretary of Defense for Operational Energy and the highest-ranking openly transgender appointee in the United States.
- Nikki Sinclaire, former member of the European Parliament.
- Michelle Suaréz, the first openly transgender woman to be elected to office in Uruguay.
- Brianna Titone, Colorado State Representative from HD27, is the first openly transgender person elected in 2018 and reelected in 2020.
- Brianna Westbrook, a US democratic socialist politician and Vice Chair of the Arizona Democratic Party.
- Kate Lynn Blatt, Civil Rights Activist, first transgender person to sue under the Americans with disabilities act (ADA). In (Blatt vs Cabela's Retail inc).

== See also ==
- Anti-gender movement
- Outline of transgender topics
- Transgender flag
