= Transgender Archives at the University of Victoria =

Archives at the University of Victoria, Canada

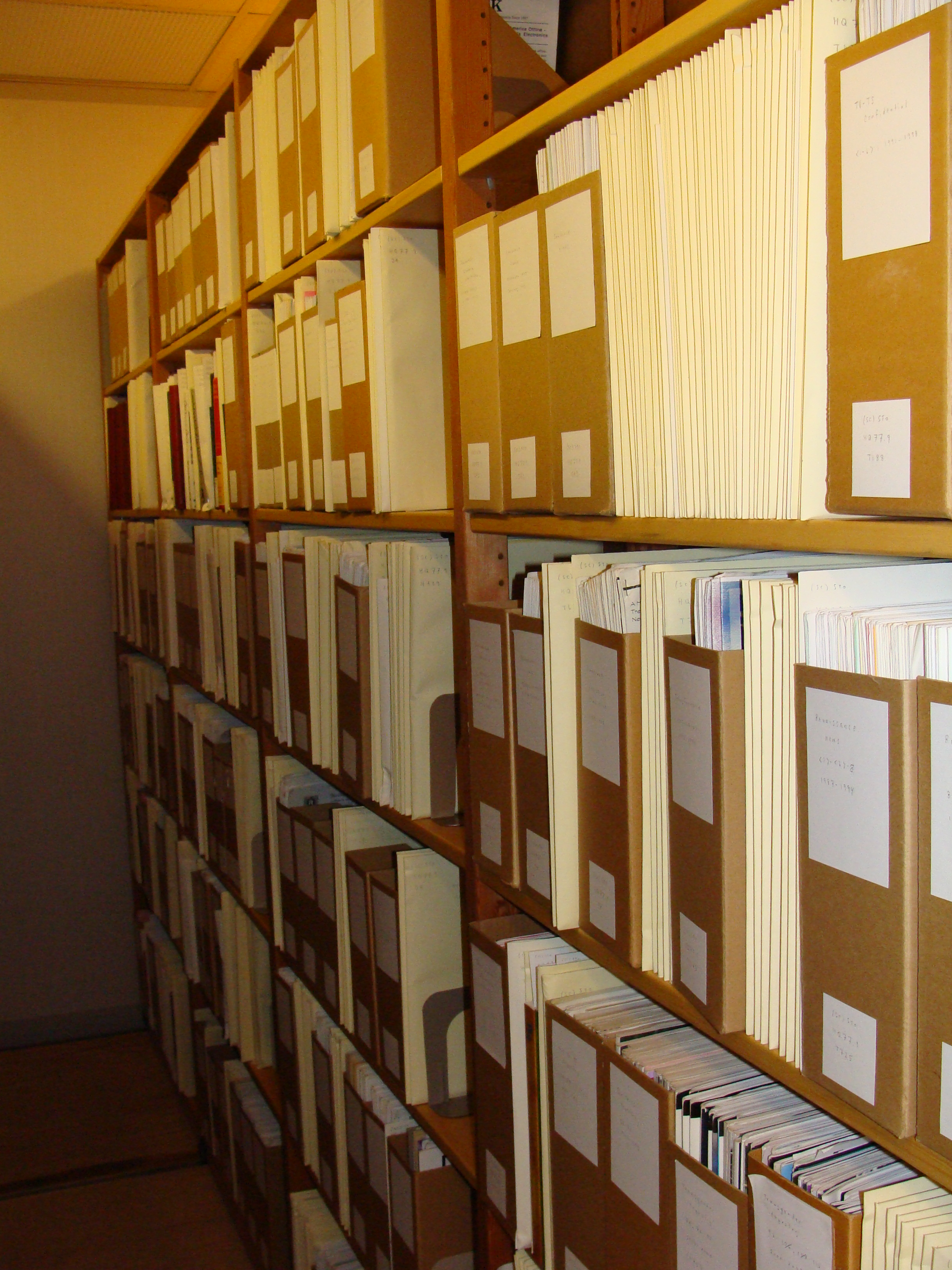
- Location: 3800 Finnerty Road; Victoria, British Columbia V8P 5C2
- Scope: Trans, non-binary, Two-Spirit
- Established: 2007

Collection
- Size: 162 linear metres (531 ft)
- Criteria for collection: Material contributions of activists and researchers working for the betterment of trans, non-binary, and Two-Spirit people

Other information
- Director: Lara Wilson; Aaron Devor (academic)
- Website: www.uvic.ca/transgenderarchives/

The Transgender Archives at the University of Victoria is the "largest transgender archive in the world".

The collection is located at the University of Victoria Libraries, Special Collections and University Archives (Mearns Centre for Learning), in Victoria, British Columbia, Canada. It is coordinated by founder and subject matter expert Aaron H. Devor, inaugural chair in Transgender Studies, and managed by director of Special Collections and university archivist, Lara Wilson.

All holdings of the Transgender Archives are accessible to the public, free of charge, for personal research, investigation, and exploration.

== History ==
While there are numerous lesbian, gay, bisexual and trans, or LGBT archival collections in North America, only a few exclusively feature trans, non-binary, and Two-Spirit material.

The genesis of the Transgender Archives occurred in 2005 with a conversation between the founder of the archives, Aaron Devor, and Rikki Swin. Rikki Swin is a one-time Chicago manufacturer of plastic injection moulding and founder of the Rikki Swin Institute. She moved to Victoria in 2007.

The discussion led Swin to donate her institute's entire material holdings to the University of Victoria Libraries' Archives and Special Collections. Swin's founding donation is one of three major donations held in the archives.

The second major donation of material occurred when the daughter of Reed Erickson donated her father's extensive papers to the archives. Erickson, founder of the Erickson Educational Foundation, died in 1992.

The third major donation occurred when Professor Richard Ekins donated the entire University of Ulster (Northern Ireland, UK) Trans-Gender Archive.

Officially opening in 2011, the Transgender Archives at the University of Victoria has gathered other smaller donations and has grown to be "exceptional in its focus, size, and scope" due to its unique position as being one of the only archives in the world that institutionally houses material exclusively reflecting trans, non-binary, and Two-Spirit experiences.

Libraries and the LGBTQ community lists the Transgender Archives in their List of LGBTQ Archives/Libraries/Special Collections as one of the only archival institutions that exclusively houses trans material.

== Collection ==
The Transgender Archives at the University of Victoria contains archival material from both large and small trans organizations and focuses on the contributions of activists and researchers working for the betterment of trans people.

While the archive currently emphasizes collections from North America and Europe, the materials go back over 120 years, and are in 15 languages from 23 countries on six continents. If the materials were lined up on one long shelf, the collection would stretch the length of one-and-a-half football fields.

Holdings include: approximately 2,000 books, including many rare and first editions; large collection of informational pamphlets and booklets produced by advocacy organizations for educational purposes; historical and organizational records for several significant trans activist groups including personal papers from some leaders; international newsletters from trans communities; multimedia collection representing and recording trans experiences; and a large collection of ephemera.

At approximately 162 linear metres (531 ft) of books, periodicals, and archival materials, the collection is the "largest trans-focused archival collection in the world".

Approximately twenty-five percent of the collection is cataloged, with sixty percent of the collection reflecting male-to-female experiences.

While the archives are accessible to the public free of charge, key documents are slowly being made available online (see external links).

== List of the archives' largest collections ==
- Rikki Swin
- Ari Kane/Fantasia Fair
- barbara findlay. Q.C. / Kimberly Nixon
- Betty Ann Lind
- International Foundation for Gender Education
- Merissa Sherrill Lynn
- Reed Erickson
- Stephanie Castle / Zenith Foundation
- University of Ulster TGA collection
- Virginia Prince
- Aiyyana Maracle
- Red Jordan Arobateau

== Publications ==
In 2014, founder and subject matter expert Aaron H. Devor published the book The Transgender Archives: Foundations for the Future, featuring the collection of the Transgender Archives. The publication was a finalist in the 27th Lambda Literary Awards ("Lammys") in the category of "LGBT nonfiction".

== Moving Trans History Forward conferences ==
Moving Trans History Forward conferences are a series of international conferences, founded and led by the University of Victoria's Chair in Transgender Studies and the founder and subject matter expert of the Transgender Archives. The conferences draw community activists, researchers, educators, artists, service providers, and allies of all ages from around the world. Conferences consider the history of trans activism and research, and the issues which impact trans, non-binary, and Two-Spirit people today – locally, nationally, and globally.

The first conference, held at the University of Victoria, March 21–23, 2014, was entitled "Moving Trans* History Forward". Researchers and activists gathered to retrieve and preserve the stories and records of transgender pioneers of the early 1960s onwards.

The second conference, entitled "Moving Trans History Forward: Building Communities – Sharing Connections", took place at the University of Victoria, March 17–20, 2016. Keynote speakers included Kael McKenzie, baritone opera singer, Lucia Lucas and Tobias Picker, composer of the biographical opera Lili Elbe in which Lucia Lucas starred as Lili Elbe. It has been hailed as the largest transgender conference in Canadian history. Trans and gender non-conforming (GNC) community-based scholars and activists, academics, archivists, librarians, family members, and allies of trans and GNC people explored preserving and recounting the history of trans and GNC people and communities in all eras and regions of the world. Events included: keynote speakers Jamison Green and Martine Rothblatt, oral presentations, posters, art exhibits, a feature-length trans-themed film (Two 4 One), panel discussions with founders of trans activism and research.

The third conference, entitled "Moving Trans History Forward: From Generation to Generation", took place at the University of Victoria March 22–25, 2018. The conference registered 300 people from 11 countries in Asia, Europe, North America, and the Middle East, and drew 600 people to the largest event. Kent Monkman, a Canadian Cree Two-Spirit artist, delivered one of the keynote addresses, with Andrea Jenkins, the first openly transgender Black woman elected to public office in the U.S., presenting the second keynote address.

The fourth iteration of the Moving Trans History Forward conference was held online, from March 11 to 14, 2021. Originally, the conference was scheduled to take place in Victoria, BC, from April 2 to 5, 2020, at the Victoria Conference Centre but was moved online due to the COVID-19 pandemic. 379 people from 23 countries were registered for the conference. Blas Radi, the cofounder of the world's second chair in Transgender Studies, was the first keynote speaker. Miss Major, a long-time activist and trans woman of colour, was the second keynote speaker. There were both youth and elder panels, where speakers discussed issues faced by their respective age groups.

The fifth Moving Trans History Forward conference, occurring between March 30 and April 2, 2023, was the first to be presented in a hybrid format, happening both in person at the University of Victoria and online. The conference drew the largest attendance yet, with 470 people registered from 23 different countries. Keynote speakers included author and activist Julia Serano; and Chase Joynt, Jen Richards, Morgan M Page, and Jules Gill-Peterson from the film Framing Agnes.

The sixth Moving Trans History Forward conference continued in hybrid format and took place between March 27 and March 30, 2025, with over 125 speakers hosted. This iteration marked just over 10 years since the founding of the conference. Dallas Denny, Jamieson Green and Jennifer Pritzker spoke at the opening reception. A decline in attendees was noted, thought to be a result of anti-trans legislation pushed by the second administration of U.S President Donald J. Trump.
