= Moving Trans History Forward conferences =

Series of conferences held in Victoria, Canada

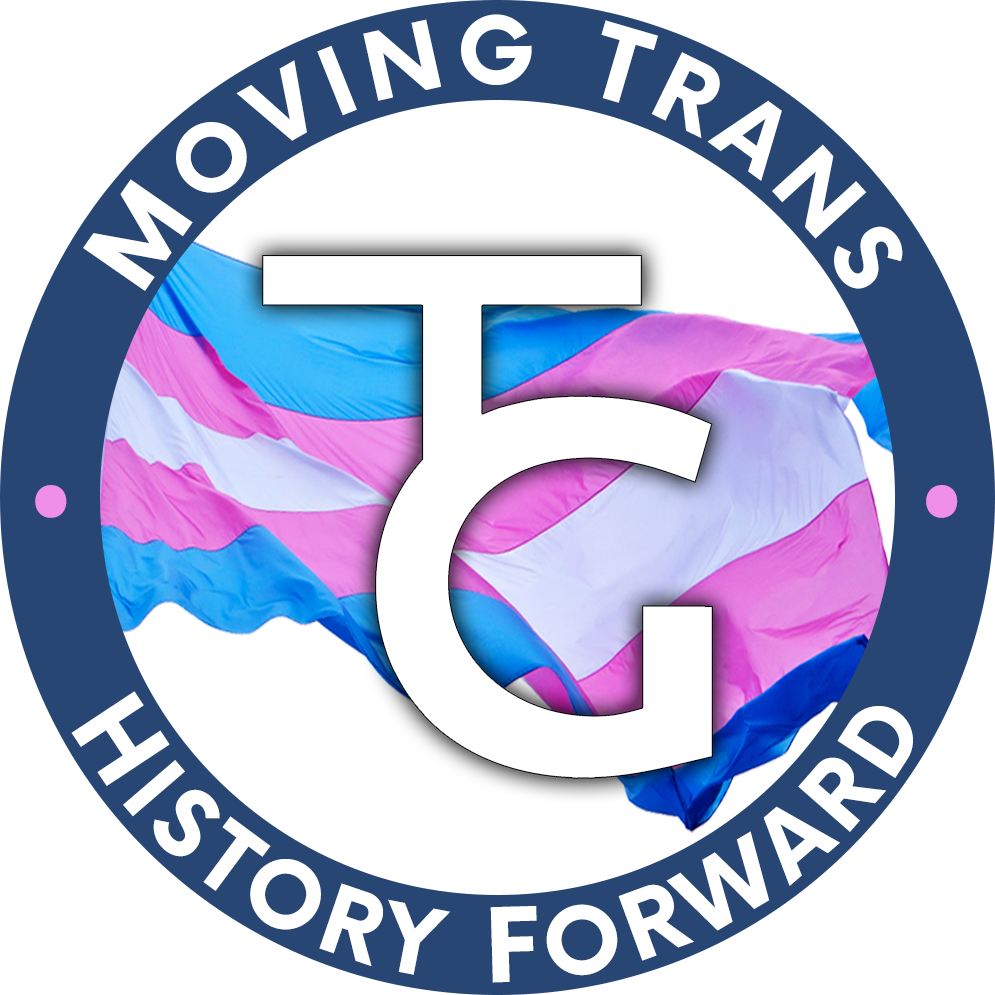
Moving Trans History Forward 2023 logo

Moving Trans History Forward is a series of interdisciplinary, international, and intergenerational conferences held in Victoria, British Columbia, Canada, at the University of Victoria, hosted by the Chair in Transgender Studies. The conferences discuss trans history and activism, and are open to both academics and the general public. The conferences also explore new trans research and the issues that impact trans, non-binary, Two-spirit, and other gender nonconforming (GNC) people.

== History ==
The biennial conference was founded and hosted by the University of Victoria's Chair in Transgender Studies and the founder and subject matter expert of the Transgender Archives, Aaron Devor. Beginning in 2014, the conference has gathered community activists, researchers, educators, archivists, artists, service providers, and allies of all ages.

== Past conferences ==
=== Moving Trans* History Forward (2014) ===
The first conference, held at the University of Victoria from March 21 to 23, 2014, was entitled "Moving Trans* History Forward". Around 100 trans activists and researchers, as well as allies, gathered to preserve and present the stories and records of trans pioneers from the early 1960s onwards. Events included keynote speakers Jennifer Pritzker, Vivian Namaste, Susan Stryker, and Dallas Denny; oral presentations, symposiums, displayed materials, and a featured screening of the film Trans.

=== Moving Trans History Forward: Building Communities – Sharing Connections (2016) ===
The second conference, entitled "Moving Trans History Forward: Building Communities – Sharing Connections", took place at the University of Victoria from March 17 to 20, 2016. Events included keynote speakers Jamison Green and Martine Rothblatt, oral presentations, posters, art exhibits, a screening of Mo Bradley's feature-length film Two 4 One, and Founders Panel discussions with Rupert Raj, Jason Cromwell, Jamie Lee Hamilton, and Yvonne Cook-Riley.

=== Moving Trans History Forward: From Generation to Generation (2018) ===
The third conference, entitled "Moving Trans History Forward: From Generation to Generation", took place at the University of Victoria from March 22 to 25, 2018. Keynote speakers included Andrea Jenkins, the first openly transgender Black woman elected to public office in the United States, and Kent Monkman, a Canadian Cree Two-spirit artist. Among oral presentations, art displays, and workshops, there were both youth and elder panels, where speakers discussed topics relating to their respective age groups.

=== Moving Trans History Forward (2021) ===
The fourth iteration of the Moving Trans History Forward conference was held online, from March 11 to 14, 2021. The conference was initially scheduled to take place in Victoria, BC, from April 2 to 5, 2020, at the Victoria Conference Centre but was moved online due to the COVID-19 pandemic. The first keynote speaker was Blas Radi, cofounder of the world's second Chair in Transgender Studies at the University of Buenos Aires. The second keynote speaker was Miss Major in conversation with Kelendria Nation and Syrus Marcus Ware. The program included oral presentations, panel discussions, and youth and elder panels.

=== Moving Trans History Forward (2023) ===
The fifth Moving Trans History Forward conference took place between March 30 and April 2, 2023, and was presented in a hybrid format, occurring both online and in person at the University of Victoria. On March 31, 2023, the conference coincided with International Transgender Day of Visibility. Keynote speakers were author and activist Julia Serano; and Chase Joynt, Jen Richards, Morgan M Page, and Jules Gill-Peterson from the film Framing Agnes. The conference included oral presentations, panel discussions, poster sessions, and workshops. The program included a Two-Spirit Trans+ Panel, a youth panel, and an elders panel.

=== Moving Trans History Forward (2025) ===
Moving Trans History Forward 2025 was the sixth iteration and the second conference held in a hybrid format – both online and in person – at the University of Victoria, from March 27 to 30, 2025. This conference marked just over 10 years since the founding of the Moving Trans History Forward conferences and featured Dallas Denny, Jamison Green, and retired U.S. lieutenant colonel Jennifer Pritzker as speakers at the opening reception. Jennifer Pritzker's Tawani Foundation provided the foundational donation of $1 million to the host organization, the Chair in Transgender Studies, in 2016. This conference faced challenges due to the anti-trans policies of the second administration of U.S. president Donald Trump and saw a decline in attendees. Keynote speakers included Kael McKenzie, the worlds first trans-masculine judge, and Lucia Lucas, the first recognized transgender woman to sing a principle role on an American operatic stage, who discussed excerpts from the biographical opera Lili Elbe with its composer, Tobias Picker.
