= Zenith Foundation =

The Zenith Foundation was founded by author and activist Stephanie Castle in 1992 in Vancouver, Canada, along with Christine Burnham, and Patricia Diewold, a clinical psychologist from the Provincial Gender Clinic at Vancouver General Hospital. The foundation started out as a support and advocacy group for transgender rights and also has an active focus on publishing educational pamphlets for the transgender community.

== History ==
Zenith was founded in 1993. A major objective of the organization was fighting for gender identity rights and provision of the same rights and benefits of other LGBT groups for transgender people.

Two members of the group formed the High Risk Project Society of Canada, an organization that organizes educational seminars on gender identity and provides support to the ostracized segment of the transgender community in British Columbia.

== Publications ==
Zenith co-founder Stephanie Castle started the Zenith Newsletter and the Zenith Digest, as well as writing and publishing several titles concerning transsexualism and transgenderism. The Zenith Foundation Newsletter, which later took the form of a magazine, the Zenith Digest, was sent out primarily to transgender women and service providers in Vancouver, Vancouver Island, and the Okanagan as a part of membership. The digest aimed to reach governmental departments, organizations, and individuals concerned with transsexual and transgender issues, and was published from 1995 to 2002. Original copies of Zenith Digest can be found at the Transgender Archives in Victoria, British Columbia. At the peak of its publication, the digest reached 200 members and was circulated in almost every Canadian province, reaching as far as the United States, the United Kingdom, New Zealand, and Australia.

The first Zenith Foundation Newsletter was drafted on June 30, 1993, and finalized on July 30, 1993, in order to share the proceedings from the first Zenith Foundation meeting with members unable to attend due to distance, or because of concerns about discretion. Held in the Gender Dysphoria Clinic at Vancouver General Hospital on June 24, 1993, the meeting had an unexpected turnout of 47 attendees, including organizers Stephanie Castle (President), Christine Burnham (Chairperson), Barbara Hammond (Secretary), Andrea Richard, Register, Debbie Brady, Trustee.

Initially, the editor indicated a newsletter would be available quarterly to communicate with members, as well as a brochure with "educational material on different subjects of interest to the transsexual community" available for purchase. To protect the identity of Zenith Foundation Members, the newsletter also stipulates publications and materials from the foundation should be kept private, so as to prevent "unneeded interest on the part of the media". As such, there is little information about the Zenith Foundation's publications available online.
