= Chair in Transgender Studies at the University of Victoria =

Transgender-focused research chair in Canada

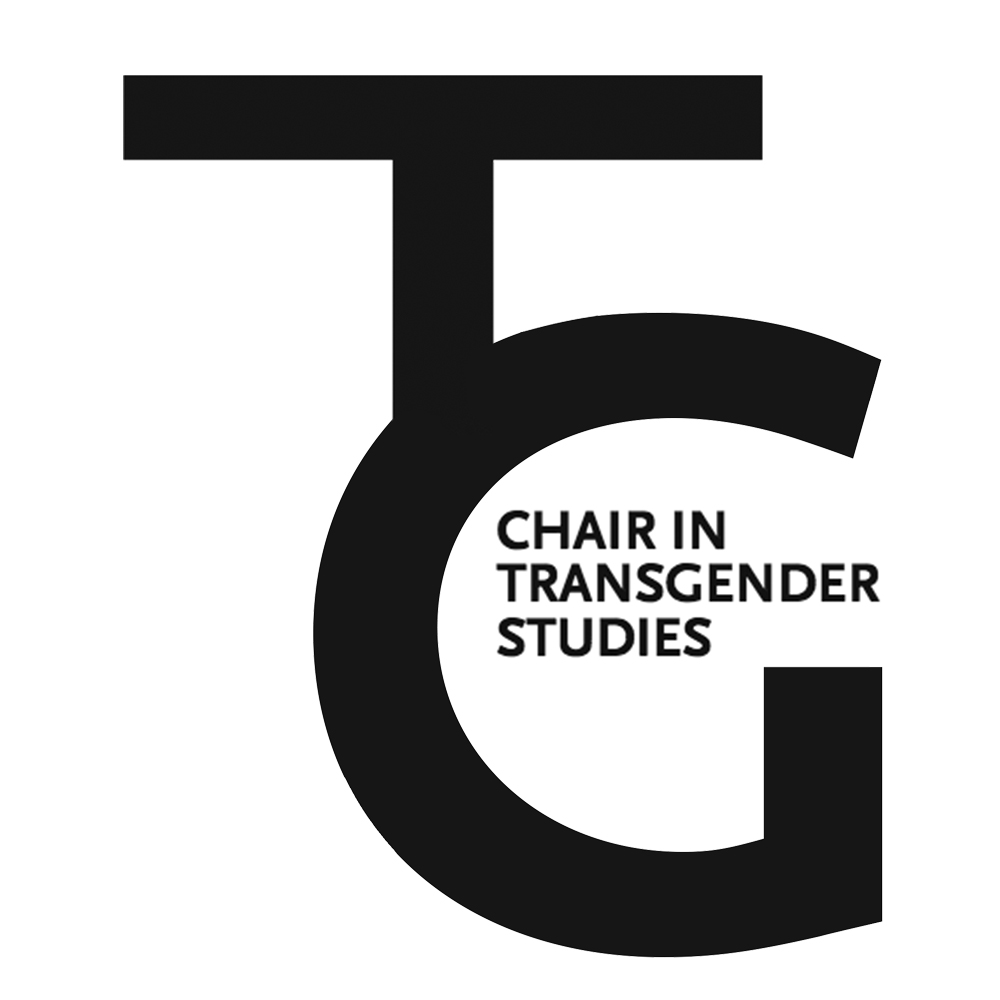
Chair in Transgender Studies at the University of Victoria logo

The Chair in Transgender Studies is the world's first research chair focused on the study of transgender individuals, issues, and history. It is housed at the University of Victoria, located in Victoria, British Columbia, Canada. Unlike any other university department chair at the University of Victoria, the Chair in Transgender Studies is self-funded through philanthropy and private donations. The chair is unique in that it does not grant degrees, but instead works with both community and academic communities to further the advancement of transgender studies. As of July 1st, 2026, the current chair is Jules Gill-Peterson. She is the author of Histories of the Transgender Child (2018), A Short History of Trans Misogyny (2024) and was an associate professor of history from Johns Hopkins University. She specializes in Transgender, medical and political history. The chair focuses on four pillars: original research, continued scholarship, maintenance and growth of the Transgender Archives, and organization of Canada's largest international transgender conference, Moving Trans History Forward.

== History ==
Established in 2016, the Chair in Transgender Studies was the recipient of a $1 million donation from the Tawani Foundation to aid in its creation and growth. The Tawani foundation, created by retired US Army Veteran Jennifer Pritzker further pledged an extra $1 million to match other donations to the Chair. The inaugural chair was Aaron Devor, a professor of sociology and former dean of Graduate Studies at the University of Victoria who works with researchers, community members, academics, and advocates to advance the study of Trans+ scholarship. Devor is also the founder and subject matter expert of the Transgender Archives, which is housed at the University of Victoria.

== Programming and activities ==
=== Research and scholarship ===
In order to support continued research on Trans+ issues and history, the chair offers scholarships and fellowships for researchers of trans-related topics, and for self-identified trans, non-binary, Two-spirit, and other gender-nonconforming individuals studying any topic. Though many of the awards are scholarships for academic researchers and students, the chair does not limit its funding to only those within academia, offering fellowships to support members of the community who are involved in trans activism and education.

The chair hosts a public lecture series featuring speakers from various scholarly backgrounds for, by, and about Trans+ individuals. Notable speakers who have given talks include researcher and professor Susan Stryker; web-comic artist Sophie Labelle; and artist, scholar, and founding member of Toronto's Black Lives Matter, Syrus Marcus Ware.

=== Transgender Archives ===
The Transgender Archives is located at the University of Victoria Libraries, Special Collections, and Archive. Established in 2012 by Aaron Devor and archivist Lara Wilson, it is the largest collection of trans specific material in the world. The collection spans over 160 meters (530 ft), goes back over 120 years, and is in 15 languages from 23 countries on 6 continents. The archive is open to the public, free of charge.

=== Moving Trans History Forward conferences ===
Moving Trans History Forward is a series of international conferences held bi-yearly in Victoria, BC. It is founded and organized by the Chair in Transgender Studies and the subject matter expert of the Transgender Archives. The first conference was held from March 21 to 23, 2014; the second from March 17 to 20, 2016; and the third from March 22 to 25, 2018; all at the University of Victoria campus. The 2020 conference was postponed to March 11 to 14, 2021, and hosted online. The 2023 conference was the first hybrid version, happening both in person at the University of Victoria and online, between March 30 and April 2, 2023. The 2025 conference took place between March 27 and 30, 2025 and was also hosted in a hybrid format.

The conferences aim to create an inclusive platform for individuals to learn about Trans+ history and activism, as well as explore new findings in trans research and the variety of issues that impact trans, non-binary, Two-Spirit, and other gender-nonconforming people across the world. The conference is not strictly academic, offering presentations by community members, artists, and activists, as well as being open to the public. Moving Trans History Forward is one of the largest conferences of its kind in North America, bringing in upwards of 450 participants in 2023.
