= Barbara findlay =

Canadian lawyer and LGBT rights activist (1949–2026)

barbara findlay KC
- Born: barbara j. findlay May 4, 1949; Regina, Saskatchewan, Canada
- Died: August 22, 2026 (aged 77); Vancouver, British Columbia, Canada
- Education: Queen's University (BA); University of British Columbia (MA, LLB)
- Occupation: Lawyer
- Known for: LGBT rights activism
- Website: www.barbarafindlay.com

barbara j. findlay (Note: Her name is stylized without capitals.) KC (May 4, 1949 – August 22, 2026) was a Canadian lawyer, feminist, educator and activist whose career was focused on equality, human rights and social justice. For more than four decades, she used the law, advocacy, education and community organizing to challenge discrimination and expand the rights of women, lesbians, gay men, and transgender people.

== Early life and education ==
Born in Regina, Saskatchewan, on May 4, 1949, barbara j. findlay was raised working class in a Christian family on the Canadian prairies, and attended Queen's University in Kingston, Ontario. During her university years, she came to understand that she was attracted to women. In the social and medical climate of the time, homosexuality was still widely regarded as a psychiatric disorder. findlay was involuntarily confined in a psychiatric institution, an experience that profoundly influenced her understanding of institutional power and the consequences of treating difference as pathology.

In 1970, findlay encountered second-wave feminism. It provided her with a framework for understanding her own experience and the broader structures of inequality around her. She subsequently studied sociology and law at the University of British Columbia, earning an M.A. in sociology and an LLB.

== Career ==
findlay was called to the bar in 1977. She began practising law soon after Canada's decriminalization of homosexuality.

Her early legal career included labour law and legal aid work, including with the Legal Services Society. She also taught in the Faculty of Law at the University of British Columbia. Over time, her legal practice increasingly focused on equality rights and the legal concerns of lesbian, gay, bisexual and transgender people.

She became deeply involved in feminist legal advocacy. She became active in the Women's Legal Education and Action Fund and the Alliance of Women Against Racism Etc. (AWARE).

During the 1990s and 2000s, findlay emerged as one of Canada's leading lawyers in cases involving sexual orientation and gender identity. She was a co-founder of the Sexual Orientation and Gender Identity Conference (SOGIC), the Canadian Bar Association's national and regional sections focused on sexual orientation and gender identity (now known as the Sexual and Gender Diversity Alliance), and a founding member of the December 9 Coalition.

Her work included litigation concerning same-sex marriage, recognition of same-sex parents, transgender prisoners, access to medical treatment and discrimination against transgender people. She also successfully established the right of non-biological co-mothers to be recognized as a parent on a child's birth certificate.

Among her most prominent cases was her representation of Kimberly Nixon, a transgender woman who challenged Vancouver Rape Relief after being excluded from its volunteer training program. The case became an important Canadian legal dispute concerning the relationship between transgender equality and women's organizations.

findlay also represented Synthia Kavanagh, a transgender prisoner, in litigation concerning gender-affirming medical treatment and placement in a women's correctional institution.

Her work extended well beyond the courtroom. Throughout her career, findlay combined litigation with public education, community organizing and political advocacy, grounded in the view that legal rights are most effective when connected to movements for social change.

She also led workshops at Room Magazine's literary festival, Growing Room. She is featured in the book Making Room: Forty Years of Room Magazine in the photo essay "The Cancer Year" (together with Dorothy Elias).

After she retired from ordinary legal practice in 2019, findlay remained active. She continued to participate in significant equality-rights litigation, advocate against the erosion of human rights through use of the notwithstanding clause, mentor younger 2SLGBTQIA+ lawyers and participate in community education. She was a co-founder of Lawyers Against Transphobia, a coalition committed to combating transphobia through legal action and public education.

findlay's life and career are chronicled in the documentary In particular, barbara findlay, directed by Becca Plucer.

Her papers are held by the Transgender Archives of the University of Victoria, preserving a substantial record of her legal and activist work and placing her career within the broader history of Canada's transgender-rights movement.

== Personal life and death ==
findlay lived with her partner of 35 years, Sheila Gilhooly, in Vancouver, British Columbia. She described herself as "a fat old white cisgender feminist lawyer with disabilities, raised working class and Christian".

After a long bout of myalgic encephalomyelitis, findlay opted for assisted dying and on August 22, 2026, she died in Vancouver at the age of 77.

== Awards ==
In 2001, findlay was designated Queen's Counsel (QC).

findlay was given an award of merit from the Sexual Diversity Studies Department at the University of Toronto.

In 2013, findlay was awarded a Queen's Diamond Jubilee Medal.

In 2021, she received the Georges Goyer Award, the highest award of the British Columbia branch of the Canadian Bar Association.

In 2022, she received the Louis St-Laurent Award of Excellence of the Canadian Bar Association, the highest award conferred on a CBA member in recognition of a lifetime of outstanding service and professional achievement to the benefit of the legal profession, the association and society at large.

In 2023, Simon Fraser University awarded findlay the degree of Doctor of Laws, honoris causa, the university's highest honour, conferred at the convocation ceremony of 7 June 2023.

In 2025, findlay was awarded the Canadian Bar Association British Columbia Branch President's Medal, which recognizes a significant contribution to the profession during the president's term.

== Sources ==
- Martinson, Donna (2016). On the Front Cover: barbara findlay, Q. C. (PDF). Vol. 74. The Advocate. Archived from the original (PDF) on January 27, 2022.
