= Aaron Devor =

Canadian sociologist (born 1951)

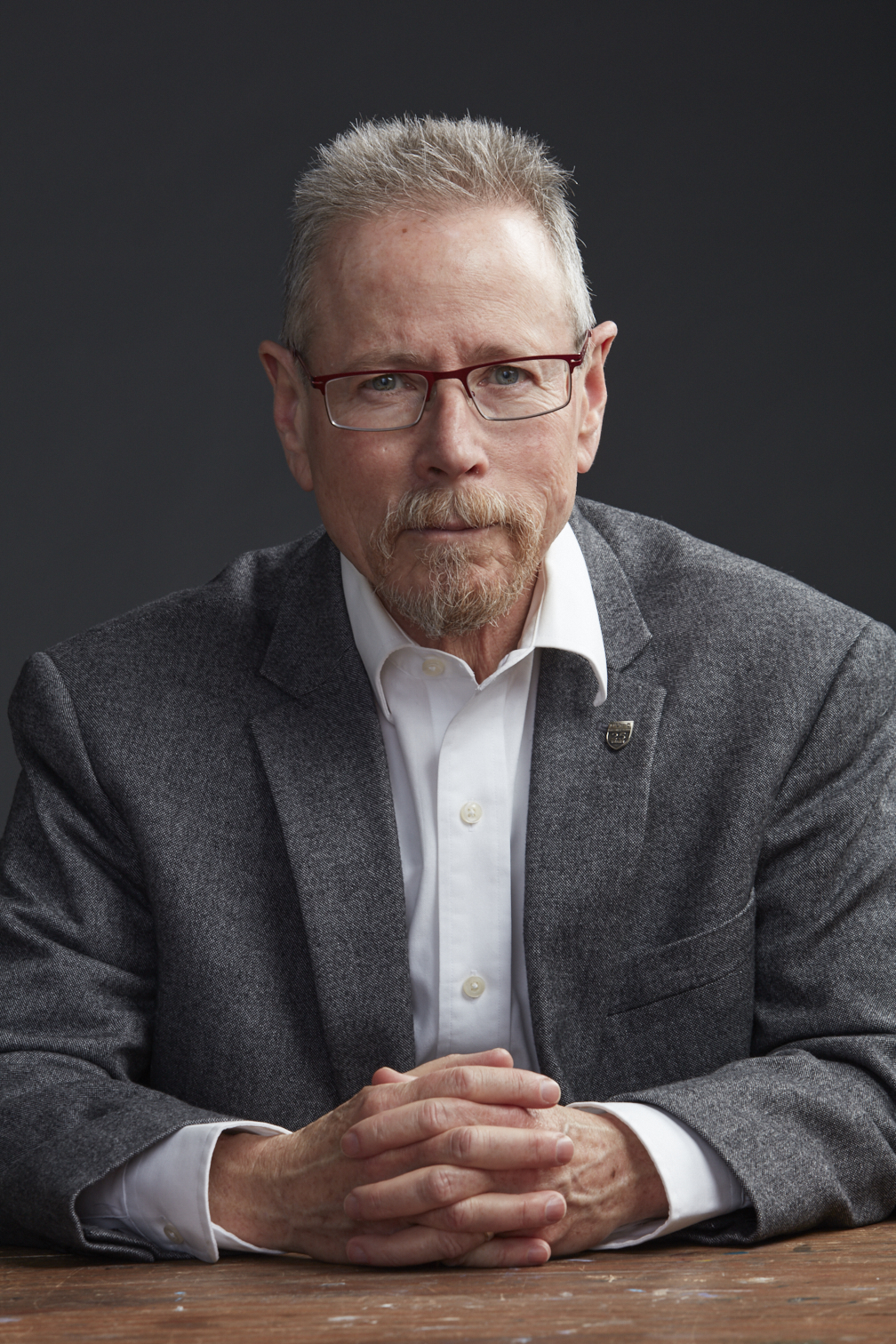
- Portrait of Aaron Devor by Blake Little (2020)
- Born: 1951 (age 74–75)
- Occupation: Sociologist
- Employer: University of Victoria
- Website: https://onlineacademiccommunity.uvic.ca/ahdevor/

Aaron H. Devor is a Canadian sociologist and sexologist known for his work in transgender studies. Devor has taught at the University of Victoria since 1989 and is the former dean of graduate studies. He was the inaugural Chair in Transgender Studies at the University of Victoria, and the founder and subject matter expert of the Transgender Archives at the University of Victoria. He started and hosted the Moving Trans History Forward conferences from 2014-2025. Maclean's described Devor as "an internationally respected expert on gender, sex and sexuality."

== Life and education ==
Devor earned a bachelor's degree in psychology from York University in 1971, a master's degree in communications from Simon Fraser University in 1985, and a Ph.D. in sociology from the University of Washington in 1990. A trans man, Devor transitioned in 2002 at age 51.

== Career ==
Devor is a member of the World Professional Association for Transgender Health, co-authoring the Standards of Care versions 6 and 7 and sitting on the Standards of Care revision committee since 2018. As of 2025, he is also chair of the Archives Committee.

He has collected many first-person narratives of transsexual experiences and has done extensive biographical research on Reed Erickson.

Devor's book, The Transgender Archives: Foundations for the Future, was a finalist for the Lambda Literary Award for Nonfiction in 2015.

In 2016, through the Tawani Foundation, Jennifer Pritzker gave a $2 million donation to create the world's first academic Chair in Transgender Studies, at the University of Victoria; Devor was chosen as the inaugural chair.

=== Selected publications ===
- Devor, A. & Wilson, M. (Eds.) (2019). "Glimmerings: Trans Elders Tell Their Stories". Transgender Publishings, ISBN 978-1775102748
- Devor, Aaron (2014). The Transgender Archives: Foundations for the Future. University of Victoria Libraries. ISBN 9781550585247. OCLC 870562499.
- Devor, A. H, & Matte, N (2004). "ONE Inc. and Reed Erickson: The Uneasy Collaboration of Gay and Trans Activism, 1964-2003." GLQ: A Journal of Gay and Lesbian Studies, 10(2), 179–209.
- Devor, H (1997). FTM: Female-to-Male Transsexuals in Society. Indiana University Press, Second Edition (2016) ISBN 978-0253022868
- Devor, A. & Haefeli-Thomas, A (2019). Transgender: A Reference Handbook. Bloomsbury Publishing, ISBN 978-1440856907
- Devor, H (1994). Transsexualism, Dissociation, and Child Abuse An Initial Discussion Based on Nonclinical Data. Journal of Psychology & Human Sexuality Volume: 6 Issue: 3
- Devor, H (1989). Gender Blending: Confronting the Limits of Duality. Indiana University Press, ISBN 978-0-253-20533-9 *889
