= Kimberly Nixon Rape Relief case =

Canadian legal case

Kimberly Nixon is a transgender woman who filed a human rights complaint against Vancouver Rape Relief & Women's Shelter Society (VRRS) for discrimination. VRRS argued that Nixon, a trans woman, did not have the same life experiences as a woman who was assigned female at birth (also known as a cis woman), and could not volunteer as a peer rape counselor. She brought her case to the British Columbia Human Rights Tribunal which ruled in her favour. VRRS opposed the decision, bringing it to the Supreme Court of British Columbia, which ruled against the original tribunal decision. Nixon then appealed to the British Columbia Court of Appeal, which upheld the decision in favour of VRRS, and then eventually the Supreme Court of Canada, which dismissed her request to appeal the decision against her case on February 1, 2007.

== Personal life ==
Nixon is a transgender woman. She was assigned male at birth, but realized from an early age that her physical sex did not align with her sense of self. She lived privately as a woman and publicly as a man until 1990, when at the age of 33, she underwent gender-affirming surgery and began hormone therapy. Following her surgery, Nixon’s birth certificate was amended to reflect her female gender.

As a survivor of male violence and sexual assault as a trans woman, Nixon had previously received aid and volunteered with Battered Women’s Support Service (BWSS) as well as another halfway house that helped women in crisis. Inspired by her own experience, Nixon applied to volunteer at Vancouver Rape Relief Society, a non-profit organization that provides services for women who have been victims of male violence. Following Nixon’s successful prescreening, she was rejected by Vancouver Rape Relief because she was trans.

== Human rights complaint ==
Nixon alleged that Vancouver Rape Relief discriminated against her in violation of the British Columbia Human Rights Code. The society argued that they didn’t allow males into the group and to qualify as a volunteer she must be a woman who experienced sex-based oppression from birth. They argued that Nixon was socialized a man and therefore did not have the life experiences of a woman. Other Rape Relief trainers supported this position, identifying Nixon as a man as justification for her rejection from the volunteer position.

In August 1995, Nixon filed a formal human rights complaint against VRRS. This resulted in Nixon receiving a formal letter apologizing for her exclusion, $500 in compensation, and an offer for an in-person apology. Nixon rejected these offers, and in 2000 the case went to the British Columbia Human Rights Tribunal. Nixon won at the Human Rights Tribunal on the grounds that the society discriminated against her and was awarded $7,500 for injury of self-respect and dignity. Vancouver Rape Relief Society brought the Tribunal’s decision for judicial review, arguing that discrimination was not present.

== Vancouver Rape Relief Society v. Nixon ==
In August 2003, the case was brought to the Supreme Court of British Columbia. The court was to decide "whether transgendered women are protected from discrimination on the basis of sex". The court debated gender, biological indicators against social, psychological, psychiatric and legal treatment. On December 19, 2003, the Supreme Court determined that there was an error in the decision made by the tribunal. It was ruled that Vancouver Rape Relief had not discriminated against Nixon because VRR’s right to freedom of association based on sex was protected under human rights law. This meant that the group had the right to organize as a female-only service, irrespective of gender identity.

Following this decision, Nixon appealed to the British Columbia Court of Appeal which unanimously upheld the decision by the Supreme Court of BC the Vancouver Rape Relief was protected under BC Human Rights Code Section 41(1). This allowed the society to abide by its cis women-only membership policy, based on its mandate to provide services to female victims of male violence. On February 1, 2007, the Supreme Court of Canada dismissed Nixon’s request to appeal the decision. Nixon was also ordered to cover the court costs of Vancouver Rape Relief, which Nixon has refused to pay.
