= Vancouver Rape Relief & Women's Shelter =

- Formation: 1973
- Type: Rape crisis center
- Headquarters: Vancouver, British Columbia, Canada
- Region served: Vancouver
- Website: www.rapereliefshelter.bc.ca

Vancouver Rape Relief & Women's Shelter is a Canadian rape crisis center located in Vancouver, British Columbia. The shelter was established in 1973 and has operated a feminist transition house since 1983, offering women shelter from men who are abusing them, including fathers, husbands, sons, pimps, johns and landlords. (Note: "Since 1973 the Vancouver Rape Relief and Women's Shelter has been an organizing centre and a 24-hour phone line for women raped and battered. Since 1980, it has also been a feminist transition house. We house women running from abusive men – usually husbands and fathers, but sometimes pimps, johns, landlords, and sons.") A member of the Canadian Association of Sexual Assault Centres (CASAC), it is an independent, non-governmental group with no connection to the criminal justice system.

== Services ==
The group operates a 24-hour, confidential, free-of-charge crisis hotline for abused women. More broadly, it works to eradicate all violence against women, which it defines as including "sexual assault, wife assault, incest, prostitution, and sexual harassment". According to its website, this mission is accomplished by not only providing housing, education, resources, and support for women, but also by participating in global political struggles around issues of race, class, colonialism, and imperialism.

Vancouver Rape Relief and Women's Shelter consists of 27 collective members who work at the shelter, ten of whom are staff. They are committed to having their membership represent Vancouver population and therefore have a third of women identifying as lesbian women, a third are working class women, and almost half of them identify as women of colour. Vancouver Rape Relief and Women's Shelter have stated publicly that their collective members are themselves survivors of male violence against women, ex-callers calling the line, ex-residents who lived at the shelter, and survivors of prostitution.

== Budget ==
The shelter has a total annual budget of around $1.1 million per year, of which approximately $600,000 is funded by the government of British Columbia.

In March 2019, the Vancouver City Council announced that it would stop awarding an annual $34,312 grant to the organisation and would not award future funding unless the organisation extended accommodations to transgender women. Vancouver councillor Christine Boyle commented, "To receive city funding, they need to be serving all women, and that includes trans women". Hilla Kerner of VRR stated that while the staff always makes sure any trans person who asks for their help is safe, "Our core work, our core services and the way we organize, is based on that particular oppression of being born as female. That's why our services are for only for women who are born as female."

== Kimberly Nixon v. Vancouver Rape Relief Society ==
In August 1995 Kimberly Nixon, a trans woman, filed a complaint against the shelter with the British Columbia Human Rights Tribunal after being turned down for a place on its training programme for volunteer counselors. Nixon argued that this constituted illegal discrimination under Section 41 of the British Columbia Human Rights Code. Vancouver Rape Relief countered that individuals are shaped by the socialization and experiences of their formative years, and that, having grown up "experiencing men's privileges", Nixon would not be able to provide effective counseling. The tribunal found in Nixon's favour and issued an award of $7,500.

Vancouver Rape Relief appealed this decision to the Supreme Court of British Columbia. In 2005 the court repealed the tribunal's verdict, ruling that the shelter is a group protected by section 41 of the B.C. Human Rights Code, which offers an exemption to certain types of organization. (Note: British Columbia Human Rights Code: "If a charitable, philanthropic, educational, fraternal, religious or social organization or corporation that is not operated for profit has as a primary purpose the promotion of the interests and welfare of an identifiable group or class of persons characterized by a physical or mental disability or by a common race, religion, age, sex, sexual orientation, gender identity or expression, marital status, political belief, colour, ancestry or place of origin, that organization or corporation must not be considered to be contravening this Code because it is granting a preference to members of the identifiable group or class of persons.") Nixon appealed that decision to the Supreme Court of Canada, which declined to hear the appeal in February 2007. Vancouver Rape Relief's lawyer, Christine Boyle, applauded the decision, saying that the "right to organize has been confirmed and is under protection of the law". Nixon's attorney, barbara findlay, (Note: findlay spells her name without capitals.) said she was disappointed with the ruling, but optimistic about the long-term: "Ultimately, what is accessible to all women will be accessible to trans women, too... I think this just shows that achieving equality will take a long time for the transgendered. But there will be other cases."

== See also ==
- Radical feminism
- Abolition of Prostitution
- Women-only space
