= Mario Martino =

Trans male author

- Born: 1937; Gary, Indiana
- Died: 2011 (aged 73–74)
- Other name: Angelo Tornabene
- Occupations: (previously) Nun; Nurse, author and trans rights activist
- Known for: Early trans male autobiographer

Mario Martino (also known as Angelo "Tony" Tornabene) was a former nun and transgender male author. He is known for writing one of the first autobiographies on the trans male experience. He also founded and directed the Labyrinth Foundation Counselling and Gender Services in Yonkers, New York.

== Work prior to gender transition ==
Martino was born in Gary, Indiana in 1937.

As a nun, he was removed from his convent when it became clear that he had sexual feelings for women. In his autobiography, Martino explicitly connects his sexual orientation to his gender identity, saying "I was a boy. I felt like one, I dressed like one, I fought like one. Later I was to love like one."

While working as a laboratory technician prior to his gender transition, Martino and other technicians took a 17-ketosteroid urine test, where it was found that he had "the 17-ketosteroids of a 17-year-old male". While working in the laboratory he met his wife, a registered nurse named "Rebecca" (Dorcas Tornabene).

== Autobiography ==
Emergence: A Transsexual Autobiography was published by Crown Publishers in 1977. The book discussed his gender dysphoria, a lack of attachment to traditional feminine pursuits, his sexual attraction towards women and not men, and difficulty coming to terms with his gender identity as a child, and how these contradicted with his Italian-Catholic upbringing.

Martino's autobiography was notable for including explicit mentions of sexual activity, which are often absent from transgender autobiographical accounts.

Martino was a guest on several talk shows to promote his book.

== Gender transition and aftermath ==
Martino's gender transition consisted of a double mastectomy, a hysterectomy, phalloplasty and hormonal treatment. While transitioning, he nearly died after three surgeries proved unsuccessful. However, following surgery, he was able to obtain a new drivers' license, an amended birth certificate and college certificate under his preferred name.

Despite this, Martino faced discrimination by employers and school admissions officials, having been fired from his job in a nursing home when officials were told of his gender identity. One landlord kicked Martino out of his house, and he "lost out on several good jobs because of" his trans identity. "I still cannot get a teaching position in a college because of it", Martino said in 1980.

He founded the Labyrinth Foundation, a facility in Yonkers, New York for counseling those with gender dysphoria. He and his wife gave marriage and psychological counselling to trans people.
