= Dallas Denny =

American writer and transgender rights activist

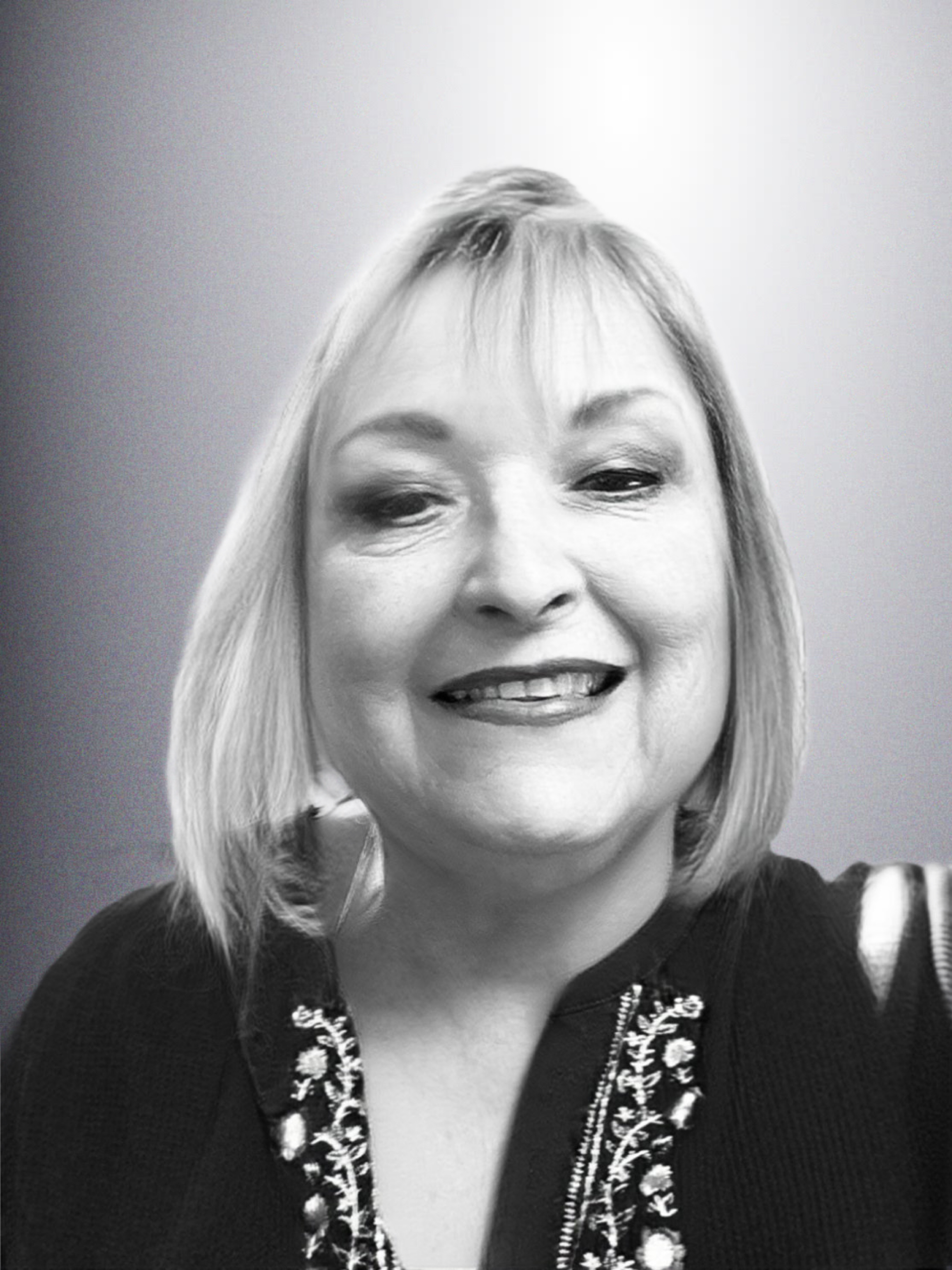
- Dallas Denny, December, 2021
- Born: August 18, 1949 (age 77); Asheville, North Carolina, U.S.
- Education: Middle Tennessee State (B.S.), University of Tennessee (M.A.)
- Occupation: Applied behavior analyst (Retired)
- Known for: Writing, education, policy development, and activism on behalf of transgender and transsexual people

Dallas Denny (born August 18, 1949, in Asheville, North Carolina) is a writer, editor, behavior analyst, and transgender rights activist.

== Education ==
Denny holds the M.A. degree in psychology from The University of Tennessee and the B.S. degree in psychology and sociology from Middle Tennessee State University. She was licensed to practice psychology in Tennessee from 1980 through the mid-1990s.

== Activism ==
In 1990 Denny founded the 501(c)(3) nonprofit American Educational Gender Information Service (now Gender Education & Advocacy, Inc.). In the same year she started the Atlanta Gender Explorations Support Group and launched the print journal Chrysalis Quarterly. In 1993 she founded the National Transgender Library & Archive, which now resides in the Labadie Collection at The University of Michigan Library System. Also in the 1990s she continued the work of the Erickson Educational Foundation. She was a founder of Atlanta's transgender Southern Comfort Conference and provided start up funding, through AEGIS, for the first FTM Conference of the Americas. She was Director of the transgender conference Fantasia Fair for five years and from 1999 to 2008 editor of Transgender Tapestry Journal, published by the International Foundation for Gender Education.

== Writing ==
Since 1989 Denny has produced dozens of flyers, booklets, and medical advisories, contributed considerable content to Chrysalis, AEGIS' several newsletters, and Transgender Tapestry, and written a column for TG Forum. She wrote hundreds of articles for transgender community magazines and newsletters, many of which were widely reprinted and eventually placed on the internet. In 1994 her book Gender Dysphoria: A Guide to Research was the first book-length contribution to the scientific literature of transsexualism produced by a transsexual. Her 1998 Current Concepts in Transgender Identity reprised John Money & Richard Green's text Transsexualism and Sex Reassignment. Today Denny publishes an online version of Chrysalis Quarterly. Her novel Chance down the Mountain was published in 2018 by Foundations, LLC.

== Awards ==
Denny has received IFGE's Trinity and Virginia Prince Lifetime Achievement Award and Real Life Experience's Transgender Pioneer Award.

== Personal ==
Denny was born in Asheville, North Carolina to Ruby Lee Bradley and an unidentified father. When Dallas was about three, Richard Denny married Ruby Lee and Denny was adopted. Denny has resided in North Carolina, France, Arizona, Georgia, and Tennessee, and since 2015 has lived in the highlands of New Jersey. Marriages: Lynneda Jane Roberts Denny (1971–1976) and Heather Kay Verdui (2015-). She has three siblings, all living. She has no children.
