= Victoria Conference Centre =

Conference centre in Victoria, British Columbia, Canada

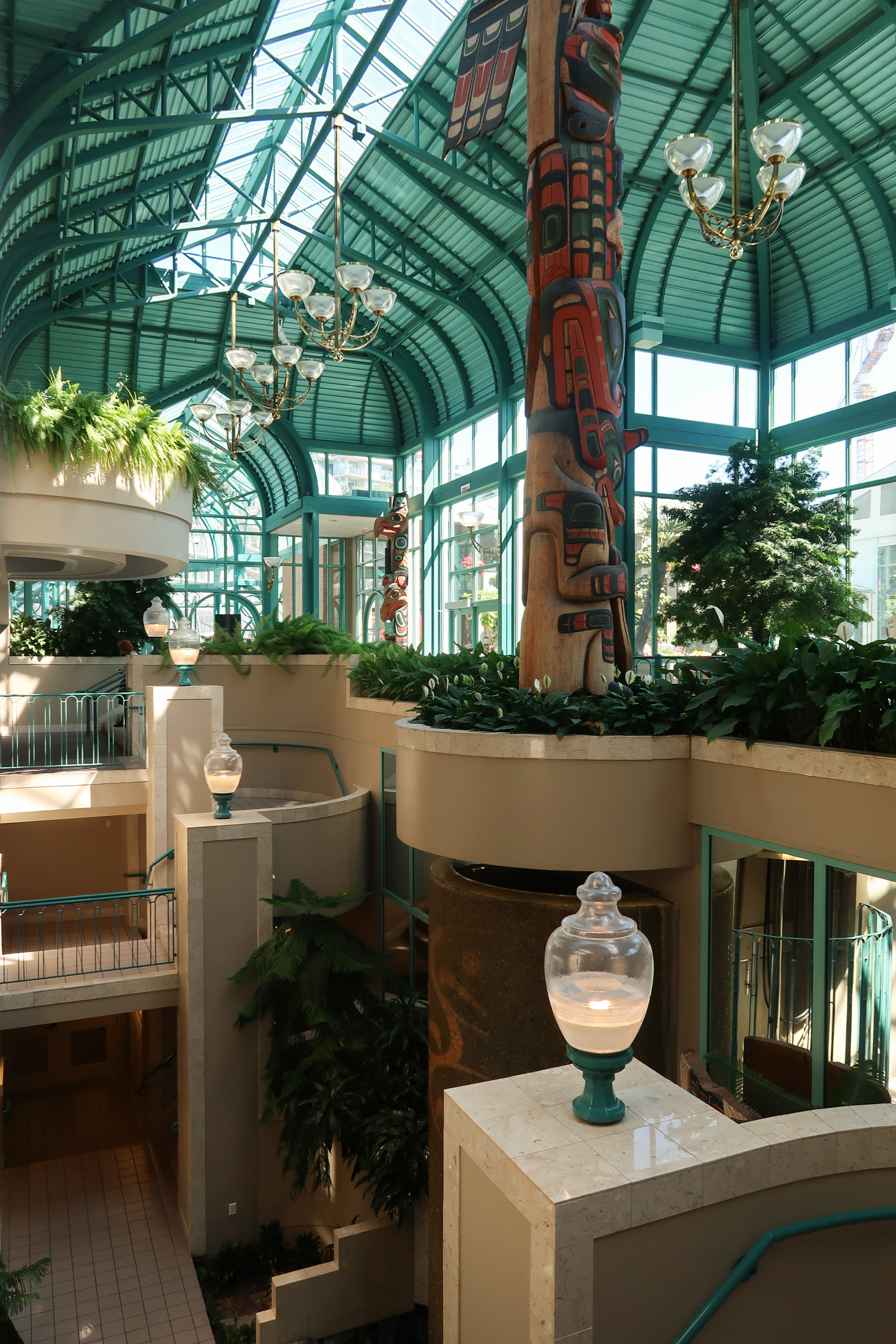
- The centre's lobby (2018)
- Interactive map of the Victoria Conference Centre area

General information
- Location: 720 Douglas Street; Victoria, British Columbia; V8W 3M7
- Coordinates: 48.421394°N 123.366539°W
- Opened: 1989
- Owner: City of Victoria

Technical details
- Floor area: 73,000 square feet (6,800 m^{2})

Website
- www.tourismvictoria.com/meetings/victoria-conference-centre

The Victoria Conference Centre is a conference centre located in the downtown core of Victoria, British Columbia, Canada. In January 2008, the centre received a CA$2 million upgrade through the Canada-B.C. Municipal Rural Infrastructure Fund, making it the second largest conference centre in British Columbia.
