= Transgender history in the United States =

The Transgender Pride Flag, created by American transgender woman Monica Helms in 1999, and first shown at a pride parade in Phoenix, Arizona, United States, in 2000

Historical accounts of transgender people in the land now known as the United States of America date back to at least the early 1600s. Before Western contact, some Native American tribes had third gender people whose social roles varied from tribe to tribe. People dressing and living differently from the gender roles typical of their sex assigned at birth and contributing to various aspects of American history and culture have been documented from the 17th century to the present day. In the 20th and 21st centuries, advances in gender-affirming surgery as well as transgender activism have influenced transgender life and the popular perception of transgender people in the United States.

== Overview ==
=== Prior to 1800 ===
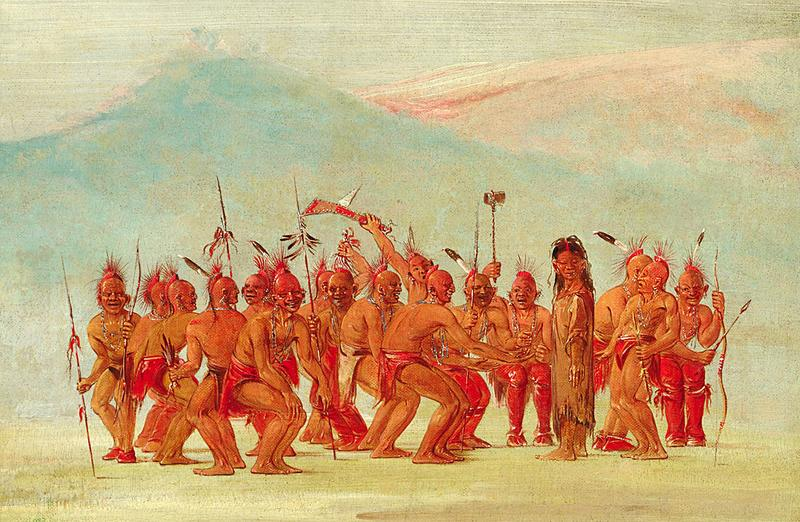
Anthropologist George Catlin's painting, "Dance to the Berdache" [sic]. Circa 1861–1869, among the Sac and Fox Nations. Catlin's writings about gay and gender-variant Indigenous peoples were not flattering.

Some Native American Nations have longstanding names and roles for gender-variant or third-gender people. The term two-spirit, which is now retroactively used to describe these historical roles, was only created in 1990 at the Indigenous lesbian and gay international gathering in Winnipeg, and "specifically chosen to distinguish and distance Native American/First Nations people from non-Native peoples". The primary purpose of coining a new term was to encourage the replacement of the outdated and considered offensive, anthropological term, berdache, which appears in anthropological accounts. While this new term has not been universally accepted—it has been criticized by traditional communities who already have their own terms for the people being grouped under this new term, and by those who reject what they call the "western" binary implications, such as implying that Natives believe these individuals are "both male and female"—it has generally received more acceptance and use than the anthropological term it replaced.

One of the first documented inhabitants of the American colonies to challenge binary gender roles was Thomas(ine) Hall, a servant who, in the 1620s, alternately dressed in both men's and women's clothing. Hall is likely to have been intersex, and was ordered by the Virginia court to wear both a man's breeches and a woman's apron and cap at the same time.

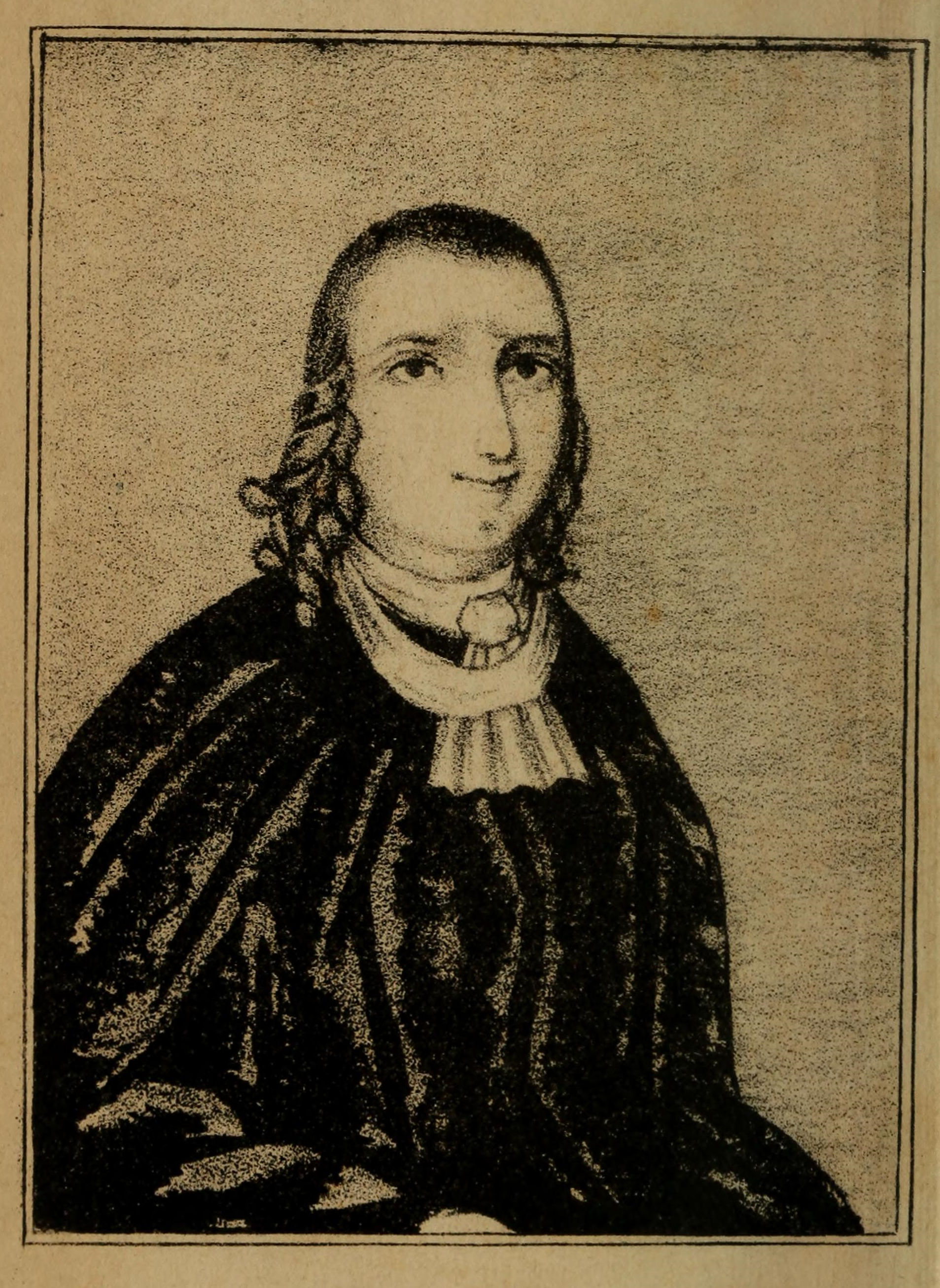
Portrait of the Public Universal Friend from 1821

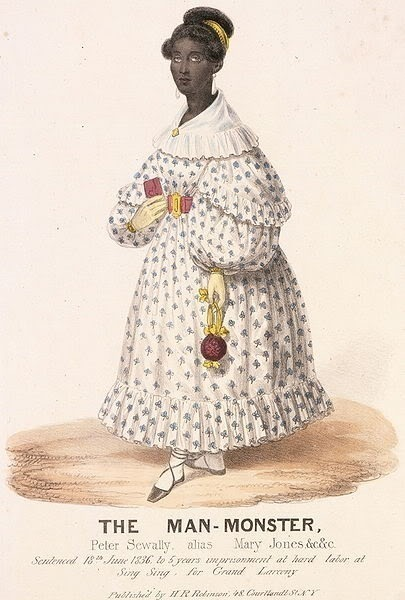
Lithogram of Mary Jones drawn by H. R. Robinson in 1836

In 1776, the preacher Public Universal Friend reported experiencing death and returning to life as a genderless being (neither male nor female). After the Friend's purported resurrection, the Friend no longer answered to former birth name and gendered pronouns, dressing androgynously and asking followers they gained while preaching throughout New England over the next four decades to avoid birth name and gendered pronouns. Some scholars have viewed them as outside the gender binary, and as a chapter in trans history "before [the word] 'transgender'".

Generally, according to Genny Beemyn in a Transgender History of the United States, the few historical accounts of transgender people that exist in 17th and 18th century America predominantly feature female to male transgender people, possibly because it was more difficult for male to female people to successfully present as women before the advent of hormone treatments and gender-affirming surgery. One example she cites is Mary Henly, a female-assigned individual in Massachusetts who was charged with illegally wearing men's clothing in 1692 because it was "seeming to confound the course of nature".

=== 1800–1950 ===
Joseph Lobdell (born in 1829 as Lucy Ann Lobdell) lived as a man for sixty years. Due to this he was arrested and incarcerated in an insane asylum. He was, however, able to marry a woman.

Stagecoach driver Charley Parkhurst (born in 1812) ran away from a Lebanon, New Hampshire orphanage at age 12 and lived as a man for the rest of his life. He was a celebrated carriage driver, spending some of his career serving frontier California during the Gold Rush. For at least 15 years he worked as a chicken farmer and lumberjack, and he managed to retire in Watsonville, California. He died from tongue cancer in 1879 while living alone in a cabin. He did not marry, and he was only outed by neighbors after his death.

Mary Jones (born in 1803 as Peter Sewally), a free African-American, was arrested in New York City in 1836 for dressing as a woman, prostitution, and pickpocketing. According to a contemporary report in the New York World, Jones appeared in court "attired a la mode de New York, elegantly, and in perfect style. Her dingy ears were decked with a pair of snow white earrings, her head was ornamented with a wig of beautiful curly locks, and on it was a gilded comb, which was half hid amid the luxuriant crop of wool." When asked about the dress, Jones replied, "I have been in the practice of waiting upon Girls of ill fame ... and they induced me to dress in Women's Clothes, saying I looked so much better in them and I have always attended parties among the people of my own Colour dressed in this way – and in New Orleans I always dressed in this way." Jones was sentenced to five years in prison for grand larceny. A lithograph titled "The Man-Monster", showing Jones in female clothing, was published shortly afterwards. Jones was arrested twice more in 1845, both times dressed as a woman.

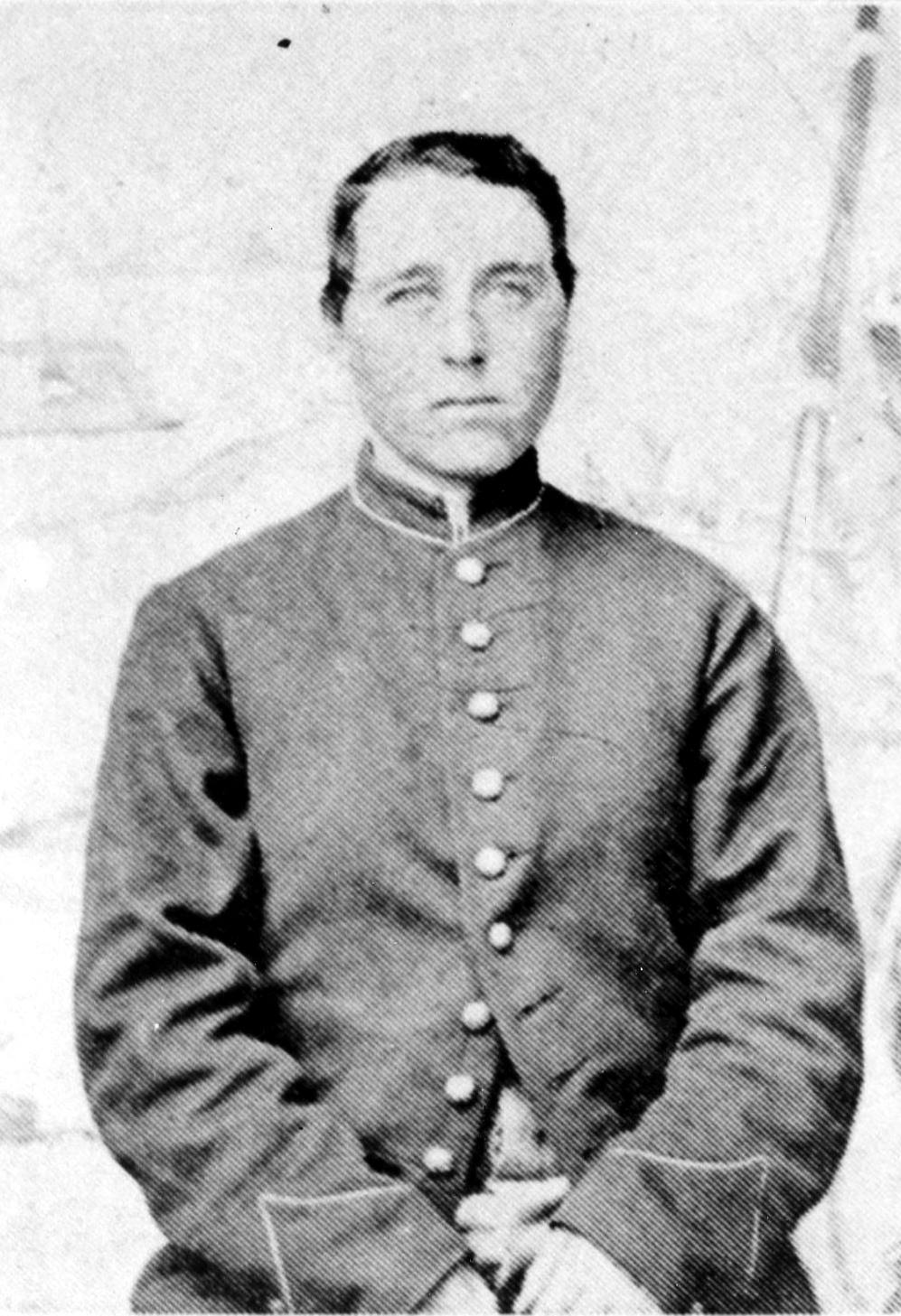
Albert Cashier in 1864

During the American Civil War (1861–1865) at least 240 people who were assigned female at birth are known to have worn men's clothing and fought as soldiers. Many may have done so because they were not allowed to fight as women and this was their means of participating in the war effort. Some were transgender and continued to live as men throughout their lives. One such notable soldier was Albert Cashier, who lived as a man for over 53 years. After the war, Frances Thompson (a formerly enslaved black trans woman) was one of five black women who testified before Congress's investigation of the Memphis riots of 1866, during which a mob of white terrorists attacked and raped Thompson; ten years later, Thompson was arrested for "being a man dressed in women's clothing".

Transgender studies in Europe, especially Germany, began to percolate back to the United States in the late 1800s. Writer Edward Charles Spitzka reminded American readers of Edward Hyde, 3rd Earl of Clarendon, governor of colonial New York remembered for cross-dressing.

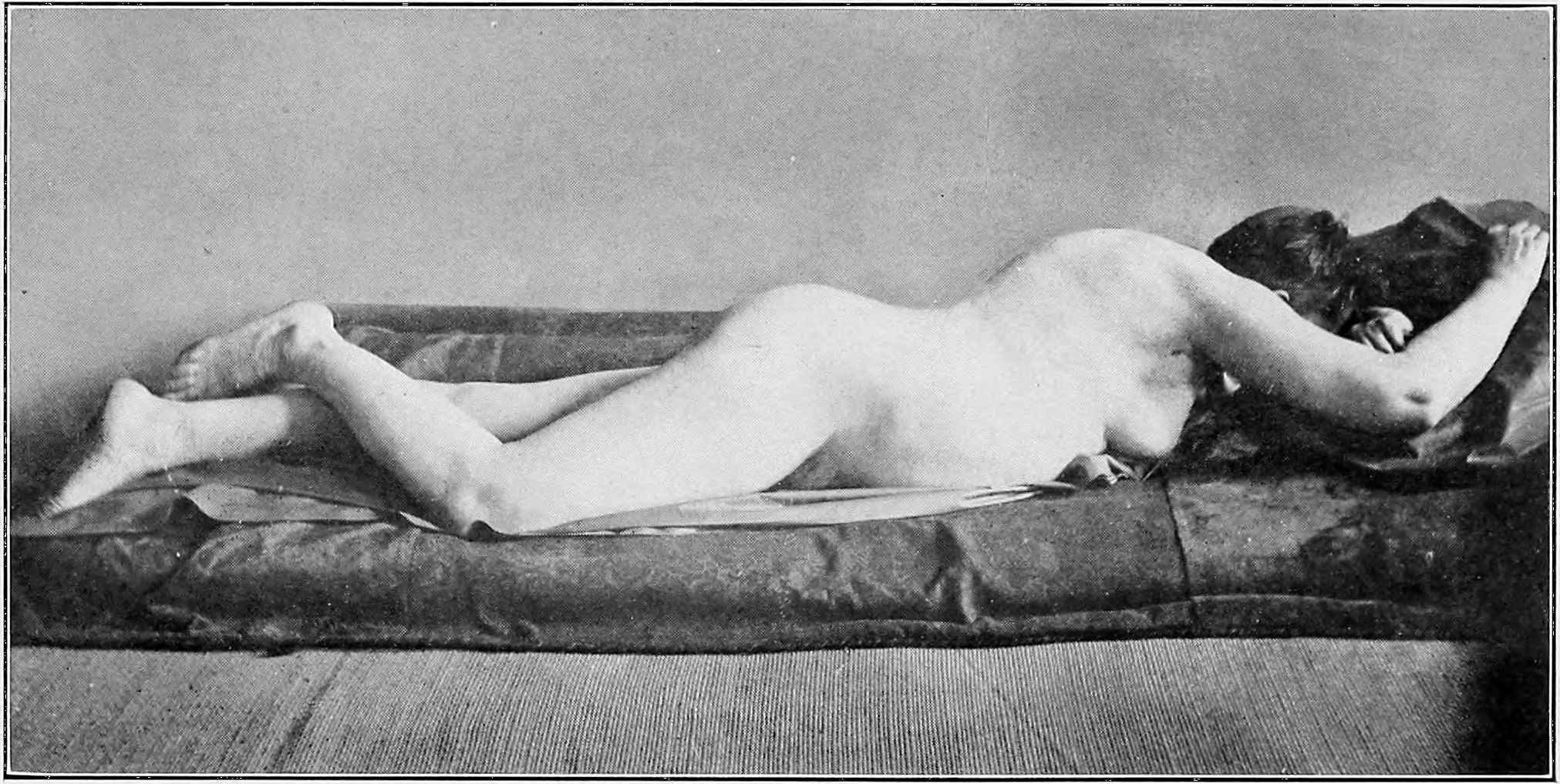
Jennie June posing in imitation of the Sleeping Hermaphroditus statue, published 1918.

In 1895 a group of self-described androgynes in New York organized a club called the Cercle Hermaphroditos, based on their wish "to unite for defense against the world's bitter persecution". Jennie June (born in 1874, birth name unknown, also wrote under the pseudonyms Earl Lind and Ralph Werther), a member of the Cercle Hermaphroditos, wrote memoirs: The Autobiography of an Androgyne (1918) and The Female Impersonators (1922). June described himself with contemporary terms for gender and sexual variance as an invert, urning, fairie, androgyne, and "instinctive female impersonator". June was assigned male at birth and referred to himself with he/him pronouns throughout his memoirs, but said he had desired all his life to become a woman, and chose to have an orchiectomy (removal of the testicles) in order to help feminize his body. His stated purpose in publishing these very personal stories was to help increase acceptance of inverts, and reduce the suicide of young inverts. In 2010 five sections of her third volume of memoirs (dated 1921 but never published), previously lost, were discovered and published on OutHistory.org.

Murray Hall (1841–1901) was a politician in New York City for almost twenty-five years. After Hall's death, it was discovered that he had been assigned female at birth. Hall had been married twice and had an adopted daughter. Although his most recent wife had predeceased him, his daughter was described as "terribly shocked. She said she always believed her foster father was a man, and never heard her foster mother say anything that would lead her to suspect otherwise."

Some cases are known of immigrants changing their gender identity upon arrival in the United States, especially trans men. One notable case is that of Frank Woodhull, who lived for around 15 years as a man and was discovered to have been "posing as a man" during processing at Ellis Island in 1908.

In 1917, Dr. Alan L. Hart, working with psychiatrist Dr. Joshua Gilbert, was the first documented trans man in the United States to undergo hysterectomy and gonadectomy, in order to live his life as a man. Following his transition, Hart told The Albany Daily Democrat that he was "happier since I made this change than I ever have been in my life, and I will continue this way as long as I live ... I have never concealed anything regarding my [change] to men's clothing ... I came home to show my friends that I am ashamed of nothing."

Trans woman Lucy Hicks Anderson was born in 1886 in Waddy, Kentucky. She served as a domestic worker in her teen years, eventually becoming a socialite and madame in Oxnard, California during the 1920s and 1930s. In 1945, she was tried in Ventura County for perjury and fraud for receiving spousal allotments from the military, as her dressing and presenting as a woman was considered masquerading. She lost the case, but avoided a lengthy jail sentence, only to be tried again by the federal government shortly thereafter. She also lost this case, and was sentenced to jail time, along with her then husband Ruben Anderson. After serving their sentences, they relocated to Los Angeles, where they lived quietly until her death in 1954.

In 1933, Hannah Nokes, a Black trans woman born in 1898, made headlines when she testified in a court in Loudoun County, Virginia. Nokes was a witness for the prosecution at the historic trial of George Crawford, who was defended by an all-Black team including noted civil rights attorney Charles Hamilton Houston.

Billy Tipton was a notable American jazz musician and bandleader who lived as a man in all aspects of his life from the 1940s until his death. His own son did not know of his past until Tipton's death. The first newspaper article about Tipton was published the day after his funeral and was quickly picked up by wire services. Stories about Tipton appeared in a variety of papers including tabloids such as the National Enquirer and Star, as well as more reputable papers such as New York Magazine and The Seattle Times. Tipton's family also made talk show appearances.

=== 1950s and 1960s ===
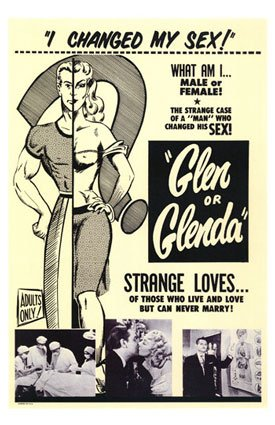
The 1953 film Glen or Glenda dealt with transsexuality and transvestism.

The 1950s and 1960s saw some of the first transgender organizations and publications, but law and medicine did not respond favorably to growing awareness of transgender people.

The most famous American transgender person of the time was Christine Jorgensen, who in 1952 became the first widely publicized person to have undergone gender-affirming surgery (in this case, male to female), creating a worldwide sensation. She was denied a marriage license in 1959 when she attempted to marry a man. Her fiancé lost his job when his engagement to Christine became public knowledge.

Virginia Prince, a transgender person who began living full time as a woman in San Francisco in the 1940s, developed a widespread correspondence network with transgender people throughout Europe and the United States by the 1950s. She worked closely with Alfred Kinsey to bring the needs of transgender people to the attention of social scientists and sex reformers.

In 1952, using Virginia Prince's correspondence network for its initial subscription list, a handful of other transgender people in Southern California launched Transvestia: The Journal of the American Society for Equality in Dress, which published two issues. The Society that launched the journal also only briefly existed in Southern California.

In May 1959, the Cooper Donuts Riot was an incident in Los Angeles, in which transgender women, lesbian women, drag queens, and gay men rioted, one of the first LGBT uprisings in the US. The incident was sparked by police harassment of LGBT people at a 24-hour café called Cooper Donuts.

In 1960, Virginia Prince began another publication, also called Transvestia, that discussed transgender concerns. In 1962, she founded the Hose and Heels Club for cross-dressers, which soon changed its name to Phi Pi Epsilon, a name designed to evoke Greek-letter sororities and to play on the initials FPE, the acronym for Prince's philosophy of "Full Personality Expression". Prince believed that the binary gender system harmed both men and women by keeping them from their full human potential, and she considered cross-dressing to be one means of fixing this.

Reed Erickson, a transsexual man, founded the Erickson Educational Foundation in 1964. EEF supplied information at no cost to transgender people, family members, and professionals and provided funding for the publication of Richard Green and John Money's edited 1969 text Transsexualism and Sex Reassignment and other books about sex and gender. EEF also funded the earliest symposia for professionals who worked with transsexuals; this eventually resulted in the formation of the Harry Benjamin International Gender Dysphoria Association, which is today called the World Professional Association for Transgender Health. The work of the EEF would be continued by psychologist Paul Walker in the late 1970s, in the 1980s by Sister Mary Elizabeth Clark and Jude Patton, and in the 1990s by Dallas Denny.

In the late 1960s in New York, Mario Martino founded the Labyrinth Foundation Counseling Service, which was the first transgender community-based organization that specifically addressed the needs of transsexual men.

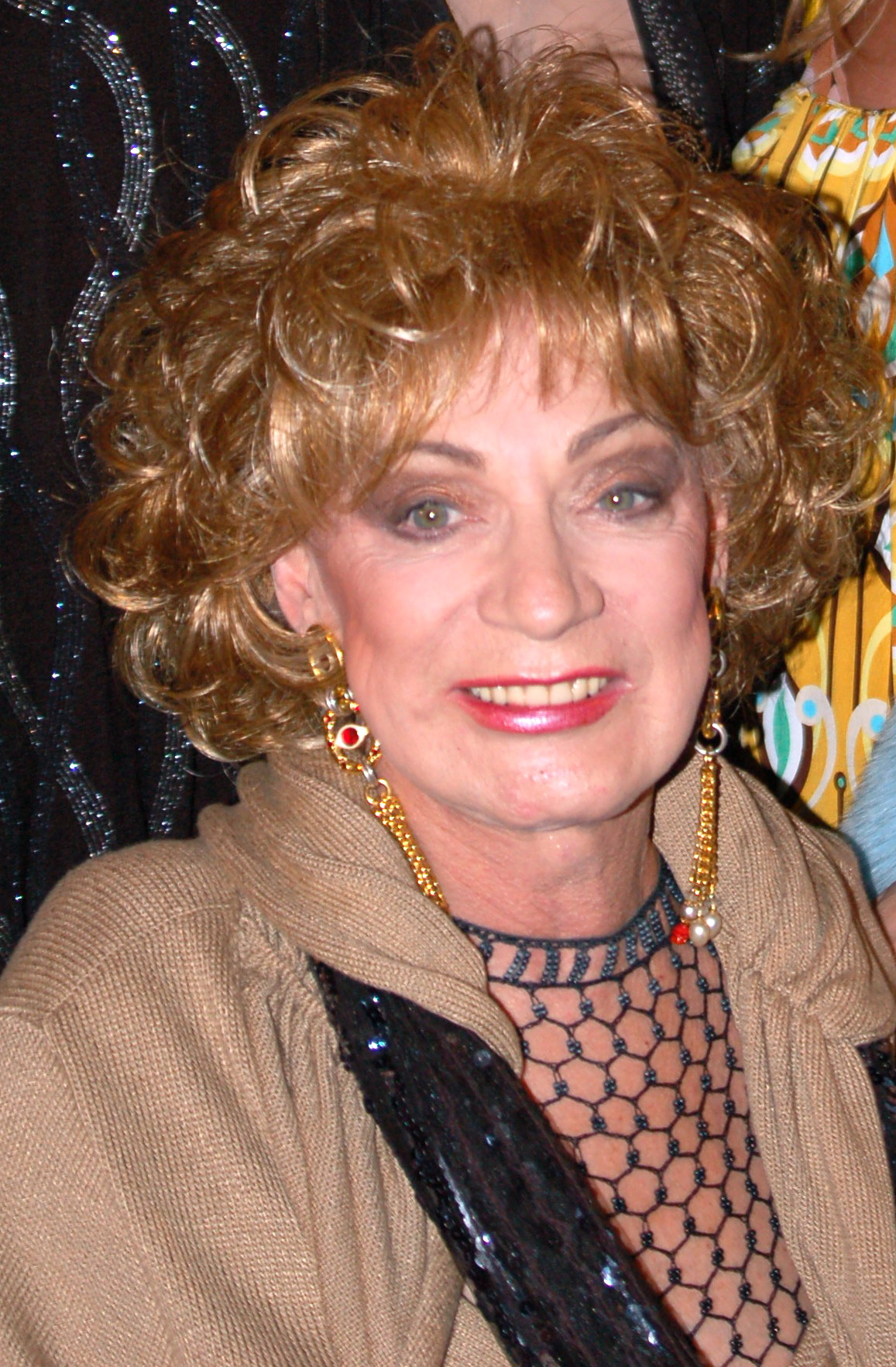
Holly Woodlawn, Andy Warhol superstar, in 2007

Transgender people also gained some exposure through popular culture, in particular the work of Andy Warhol. In the 1960s and early 1970s the transgender actresses Holly Woodlawn and Candy Darling were among Warhol's Warhol Superstars, appearing in several of his films. In 1968, Gore Vidal published the first American novel in which the lead character undergoes gender-affirming surgery, Myra Breckinridge, which was later made into a film.

On April 25, 1965, over 150 people were denied service at Dewey's, a local coffee shop and diner at 219 South 17th Street in Philadelphia, near Rittenhouse Square. Those denied service were variously described at the time as "homosexuals", "masculine women", "feminine men", and "persons wearing non-conformist clothing". Three teenagers, reported by the Janus Society and Drum magazine to be two males and one female, staged a sit-in that day. After restaurant managers contacted police, the three were arrested. In the process of offering legal support for the teens, local activist and president of the homophile organization the Janus Society, Clark Polak, was also arrested.

Demonstrations took place outside the establishment over the next five days, with 1,500 flyers being distributed by the Janus Society and its supporters. Three people staged a second sit-in on May 2, 1965. The police were again called, but refused to make arrests this time. The Janus Society said the protests were successful in preventing further arrests and the action was deemed "the first sit-in of its kind in the history of the United States" by Drum magazine.

In 1965, the word transgender was coined by psychiatrist John F. Oliven of Columbia University in his 1965 reference work Sexual Hygiene and Pathology.

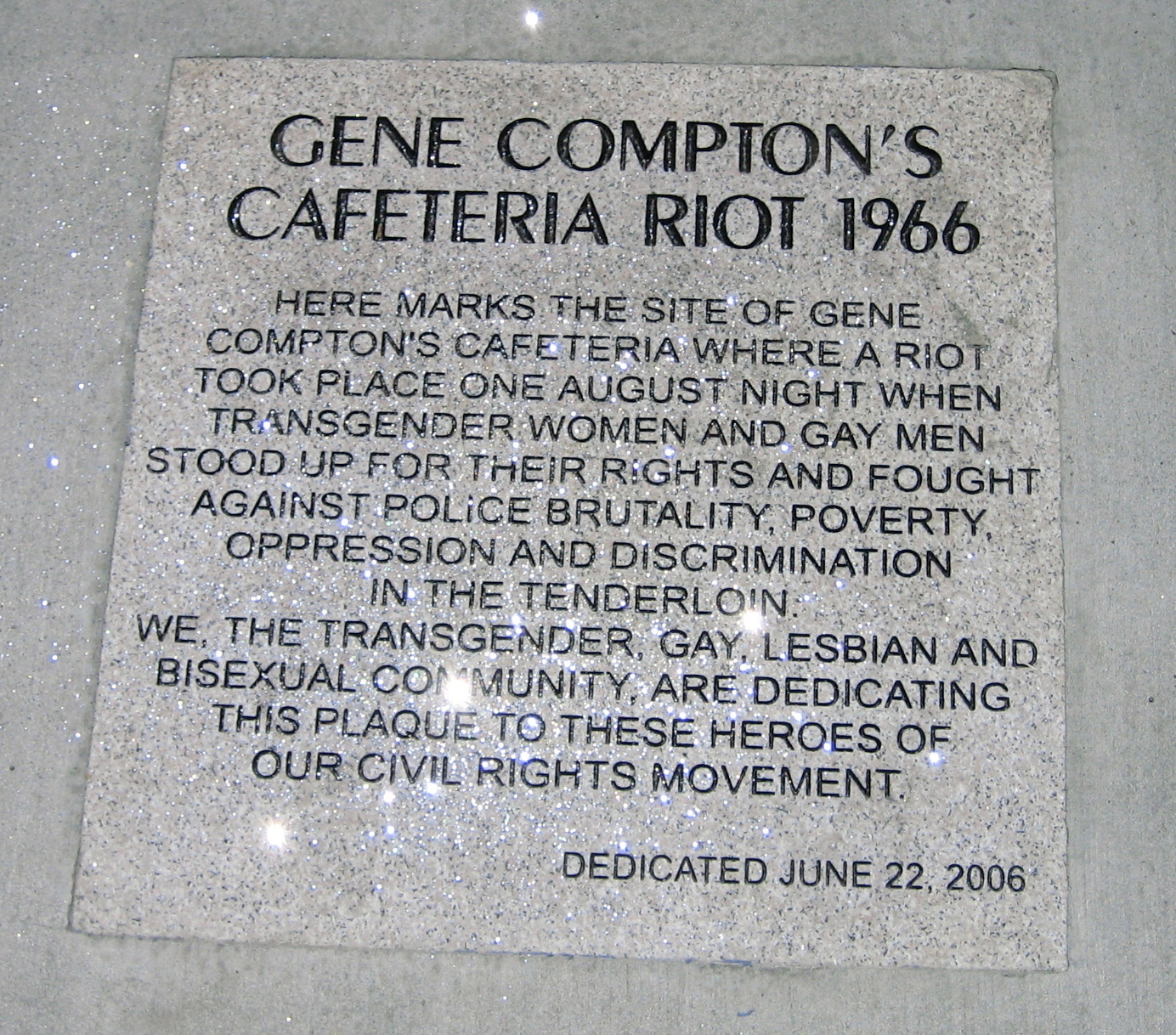
The Gene Compton's Cafeteria Riot 40th Anniversary Historical Marker at the corner of Taylor and Turk in San Francisco

In 1966, one of the first recorded transgender riots in US history took place. The Compton's Cafeteria Riot occurred in the Tenderloin district of San Francisco. The night after the riot, more transgender people, hustlers, Tenderloin street people, and other members of the LGBT community joined in a picket of the cafeteria, which would not allow transgender people back in. The demonstration ended with the newly installed plate-glass windows being smashed again. The riot marked the beginning of transgender activism in San Francisco. According to the online encyclopedia glbtq.com, "In the aftermath of the riot at Compton's, a network of transgender social, psychological, and medical support services was established, which culminated in 1968 with the creation of the National Transsexual Counseling Unit [NTCU], the first such peer-run support and advocacy organization in the world".

Some people who later went on to be involved in transgender activism were involved in the Stonewall riots of 1969 at the Stonewall Inn in New York. This week-long violent uprising in the gay bars and streets of Greenwich Village is widely considered to be a turning point in for the LGBT rights movement in America, as it marked the transition from the more assimilationist, respectability politics of groups like the Mattachine Society and Daughters of Bilitis to the birth of the radical gay liberation movement and the founding of groups like the Gay Liberation Front, with its Drag Queen Caucus, members of whom later founded Street Transvestite Action Revolutionaries and the Queens Liberation Front. Gender-nonconforming and trans activists including Marsha P. Johnson, Zazu Nova, and Jackie Hormona were confirmed to be "in the vanguard" of the rioting on the first night.

=== 1970s and 1980s ===
Many support organizations for male cross-dressers began in the 1970s and 1980s, with most beginning as offshoots of Virginia Prince's organizations from the early 1960s. Transgender activist Lee Brewster, of the Queens Liberation Front began publishing the transgender women's magazine Queens. Angela Douglas founded TAO (Transsexual/Transvestite Action Organization), which published the Moonshadow and Mirage newsletters. TAO moved to Miami in 1972, where it came to include several Puerto Rican and Cuban members, and soon grew into the first international transgender community organization.

In 1975, the Cherrystones, a transgender support group in Boston, founded Fantasia Fair as a week-long conference in Provincetown, MA, for gender-questioning people. Renamed TransWeek in 2023, the annual event is the longest-running transgender event in the world.

Another significant event for activism occurred in 1979, with the first National March on Washington for Lesbian and Gay Rights held in Washington, D.C., on October 14. It drew between 75,000 and 125,000 transgender people, lesbians, bisexual people, gay men, and straight allies to demand equal civil rights and urge the passage of protective civil rights legislation. The march was organized by Phyllis Frye (who in 2010 became Texas's first openly transgender judge) and three other activists, but no transgender people spoke at the main rally.

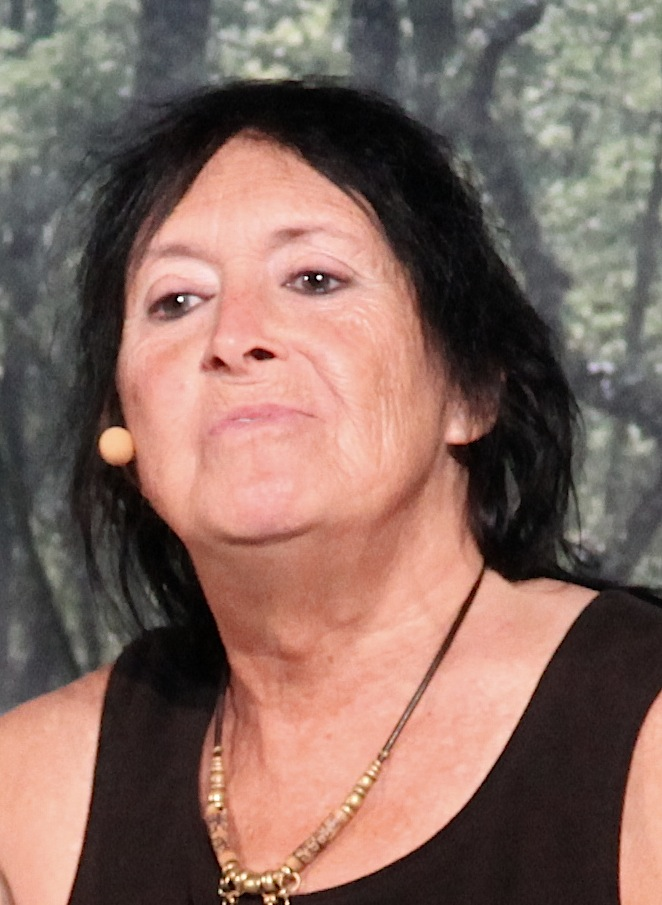
Sandy Stone, as transgender engineer of Olivia Records, was targeted in the 1970s; she has been cited as the originator of transgender studies.

The 1970s also saw conflict between the transgender and lesbian communities in America. A dispute began in 1973, when the West Coast Lesbian Conference split over a scheduled performance by the lesbian transgender folk singer Beth Elliott. Elliott had served as vice-president of the San Francisco chapter of the lesbian group Daughters of Bilitis, and edited the chapter's newsletter, Sisters, but was expelled from the group in 1973 on the grounds that she was not really a woman. In 1977 some lesbians protested the fact that lesbian transgender woman Sandy Stone was employed at Olivia Records.

In 1979, lesbian trans-exclusionary radical feminist activist Janice Raymond released the book The Transsexual Empire: The Making of the She-Male, which she framed as a critique of a patriarchal medical and psychiatric establishment, and which maintains that transsexualism is based on the "patriarchal myths" of "male mothering", and "making of woman according to man's image". Raymond claimed this was done in order "to colonize feminist identification, culture, politics and sexuality", adding: "All transsexuals rape women's bodies by reducing the real female form to an artifact, appropriating this body for themselves ... Transsexuals merely cut off the most obvious means of invading women, so that they seem non-invasive." In this charge, Raymond echoed feminist Robin Morgan's charge at the 1973 West Coast Lesbian Conference, held in Los Angeles, that pre-op transsexual folk singer Beth Elliott, who had performed the previous day, was "an opportunist, an infiltrator, and a destroyer-with the mentality of a rapist".

In particular, Raymond mounted an ad hominem attack on Sandy Stone in The Transsexual Empire. Raymond accused Stone by name of plotting to destroy the Olivia Records collective and womanhood in general with "male energy". In 1976, prior to publication, Raymond had sent a draft of the chapter attacking Stone to the Olivia collective "for comment", apparently in anticipation of outing Stone. Raymond appeared unaware that Stone had informed the collective of her transgender status before agreeing to join. The collective did return comments to Raymond, suggesting that her description of transgender people and of Stone's place in and effect on the collective was at odds with the reality of the collective's interaction with Stone.

Raymond still published the book in 1979. In 1987, in response, Stone published "The Empire Strikes Back: A Posttranssexual Manifesto", which has been cited as the origin of transgender studies.

The collective themselves responded by publicly defending Stone in various feminist publications of the time. Stone continued as a member of the collective and continued to record Olivia artists until political dissension over her transgender status, exacerbated by Janice's book, culminated in 1979 in the threat of a boycott of Olivia products. After long debate, Stone left the collective and returned to Santa Cruz.

By the late 1970s, despite increasing recognition in medical circles, the battle for acceptance was far from won and some of the reverses of this period included the dissolution of some of the first transsexual advocacy groups including the NTCU, and the loss of support in both gay and feminist circles.

In 1980, transgender people were officially classified by the American Psychiatric Association as having "gender identity disorder".

The 1980s saw the founding of a number of newsletters and magazines of central importance to trans people. In the 1980s, most of the subscribers to Rupert Raj's Toronto-based publications, Metamorphosis and Gender NetWorker, were Americans. Metamorphosis was founded by Raj in early 1982 as a bi-monthly newsletter. It was a "newsletter exclusively for F–M men" (with an intended readership among their families, wives/girlfriends, as well as professionals and "para professionals interested in female TSism"). By the third issue, the newsletter averaged around 8 pages, whereas in 1986, most issues were 24 pages; the last issue was in 1988. In 1986 transgender activist Lou Sullivan founded the support group that grew into FTM International, the leading advocacy group for transgender men, and began publishing The FTM Newsletter. Gender NetWorker was founded by Raj in 1988, and lasted two issues. This publication was directed specifically towards "helping professionals and resource providers".

The term "transgender" as an umbrella term to refer to all gender non-conforming people became more commonplace in the late 1980s.

=== 1990s and 2000s ===
In 1991 a transgender woman named Nancy Burkholder was removed from the Michigan Womyn's Music Festival when security guards realized she was transgender. After that there were demonstrations against the Festival's women-born-women only policy. These demonstrations were known as Camp Trans. The final Michigan Womyn's Music Festival was held in 2015.

1991 was also the year of the first Southern Comfort Conference, a major transgender conference that takes place annually in Atlanta, Georgia. It is the largest, most famous, and pre-eminent such conference in the United States.

Several transgender organizations were founded in the 1990s and early 2000s. In 1991, Dallas Denny launched the 501(c)(3) nonprofit American Educational Gender Information Service, which provided information and referrals to trans people, their families, and the press, and published the respected journal Chrysalis Quarterly. Transgender Nation, an offshoot of Queer Nation's San Francisco chapter, was one of the early transgender organizations, lasting from 1992 to 1994. Transexual Menace (sic) was another such group, founded in 1994 by Riki Wilchins. One of its first actions was to hold a memorial vigil outside at the trial of Brandon Teena's killers. In 1995, all the national transgender organizations got together and formed the board of GenderPAC, the first national political advocacy organization devoted to the right to one's gender identity. GenderPAC organized the first National Gender Lobby Day on Capitol Hill the following year, with help from activists Phyllis Frye and Jane Fee. It also launched a Corporate Diversity Pledge of Fortune 500 companies that had added "gender identity" to their non-discrimination policies (since HRC's at that point was only "sexual orientation") as well as a similar Congressional Diversity Pledge. However, GenderPAC saw its focus as also including gender non-conforming gays and lesbians who were discriminated against, causing a split in the organization. In 1999 the National Transgender Advocacy Coalition was founded by a group of experienced transgender lobbyists. The Transgender Foundation of America was founded in 2001. In 2003 the National Center for Transgender Equality and the Transgender American Veterans Association (TAVA) were founded.

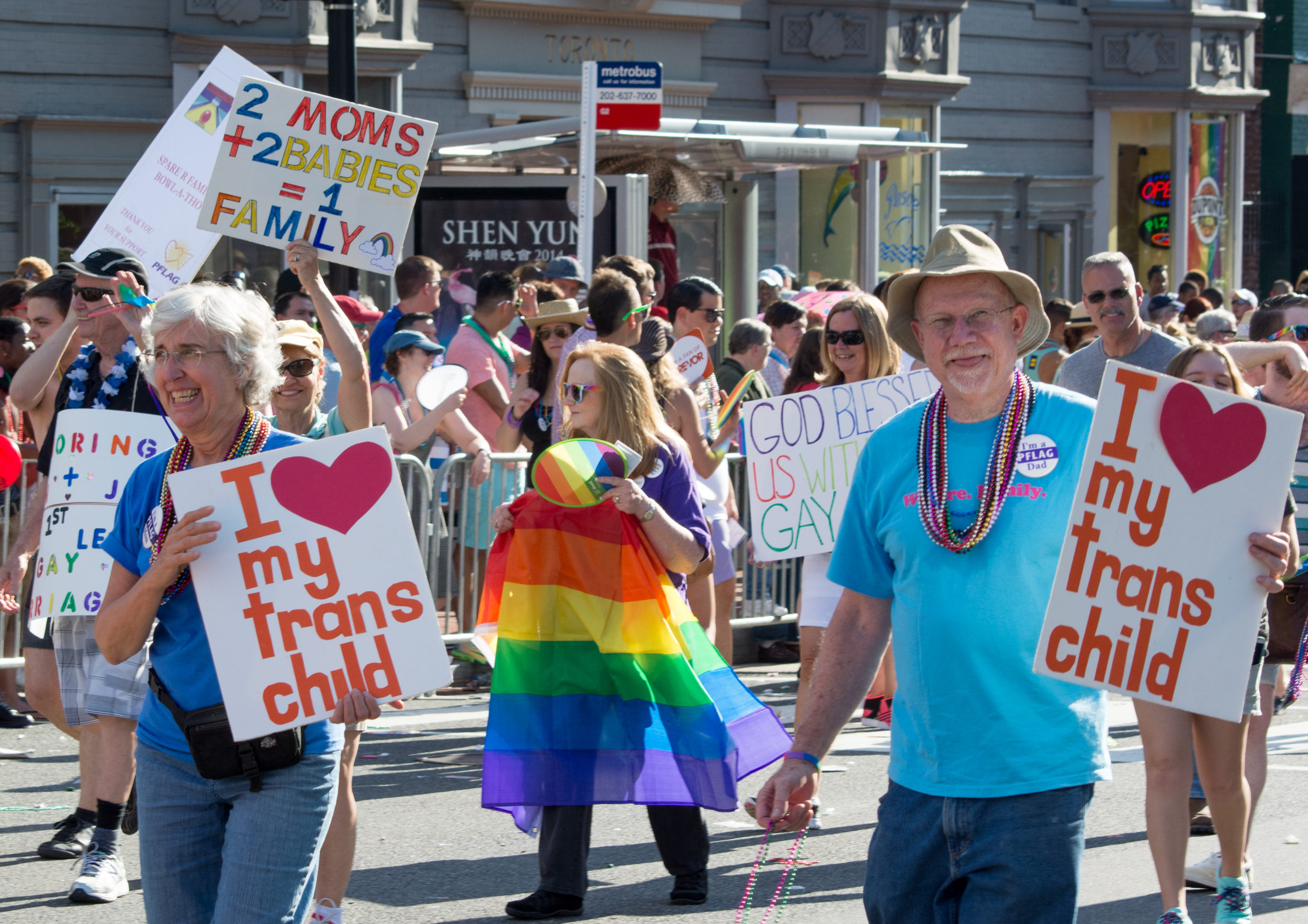
Parents of transgender children became active in the 2000s

The LGBT rights group Parents and Friends of Lesbians and Gays (PFLAG), founded in 1972, also became more supportive of transgender people at this time. In 1998 gender identity was added to their mission after a vote at their annual meeting in San Francisco. PFLAG was the first national LGBT organization to officially adopt a transgender inclusion policy for its work. PFLAG established its Transgender Network, also known as TNET, in 2002, as its first official "Special Affiliate", recognized with the same privileges and responsibilities as its regular chapters.

At this time the transgender community became more visible. A high school teacher in Lake Forest, Illinois, Karen Kopriva, became the first American teacher to transition on the job in 1998. There was considerable media uproar, but when another teacher followed the next year in a different suburb hardly anyone noticed. The Transgender Day of Remembrance was founded in 1998 by Gwendolyn Ann Smith, an American transgender graphic designer, columnist, and activist, to memorialize the murder of transgender woman Rita Hester in Massachusetts in 1998. The Transgender Day of Remembrance is held every year on November 20 and now memorializes all those murdered due to transphobic hate and prejudice. The most prominent version of the Transgender Pride flag was created in 1999 by the American trans woman Monica Helms. The flag was first shown at a pride parade in Phoenix, Arizona, in 2000. In 2012 Spokane Trans created their own version of the transgender pride flag. They describe it on their web site as follows: "The top two stripes represent male (blue) to female (pink). The purple represents non-binary and genderqueer people (as the genderqueer flag colors are green, white and purple) the thin white stripe represents all people as well as the "line" trans* folks cross during their transition. Then the female (pink) to male (blue) along the bottom." In 2009 the International Transgender Day of Visibility was founded by Rachel Crandall Crocker, also the founder of TransGender Michigan; it is an annual holiday occurring on March 31, dedicated to celebrating transgender people and raising awareness of discrimination faced by transgender people worldwide.

Transgender visibility in the LGBT community also gathered force in the 1990s and 2000s. In 1997, the Lambda Literary Awards added a new category for Transgender literature. In 2002, Pete Chvany, Luigi Ferrer, James Green, Loraine Hutchins and Monica McLemore presented at the Gay, Lesbian, Bisexual, Transgender, Queer and Intersex Health Summit, held in Boulder, Colorado, marking the first time transgender people, bisexual people, and intersex people were recognized as co-equal partners on the national level rather than gay and lesbian "allies" or tokens. In 2004 the San Francisco Trans March was first held. It has been held annually since; it is San Francisco's largest transgender Pride event and one of the largest trans events in the entire world. Also in 2004 the book The Man Who Would Be Queen: The Science of Gender-Bending and Transsexualism by the highly controversial researcher J. Michael Bailey was announced as a finalist in the Transgender category of the 2003 Lambda Literary Awards. Transgender people immediately protested the nomination and gathered thousands of petition signatures in opposition within a few days. After the petition, the Foundation's judges examined the book more closely, decided that they considered it transphobic and removed it from their list of finalists. Within a year the executive director who had initially approved of the book's inclusion resigned. Executive director Charles Flowers later stated that "the Bailey incident revealed flaws in our awards nomination process, which I have completely overhauled since becoming the foundation's executive director in January 2006". In 2005 transgender activist Pauline Park became the first openly transgender person chosen to be grand marshal of the New York City Pride March, the oldest and largest LGBT pride event in the United States.

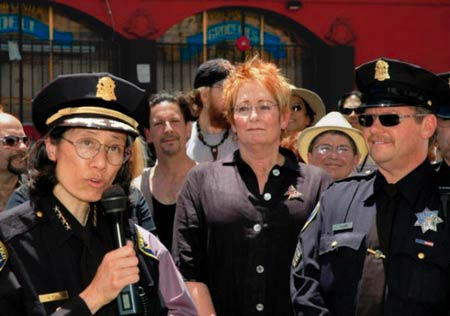
Police chief Heather Fong, Theresa Sparks, and Stephan Thorne, first transgender San Francisco police officer

Politics increasingly began to include openly transgender people. In 2003 Theresa Sparks was the first openly transgender woman ever named "Woman of the Year" by the California State Assembly, and in 2007 she was elected president of the San Francisco Police Commission by a single vote, making her the first openly transgender person ever to be elected president of any San Francisco commission, as well as San Francisco's highest ranking openly transgender official. In 2006 Kim Coco Iwamoto was elected as a member of the Hawaii Board of Education, making her at that time the highest ranking openly transgender elected official in the United States, as well as the first openly transgender official to win statewide office. In 2008 Stu Rasmussen became the first openly transgender mayor in America (in Silverton, Oregon). In 2009, Diego Sanchez became the first openly transgender person to work on Capitol Hill, where he worked as a legislative assistant for Barney Frank. Sanchez was also the first transgender person on the Democratic National Committee's (DNC) Platform Committee in 2008. In 2009, Barbra "Babs" Siperstein was nominated and confirmed as the first openly transgender at-large member of the Democratic National Committee, and in 2012 she became the first elected openly transgender member of the DNC.

Transgender history also began to be recognized around this time. In 1996 Leslie Feinberg published Transgender Warriors, a history of transgender people. Dallas Denny founded the Transgender Historical Society in 1995 and in 2000 donated her collection of historical materials to the Joseph A. Labadie Collection at the University of Michigan. In 2008 Cristan Williams donated her personal collection to the Transgender Foundation of America, where it became the first collection in the Transgender Archive, an archive of transgender history worldwide. In 2009 the Committee on Lesbian and Gay History, an affiliated society of the American Historical Association, changed its name to the Committee on Lesbian, Gay, Bisexual, and Transgender History.

Transgender people also made groundbreaking strides in entertainment. In 2001 Jessica Crockett became the first transgender female actress to play a transgender character on television, on James Cameron's TV series Dark Angel. In 2004, the first all-transgender performance of The Vagina Monologues was held. The monologues were read by eighteen notable transgender women, and a new monologue revolving around the experiences and struggles of transgender women was included. In 2005 Alexandra Billings became the second openly transgender woman to have played a transgender character on television, which she did in the made-for-TV movie Romy and Michelle: A New Beginning. From 2007 to 2008 actress Candis Cayne played Carmelita Rainer, a transgender woman having an affair with married New York Attorney General Patrick Darling (played by William Baldwin), on the ABC prime time drama Dirty Sexy Money. The role made Cayne the first openly transgender actress to play a recurring transgender character in prime time.

The American transgender community also achieved some firsts in religion around this time. In 2002 at the Reform Jewish seminary Hebrew Union College-Jewish Institute of Religion in New York the Reform rabbi Margaret Wenig organized the first school-wide seminar at any rabbinical school which addressed the psychological, legal, and religious issues affecting people who are transsexual or intersex. In 2003 she organized the first school-wide seminar at the Reconstructionist Rabbinical College which addressed the psychological, legal, and religious issues affecting people who are transsexual or intersex. Also in 2003, Reuben Zellman became the first openly transgender person accepted to the Hebrew Union College-Jewish Institute of Religion, where he was ordained in 2010. Elliot Kukla, who came out as transgender six months before his ordination in 2006, was the first openly transgender person to be ordained by the Hebrew Union College-Jewish Institute of Religion. HUC-JIR is the oldest extant Jewish seminary in the Americas and the main seminary for training rabbis, cantors, educators, and communal workers in Reform Judaism. In 2007 Joy Ladin became the first openly transgender professor at an Orthodox Jewish institution (Stern College for Women of Yeshiva University). Emily Aviva Kapor was ordained privately by a rabbi she defined as "Conservadox" in 2005, but did not begin living as a woman until 2012, thus becoming the first openly transgender female rabbi.

In 2007, transgender model Ava Cordero became one of the first alleged victims of Jeffrey Epstein to come forward, filing the lawsuit Cordero v. Epstein with the New York Supreme Court that accused Epstein of sexually assaulting her when she was a teenager.

=== 2010s and 2020s ===
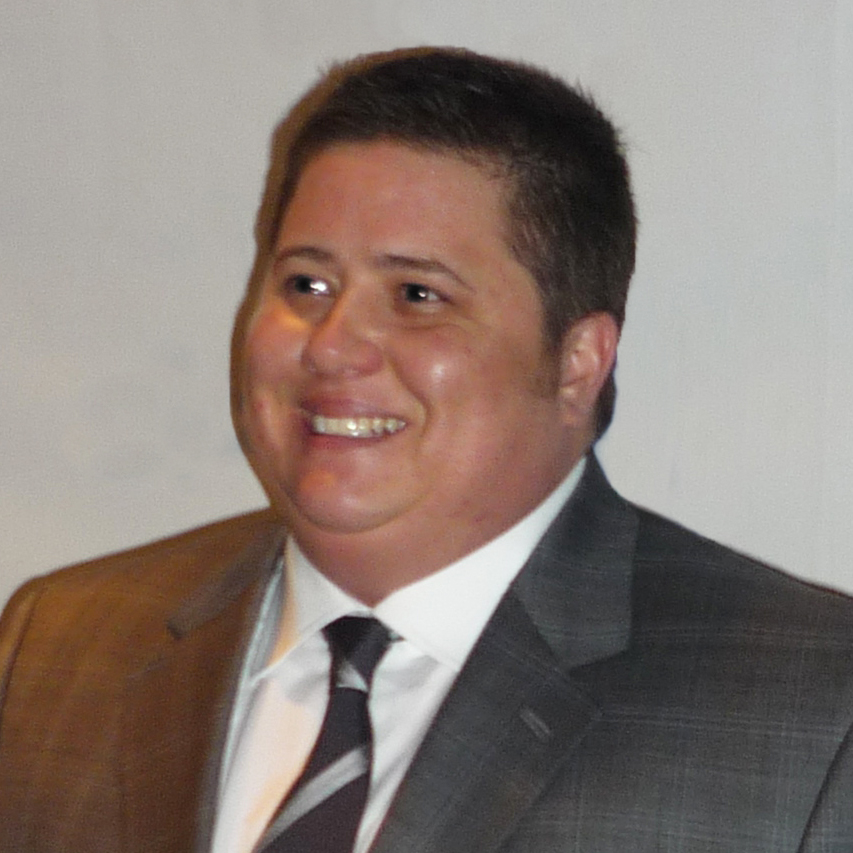
Chaz Bono appeared on Dancing with the Stars in 2011.

In the 2010s openly transgender people became increasingly prominent in entertainment. Chaz Bono became a highly visible transgender celebrity when he appeared on the 13th season of the US version of Dancing with the Stars in 2011, which was the first time an openly transgender man starred on a major network television show for something unrelated to being transgender. He also made Becoming Chaz, a documentary about his gender transition that premiered at the 2011 Sundance Film Festival. OWN (the Oprah Winfrey Network) acquired the rights to the documentary and debuted it on May 10, 2011. Also in 2011, Harmony Santana became the first openly transgender actress to receive a major acting award nomination when she was nominated by the Independent Spirit Awards as Best Supporting Actress for the movie Gun Hill Road. In 2012, Bring It On: The Musical premiered on Broadway, and it featured the first transgender teenage character ever in a Broadway show – La Cienega, a transgender woman played by actor Gregory Haney. That same year singer Laura Jane Grace of Against Me! made headlines when she publicly came out as transgender. She is the first major rock star to come out as transgender. Director Lana Wachowski, formerly known as Larry Wachowski, came out as transgender in 2012 while doing publicity for her movie Cloud Atlas. This made her the first major Hollywood director to come out as transgender.

In the 2010s transgender people also made more inroads in politics. In 2010 Amanda Simpson became the first openly transgender presidential appointee in America when she was appointed as senior technical adviser in the Commerce Department's Bureau of Industry and Security. Also in 2010, Victoria Kolakowski became the first openly transgender judge in America. In 2012 Stacie Laughton became the first openly transgender person elected as a state legislator in United States history. However, she resigned before she was sworn in and was never seated. It was revealed that she was a convicted felon and was still on probation, having served four months in Belknap County House of Corrections following a 2008 credit card fraud conviction. It was later determined that she was ineligible to serve in the New Hampshire State Legislature. Previously, in 1992 Althea Garrison had been elected as a state legislator, serving one term in the Massachusetts House of Representatives, but it was not publicly known she was transgender when she was elected. In 2017, Danica Roem was elected to the Virginia House of Delegates. She became the first openly transgender person to both be elected to a U.S. state's legislature and serve her term. Also in 2017, Tyler Titus, a transgender man, became the first openly transgender person elected to public office in Pennsylvania when he was elected to the Erie School Board. He and Phillipe Cunningham, elected to the Minneapolis City Council on the same night, became the first two openly trans men to be elected to public office in the United States. Andrea Jenkins was also elected to the Minneapolis City Council that same night, making her the first openly transgender African-American woman elected to public office in the United States.

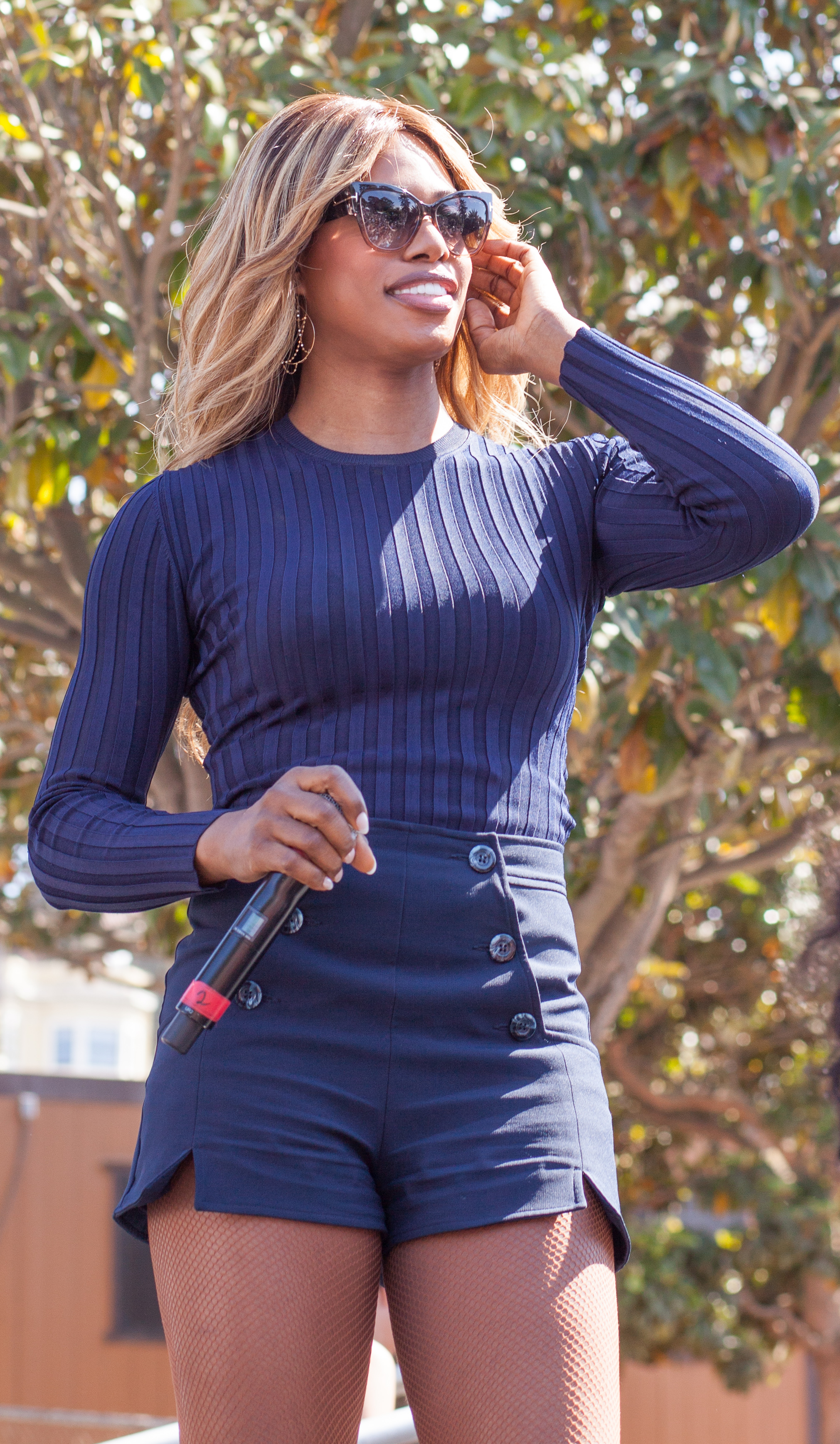
LGBTQ activist and actress Laverne Cox at San Francisco Trans March 2015

In 2014 openly transgender people became more visible. That year Laverne Cox was on the cover of the June 9, 2014, issue of Time, and was interviewed for the article "The Transgender Tipping Point" by Katy Steinmetz, which ran in that issue and the title of which was also featured on the cover; this made Cox the first openly transgender person on the cover of Time. Later in 2014 Cox became the first openly transgender person to be nominated for an Emmy in an acting category: Outstanding Guest Actress in a Comedy Series for her role as Sophia Burset in Orange Is the New Black. She did not win, however. Also that year Transgender Studies Quarterly, the first non-medical academic journal devoted to transgender issues, began publication with two openly transgender coeditors, Susan Stryker and Paisley Currah. Also in 2014 a wooden racket used by openly transgender tennis player Renée Richards and the original transgender pride flag created by openly transgender activist and Navy veteran Monica Helms, as well as items from Helms's career in the service as a submariner, were donated to the National Museum of American History, which is part of the Smithsonian. But perhaps the most important change in 2014 was that Mills College became the first single-sex college in the U.S. to adopt a policy explicitly welcoming openly transgender students, followed by Mount Holyoke becoming the first Seven Sisters college to accept transgender students. In 2014, gay trans man Lou Cutler become the first transgender man to be crowned Mr. Gay Philadelphia.

Following her divorce in 2015, Caitlyn Jenner came out in a television interview as a transgender woman. On June 1, 2015, Caitlyn Jenner (formerly Bruce Jenner) revealed her new name, Caitlyn, and her use of female pronouns officially. Many news sources at the time described Jenner as the most famous openly transgender American.

As for political organizations fighting for LGBT rights, in 2012 Allyson Robinson, who graduated West Point as Daniel Robinson, was appointed as the first Executive Director of OutServe-SLDN, the association of LGBT people serving in the military, making her the first openly transgender person to lead a national LGBT organization that does not have an explicit transgender focus. 2012 also saw the country's first government-funded campaign to combat anti-transgender discrimination, held by the D.C. Office of Human Rights.

There were also two firsts for transgender people in sports in the 2010s. Kye Allums became the first openly transgender athlete to play NCAA basketball in 2010. Allums is a transgender man who played on George Washington University's women's team. In 2012 Keelin Godsey became the first openly transgender contender for the U.S. Olympic team, but he failed to qualify and did not go to the Olympics.

Three groups – the Girl Scouts, the North American Gay Amateur Athletic Alliance, and the Episcopal Church in the United States – announced their acceptance of transgender people in this decade. In 2011, after the initial rejection of Bobby Montoya, a transgender girl, from the Girl Scouts of Colorado, the Girl Scouts of Colorado announced that "Girl Scouts is an inclusive organization and we accept all girls in Kindergarten through 12th grade as members. If a child identifies as a girl and the child's family presents her as a girl, Girl Scouts of Colorado welcomes her as a Girl Scout." Also in 2011, the North American Gay Amateur Athletic Alliance changed its policy to include transgender and bisexual players. In 2012 the Episcopal Church in the United States approved a change to their nondiscrimination canons to include gender identity and expression.

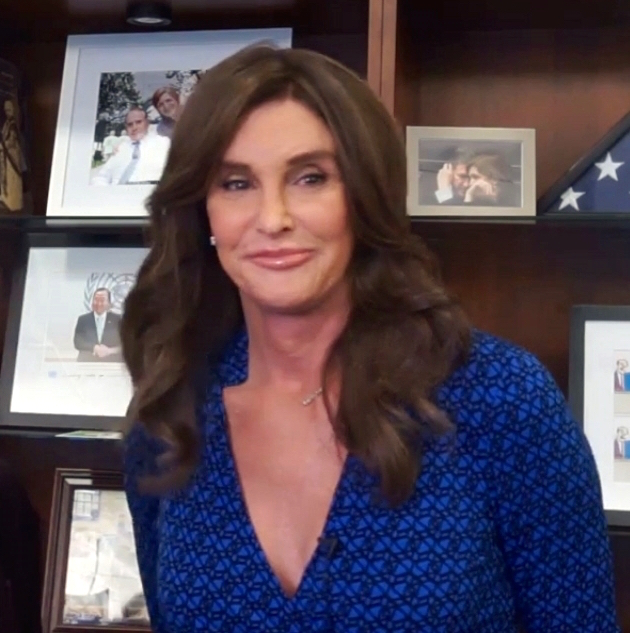
Caitlyn Jenner appeared on the cover of Vanity Fair in 2015.

Another significant change for transgender people occurred in 2013 when the fifth edition of the American Psychiatric Association's Diagnostic and Statistical Manual of Mental Disorders (DSM-5) was released. This edition eliminated the term "gender identity disorder", which was considered stigmatizing, instead referring to "gender dysphoria", which focuses attention only on those who feel distressed by their gender identity.

In 2015, an officer in the United States Army Medical Corps, Major Jamie Lee Henry, became the first-known openly transgender active duty officer in the United States Armed Forces.

It was announced on June 30, 2016, that, beginning on that date, otherwise qualified United States service members could no longer be discharged, denied reenlistment, involuntarily separated, or denied continuation of service because of being transgender. However, on July 26, 2017, President Donald Trump announced that transgender people would not be allowed to "serve in any capacity in the U.S. Military". Then on October 4 of that year, the Civil Division of the Department of Justice filed a motion to dismiss the amended complaint in Jane Doe v. Trump (about the new policy) and to oppose the application for a preliminary injunction, arguing instead "that challenge is premature several times over" and that Secretary Mattis's Interim Guidance, issued on September 14, 2017, protected currently serving transgender personnel from involuntary discharge or denial of reenlistment. Judge Colleen Kollar-Kotelly granted the plaintiffs' preliminary injunction on October 30, 2017. In the ruling, Judge Kollar-Kotelly noted the defendants' motion to dismiss the case was "perhaps compelling in the abstract, [but] wither[s] away under scrutiny". The ruling effectively reinstated the policies established prior to President Trump's tweets announcing the reinstatement of the ban, namely the retention and accession policies for transgender personnel effective on June 30, 2017.

Sarah McBride was a speaker at the Democratic National Convention in July 2016, becoming the first openly transgender person to address a major party convention in American history.

In 2016 Lambda Literary Foundation established an annual scholarship in honor of trans woman Bryn Kelly, a Lambda Literary Fellow who committed suicide in January 2016. She was the first trans woman Fellow.

On January 30, 2017, the Boy Scouts of America announced that transgender boys would be allowed to enroll in boys-only programs, effective immediately. Previously, the sex listed on an applicant's birth certificate determined eligibility for these programs; going forward, the decision would be based on the gender listed on the application. In February 2017, Joe Maldonado became the first openly transgender member of the Boy Scouts of America; the Boy Scouts' policy on transgender boys had been changed after Joe's rejection from them in 2016 for being transgender became nationally known.

Also in 2017, the Trump administration, through the Department of Justice, reversed the Obama-era policy which used Title VII of the Civil Rights Act to protect transgender employees from discrimination. The Supreme Court ruled in June 2020 that Title VII includes protections for gay and transgender employees.

In 2017, Trystan Reese case, another story of a transgender man who gave birth to a child, attracted media attention. In 2021, he published a book about it.

Also in 2017, The Advocate named "Transgender Americans" as its "Person of the Year", and listed Danica Roem, a transgender woman, as a finalist.

On June 14, 2020, the largest transgender-rights demonstration in LGBTQ history, the Brooklyn Liberation March, took place; it stretched from Grand Army Plaza to Fort Greene, Brooklyn, drawing an estimated 15,000 to 20,000 participants, and focused on supporting black trans lives.

Bostock v. Clayton County, 590 U.S. ___ (2020), was a landmark Supreme Court case in which the Court ruled on June 15, 2020 that Title VII of the Civil Rights Act of 1964 protects employees against discrimination because of their gender identity, or sexual orientation. A plaintiff in the case was Aimee Stephens, an openly transgender woman.

On June 27, 2021, Kataluna Enriquez became the first openly transgender woman to become qualified to compete in the Miss USA pageant when she won Miss Nevada USA. In 2024, Bailey Anne Kennedy became the first openly transgender woman to win the Miss Maryland USA, becoming the second-ever openly transgender delegate to Miss USA after Enriquez. The first openly transgender woman to win a pageant affiliated with the Miss America organization was Brían Nguyen, who was crowned Miss Greater Derry in 2022.

On September 12, 2021, German singer Kim Petras performed her song "Future Starts Now" at the MTV Video Music Awards in New York City, becoming the first openly transgender performer at the awards.

In March 2022, Justine Lindsay became the first openly transgender cheerleader in the National Football League when she made the Carolina Topcats, the official cheerleading squad for the Carolina Panthers.

In June 2023, Seth Marnin became the first openly transgender judge in New York and the first openly transgender male judge in the United States.

In July 2023, at the 132nd DAR Continental Congress presided over by President General Pamela Rouse Wright, the National Society Daughters of the American Revolution voted to add an amendment to their bylaws protecting transgender women from discrimination on the basis of biological sex in their membership application processes. Colonel Teagan Livingston, a transgender woman and retired U.S. Air Force officer, had previously joined the Daughters of the American Revolution in 2022.

In September 2023, the California State Assembly voted to recognize August as Transgender History Month, beginning in 2024. California is the first U.S. state to make such a declaration.

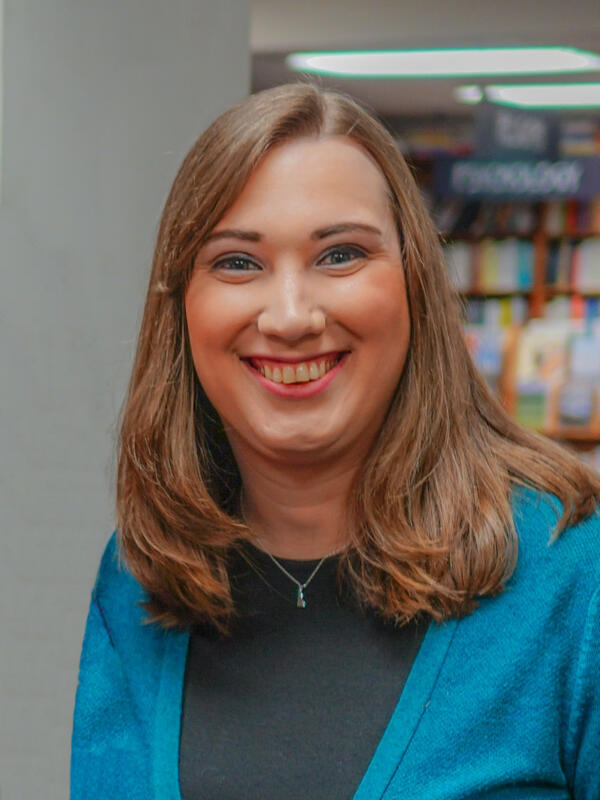
Sarah McBride, the first openly transgender person elected to the United States Congress

Some sociologists have estimated that the amount of individuals that identify as transgender in the United States has almost reached twenty million.

In January 2024, Lieutenant Colonel Bree Fram was promoted to the rank of colonel in the United States Space Force, becoming the first transgender woman colonel and the highest-ranking transgender military officer in the United States.

On November 4, 2025, Erica Deuso won the election for mayor of Downingtown, Pennsylvania. She took office on January 5, 2026, becoming the first openly transgender person to serve as a mayor in the Commonwealth of Pennsylvania. On November 5, 2024 Sarah McBride won the election for Delaware's at-large congressional district in the 2024 election. At the start of her term on January 3, 2025, she became the first openly transgender member of the United States Congress.

On March 13, 2026, New York City mayor Zohran Mamdani created the Office of LGBTQIA+ Affairs and appointed Taylor Brown as the inaugural director, making her the first openly transgender person to head a New York City agency or department and making her the highest-ranking transgender public official in the city.

== Recent history by topic (1970s–present) ==
=== Education ===
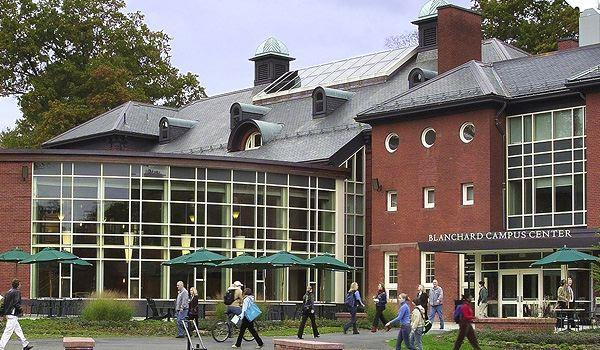
Mount Holyoke College became the first all women's college to accept openly transgender students in 2014.

Sandy Stone is an openly transgender woman whose essay, titled "The Empire Strikes Back: A Posttranssexual Manifesto", and published in 1987 in response to the anti-transsexual book Transsexual Empire, has been cited as the origin of transgender studies.

In 2012, Campus Pride, founded in 2001, issued its first list of the most welcoming places for trans students to go to college.

In 2014, Mills College became the first single-sex college in the U.S. to adopt a policy explicitly welcoming openly transgender students. The policy states that applicants not assigned to the female sex at birth but who self-identify as women are welcome, as are applicants who identify as neither male or female if they were assigned to the female sex at birth. It also states that students assigned to the female sex at birth who have legally become male prior to applying are not eligible unless they apply to the graduate program, which is coeducational, although female students who become male after enrolling may stay and graduate.

Also in 2014, Mount Holyoke College became the first Seven Sisters college to accept openly transgender students. That same year, Transgender Studies Quarterly, the first non-medical academic journal devoted to transgender issues, began publication, with two openly transgender coeditors, Susan Stryker and Paisley Currah.

In 2015, Schools In Transition: A Guide for Supporting Transgender Students in K-12 Schools was introduced; it is a first-of-its-kind publication for school administrations, teachers, and parents about how to provide safe and supportive environments for all transgender students in kindergarten through twelfth grade. Its authors are the Transgender Youth Project Staff Attorney for the National Center for Lesbian Rights (NCLR), Gender Spectrum's Senior Director for Professional Development and Family Services, the National Education Association, the American Civil Liberties Union, and the Human Rights Campaign.

In 2016, guidance was issued by the Departments of Justice and Education stating that schools which receive federal money must treat a student's gender identity as their sex (for example, in regard to bathrooms). This policy was revoked in 2017.

In 2019, University of Tennessee graduate Hera Jay Brown became the first transgender woman to be selected for a Rhodes Scholarship. Two non-binary scholars were also selected for the 2020 class.

=== Employment ===
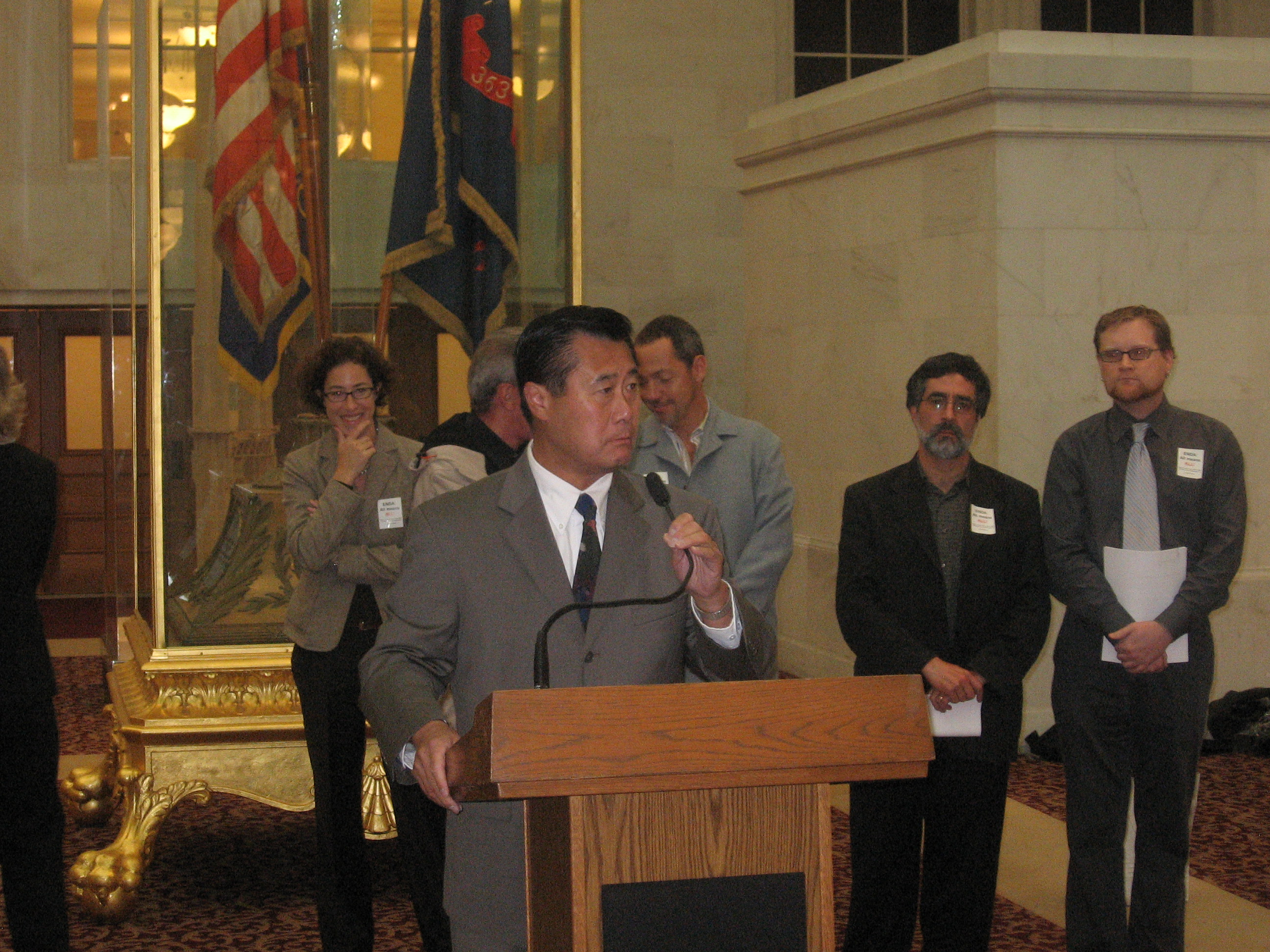
San Francisco city officials and activists met in 2007 to urge Congress to include transgender people in the Employment Non-Discrimination Act.

In 1971, Paula Grossman was fired from her 14-year position as an elementary music teacher in Bernards Township, New Jersey after coming out as transgender. She never returned to teaching and died in 2003.

In August 2005, it was revealed that New Jersey public school teacher Mr. Herb McCaffrey had undergone gender-reassignment surgery in the middle of the previous school year and would return as Ms. Kerri Nicole McCaffrey, becoming the first openly transgender teacher in New Jersey in over thirty years. Because McCaffrey was non-tenured, she hid her identity until the end of that 2005 school year and only revealed her changed name and status publicly that summer. Despite controversy, McCaffrey kept her 5th grade teaching job. She still teaches in Mendham Boro, New Jersey as of 2015.

In 2012, Kylar Broadus, founder of the Trans People of Color Coalition of Columbia, Missouri, spoke to the Senate in favor of the Employment Non-Discrimination Act. His speech was the first-ever Senate testimony from an openly transgender witness.

The Obama administration announced on June 30, 2016 that, effective immediately, otherwise qualified United States service members could no longer be discharged, denied reenlistment, involuntarily separated, or denied continuation of service because of being transgender. This was reversed by President Donald Trump, who, in 2017, declared via Twitter that transgender individuals would not be allowed to "serve in any capacity in the U.S. Military".

This set off a long legal battle. Although several judges issued injunctions to delay Trump's proposal, the Supreme Court ultimately allowed the Trump administration to proceed with its plan. From April 2019, existing transgender personnel could continue to serve, but new transgender personnel could not join. In 2017, the Trump administration, through the Department of Justice, reversed the Obama-era policy which used Title VII of the Civil Rights Act to protect transgender employees from discrimination. New president Joe Biden reversed the policy on January 25, 2021.

Bostock v. Clayton County, 590 U.S. ___ (2020), was a landmark Supreme Court case in which the Court ruled (on June 15, 2020) that Title VII of the Civil Rights Act of 1964 protects employees against discrimination because of their gender identity (or sexual orientation). A plaintiff in the case was Aimee Stephens, an openly transgender woman.

=== Health ===
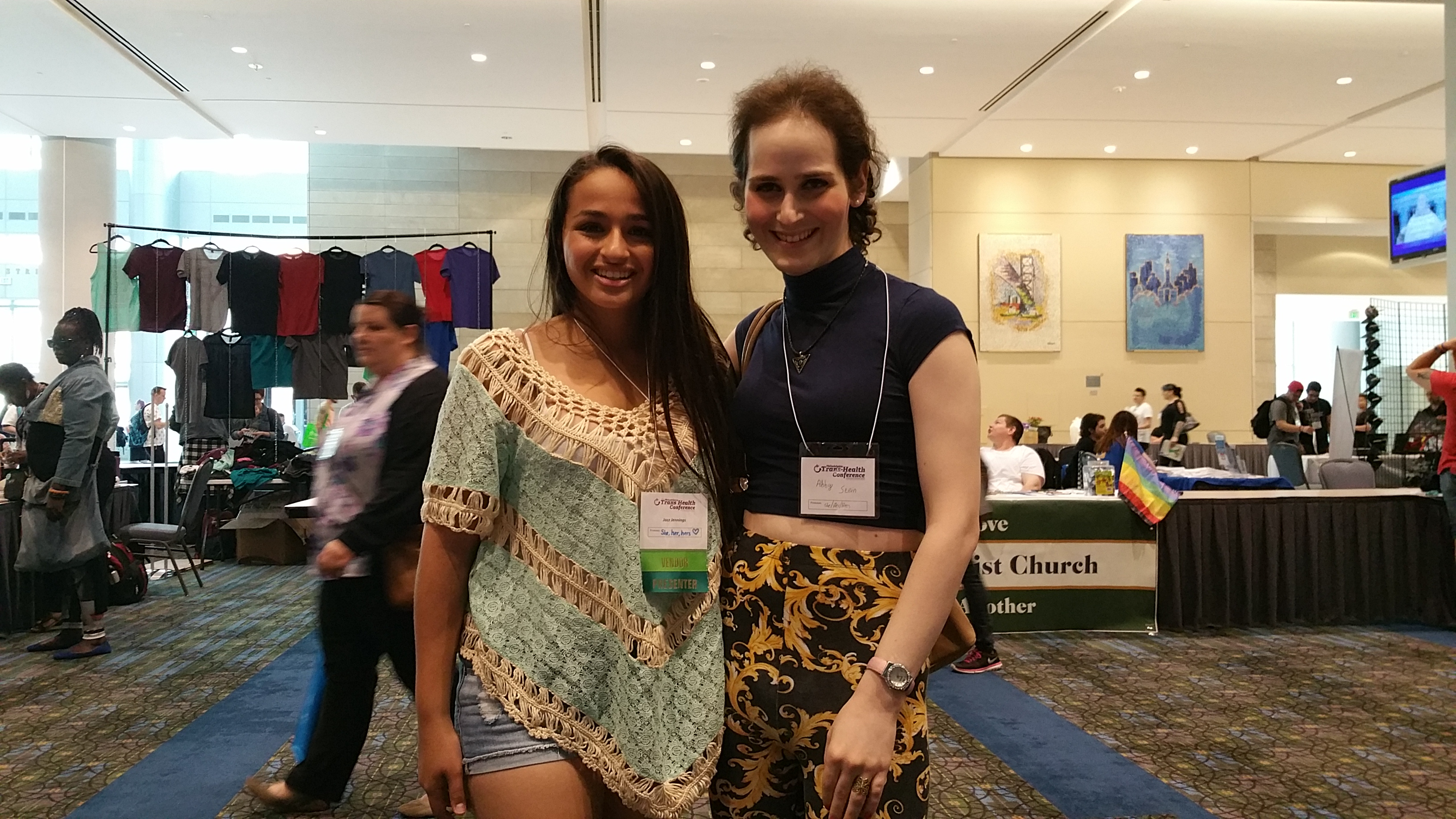
Trans activists Jazz Jennings and Abby Stein at the Philadelphia Trans Health Conference 2016

In 1980, transgender people were officially classified by the American Psychiatric Association as having "gender identity disorder".

In 2003, Dr. Marci Bowers, a gynecologic surgeon and transgender woman, joined the practice of Dr. Stanley Biber in Trinidad, Colorado, and is acknowledged as the first woman and first trans woman to perform many vaginoplasties. Sheila Kirk, another trans woman, performed fewer than 10 vaginoplasties earlier while at the University of Pittsburgh. She now practices primarily in Burlingame, California, and initiated transgender surgical training programs for vaginoplasty in Tel Aviv, Israel at Sheba Hospital (2014), at Mt. Sinai Icahn School of Medicine in New York (2016), at Denver Health (2016), and at Toronto/Women's College Hospital (2019). Bowers also performed the first two "live vaginoplasties" at the WPATH. GEI courses at New York's Mt. Sinai Hospital in 2018 and 2019.

In February 2007, Norman Spack co-founded Boston Children's Hospital's Gender Management Service (GeMS) clinic; it is America's first clinic to treat transgender children.

In 2009, America's professional association of endocrinologists established best practices for transgender children that included prescribing puberty-suppressing drugs to preteens followed by hormone therapy beginning at about age 16. In 2012 the American Academy of Child and Adolescent Psychiatry echoed these recommendations.

In 2011, the Center of Excellence for Transgender Health published the first-ever protocols for transgender primary care.

Also in 2011, the Veterans Health Administration issued a directive stipulating that all transgender and intersex veterans are entitled to the same level of care "without discrimination" as other veterans, consistent across all Veterans Administration healthcare facilities.

In 2012, the American Psychiatric Association issued official position statements supporting the care and civil rights of transgender and gender non-conforming individuals.

In 2013, the fifth edition of the American Psychiatric Association's Diagnostic and Statistical Manual of Mental Disorders (DSM-5) was released. This edition eliminated the term "gender identity disorder", which was considered stigmatizing, instead referring to "gender dysphoria", which focuses attention only on those who feel distressed by their gender identity.

Also in 2013, at the request of a panel of endocrinologists, U.S. News & World Report, for the first time in its hospital rankings, assigned additional points to hospitals that had programs designed to meet the needs of transgender youth.

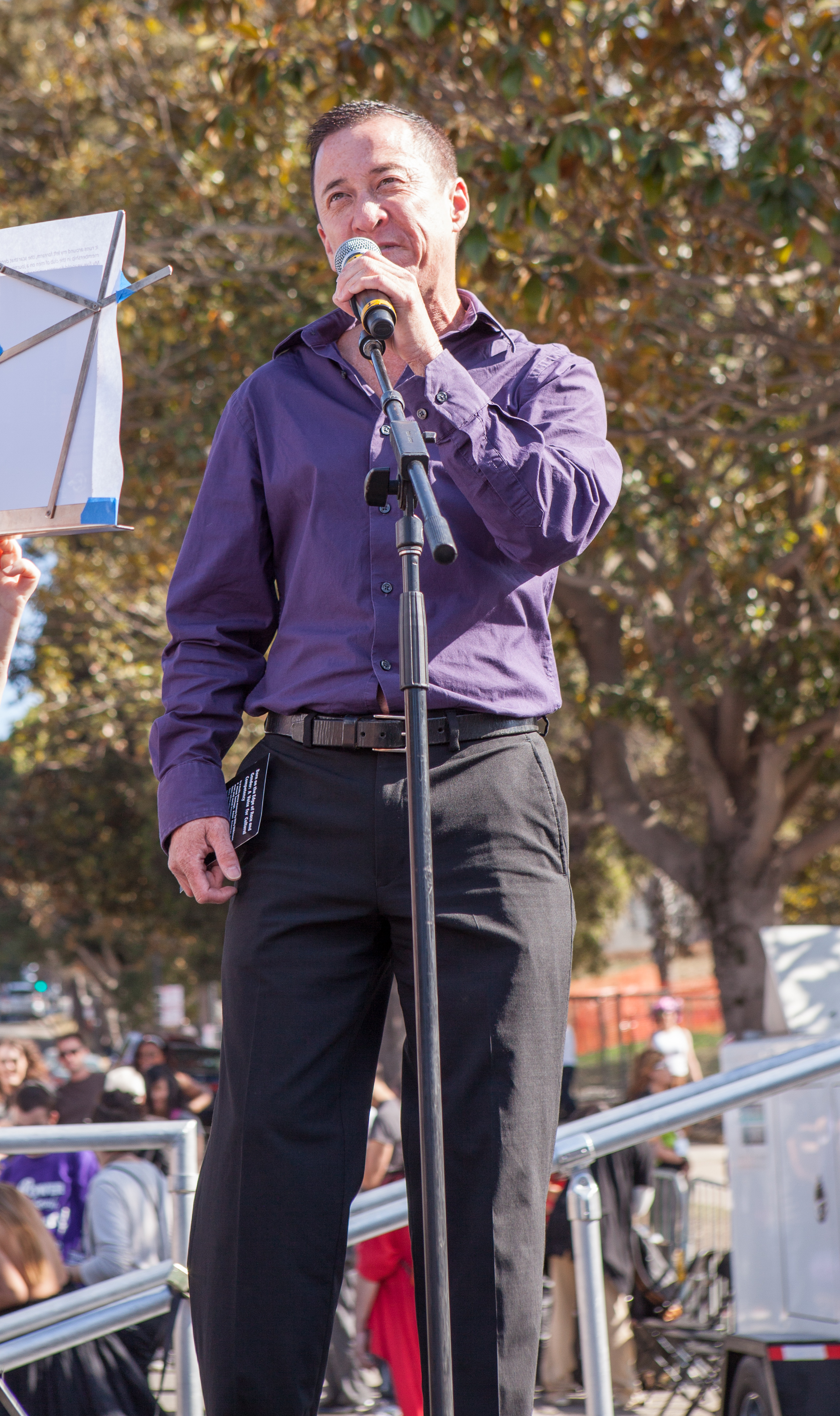
Willy Wilkinson, transgender writer and public health consultant, at San Francisco Trans March 2015

In 2015, the American Psychological Association's Council of Representatives adopted "Guidelines for Psychological Practice with Transgender and Gender Nonconforming People" at the Association's 123rd Annual Convention. Such guidelines set ideals to which the American Psychological Association encourages psychologists to aspire. According to the "Guidelines for Psychological Practice with Transgender and Gender Nonconforming People", psychologists who work with transgender or gender nonconforming people should seek to provide acceptance, support and understanding without making assumptions about their clients' gender identities or gender expressions.

In 2017, the Defense Health Agency for the first time approved payment for gender-affirming surgery for an active-duty U.S. military service member. The patient, an infantry soldier who identifies as a woman, had already begun a course of treatment for gender reassignment. The procedure, which the treating doctor deemed medically necessary, was performed on November 14 at a private hospital, since military hospitals lack the requisite surgical expertise.

=== Legal rights ===
The Trans Rights Indicator Project (TRIP) provides country-year data on legal rights protections relevant to transgender minorities. Trans journalist Erin Reed also tracks anti-transgender legislation on her site's Anti-Trans Legal Risk Assessment Map. Legal issues regarding transgender persons in the United States began in 1966 with Mtr. of Anonymous v. Weiner, concerning a person who wanted their birth certificate name and sex updated following gender-affirming surgery. Changes to passports, licenses, birth certificates, and other official documents remained a theme from the 60s through 2010, when the State Department allowed gender on U.S. passports to be altered.

Other major themes in transgender-related legislation or regulatory action included provisions to protect against discrimination in housing, employment, health care, public restroom usage, the military, insurance coverage, and other areas of public life. On January 25, 2021, U.S. President Joe Biden issued an executive order which revoked the transgender military ban.

=== Identity and status issues ===
A transgender symbol

In 2003 Conservative Judaism's Committee on Jewish Law and Standards approved a rabbinic ruling on the status of transsexuals. The ruling concluded that individuals who have undergone full sexual reassignment surgery, and whose sexual reassignment has been recognized by civil authorities, are considered to have changed their sex status according to Jewish law. Furthermore, it concluded that sex reassignment surgery is an acceptable treatment under Jewish law for individuals diagnosed with gender dysphoria.

In 2014 the American Medical Association adopted a policy stating that transgender people should not be required to undergo genital surgery in order to update legal identification documents, including birth certificates.

Also in 2014, Facebook introduced dozens of options for users to specify their gender, including a custom gender option, as well as allowing users to select between three pronouns: "him", "her" or "their". Later that year Facebook added a gender-neutral option for users to use when identifying family members, for example Parent (gender neutral) and Child (gender neutral).

Also in 2014, Google Plus introduced a new gender category called "Custom", which generates a freeform text field and a pronoun field, and also provides users with an option to limit who can see their gender. The conflate of terms "gender identity" and "sexual orientation" in LGBT research comes from limitations in data accessibility.

=== Marriage and parenting ===
In 2008 Thomas Beatie, an American transgender man, became pregnant, making international news. He wrote an article about his experience of pregnancy in The Advocate. The Washington Post blogger Emil Steiner called Beatie the first "legally" pregnant man on record, in reference to certain states' and federal legal recognition of Beatie as a man. Beatie gave birth to a girl named Susan Juliette Beatie on June 29, 2008. In 2010 Guinness World Records recognized Beatie as the world's "First Married Man to Give Birth".

In 2018, Transgender Health reported that a transgender woman in the United States breastfed her adopted baby; this was the first known case of a transgender woman breastfeeding.

=== Violence against transgender people and their partners ===
In 1993 Brandon Teena, a transgender man, was raped and murdered in Nebraska. In 1999 he became the subject of a biopic entitled Boys Don't Cry, starring Hilary Swank as Brandon Teena, for which Swank won an Academy Award.

The Transgender Day of Remembrance was founded in 1998 by Gwendolyn Ann Smith, an American transgender graphic designer, columnist, and activist, to memorialize the murder of transgender woman Rita Hester in Massachusetts in 1998. The Transgender Day of Remembrance is held every year on November 20 and now memorializes all those murdered due to transphobic hate and prejudice.

In 2002 Gwen Araujo, a transgender woman, was murdered in California by four cisgender men after they discovered she was transgender. The case made international news and became a rallying cause for the transgender and ultimately the larger LGBT community. The events of the case, including both criminal trials, were portrayed in a television movie, A Girl Like Me: The Gwen Araujo Story.

In 2008 Angie Zapata, a transgender woman, was murdered in Greeley, Colorado. Allen Andrade was convicted of first-degree murder and committing a bias-motivated crime, because he killed her after he learned that she was transgender. Andrade was the first person in the US to be convicted of a hate crime involving a transgender victim. Angie Zapata's story and murder were featured on Univision's Aqui y Ahora television show on November 1, 2009.

In 2015, 21 transgender women were murdered, most being women of color. In 2016, the death toll reached 21 just through September, placing 2016 on pace to be the deadliest year on record.

In 2017, then-Attorney General Jeff Sessions announced that he had instructed federal authorities to review murders of transgender people that occurred recently, to see if they were hate crimes or if there was one person or group responsible for them. Earlier that year, in March, six Democratic lawmakers had written a letter on the subject to the Department of Justice.

In March and April 2020, four transgender women were killed in Puerto Rico, the body of two victims found in a charred car.

== American transgender people ==
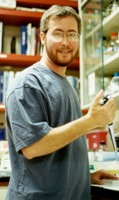
Dr. Ben Barres

- Ben Barres was Chair of the Neurobiology department at Stanford University School of Medicine. His research focused on the interaction between neurons and glial cells in the nervous system.
- Chaz Bono became a highly visible transgender celebrity when he appeared on the 13th season of the US version of Dancing with the Stars in 2011. This was the first time an openly transgender man starred on a major network television show for something unrelated to being transgender. He also made Becoming Chaz, a documentary about his gender transition that premiered at the 2011 Sundance Film Festival. OWN (the Oprah Winfrey Network) acquired the rights to the documentary and debuted it on May 10, 2011.
- Kate Bornstein is an author, playwright, performance artist, and gender theorist. She was ex-communicated from the Church of Scientology and now writes extensively on gender nonconformity.
- Marci Bowers is a gynecologic surgeon, the first woman and first trans person to perform MTF/FTM genital surgeries. Bowers is the first North American surgeon to perform functional restoration surgery for survivors of female genital mutilation/cutting (FGM/c). Her surgical efforts have been publicly chronicled for noted transgender individuals, Jazz Jennings in TLC's I am Jazz, Thomas Beattie (The Doctors) and Isis (Tyra Banks Show). She also appeared in the 2004 CBS show, CSI: Las Vegas.
- Jennifer Finney Boylan is an author, political activist, and professor of English at Colby College in Maine. Her 2003 autobiography, She's Not There: A Life in Two Genders, was the first book by an openly transgender American to become a bestseller. In 2013, Boylan was chosen as the first openly transgender co-chair of GLAAD's National Board of Directors.
- Aleshia Brevard is a performer and author, and was one of Harry Benjamin's earliest patients, and one of the first people to undergo SRS in the United States.
- The Lady Chablis (March 11, 1957 – September 8, 2016) was an actress, and writer.
- Lynn Conway, a computer scientist noted for the Mead and Conway revolution in VLSI design and the invention of generalized dynamic instruction handling, came out as transgender in 1999. Her transition was more widely reported in 2000 in profiles in Scientific American and the Los Angeles Times, and she founded a well-known website providing emotional and medical resources and advice to transgender people. Parts of the website have been translated into most of the world's major languages.
- Laverne Cox is an American actress, reality star, and transgender activist. Cox has a recurring role in the Netflix series Orange Is the New Black as Sophia Burset, a transgender woman who went to prison for credit-card fraud, and is the hairdresser for many of the inmates. Cox is best known for her role on Orange Is the New Black, for being a contestant on the first season of VH1's I Want to Work for Diddy and for producing and co-hosting the VH1 makeover television series TRANSform Me (which made her the first African-American transgender person to produce and star in her own TV show). Cox was on the cover of the June 9, 2014 issue of Time, and was interviewed for the article "The Transgender Tipping Point" by Katy Steinmetz, which ran in that issue and the title of which was also featured on the cover; this makes Cox the first openly transgender person on the cover of Time. Later in 2014 Cox became the first openly transgender person to be nominated for an Emmy in an acting category, Outstanding Guest Actress in a Comedy Series for her role as Sophia Burset in Orange Is the New Black, though she did not win.
- Asia Kate Dillon is a non-binary actor. They are notable for the role of Taylor Mason in Billions, reported to be the first non-binary character on mainstream North American television.
- On October 25, 2017, it was announced that transgender actors MJ Rodriguez, Indya Moore, Dominique Jackson, Hailie Sahar, and Angelica Ross and cisgender actors Ryan Jamaal Swain, Billy Porter and Dyllón Burnside had been cast in main roles for the FX drama series Pose. The series became the largest transgender cast ever assembled for main parts on a recurring scripted series.
- Laura Jane Grace is the first major rock star to come out as transgender, which she did in 2012. She is the founder, lead singer, songwriter, and guitarist of the punk rock band Against Me!
- Caitlyn Jenner is an American former track and field athlete and current television personality. Jenner came to international attention when, while still publicly identifying as a man, she won the gold medal in the decathlon at the 1976 Summer Olympics held in Montreal. Subsequently, she starred in several made-for-TV movies and was briefly Erik Estrada's replacement on the TV series CHiPs. Jenner was married for nearly 24 years to Kris Jenner (formerly Kardashian); the couple and their children appeared beginning in 2007 on the television reality series Keeping Up with the Kardashians. Following her divorce in 2015, Jenner came out in a television interview as a transgender woman. On June 1, 2015, Caitlyn Jenner officially revealed her new name. Many news sources have described Jenner as the most famous openly transgender American.
- Sophia Hutchins was an American socialite, media personality, businesswoman, and charity executive. Hutchings, a transgender woman, was notable for being the first transgender person to graduate from Pepperdine University. Hutchins graduated with her Bachelor of Science (B.S.) degree in economics and finance. While attending Pepperdine, Hutchins served on the student government, the first transgender person to achieve this feat. Hutchins died in an ATV accident in Malibu, California on July 2, 2025. She was 29.
- Jazz Jennings is an American YouTube personality, spokesmodel, television personality and LGBTQ rights activist. Jennings, a transgender woman, is notable for being the youngest person to become a national transgender figure.
- Katastrophe is the first openly transgender rapper, and co-founder of Original Plumbing, a magazine for trans men.
- Elliot Kukla is a rabbi at the Bay Area Jewish Healing Center. He came out as transgender six months before his ordination in 2006. He was the first openly transgender person to be ordained by the Reform Jewish seminary Hebrew Union College-Jewish Institute of Religion in Los Angeles. Later, at the request of a friend of his who was also transgender, he wrote the first blessing sanctifying the sex-change process to be included in the 2007 edition of the Union for Reform Judaism's resource manual for gay, lesbian, bisexual and transgender inclusion called Kulanu.
- Chelsea Manning is a United States Army soldier and whistleblower who was convicted in July 2013 of violations of the Espionage Act and other offenses, after providing WikiLeaks the largest set of classified documents ever leaked to the public. On January 17, 2017, President Barack Obama commuted Manning's sentence to a total of seven years of confinement dating from the date of arrest (May 20, 2010) by military authorities.
- Billy Martin, known professionally as Poppy Z. Brite, is an American author. He initially achieved fame in the gothic horror genre of literature in the early 1990s after publishing a string of successful novels and short story collections. Martin's recent work has moved into the related genre of dark comedy, with many works set in the New Orleans restaurant world. Martin's novels are typically standalone books but may feature recurring characters from previous novels and short stories.
- Janet Mock is a columnist, author, editor, and trans activist. Her story was first highlighted in a 2011 Marie Claire article about her and her life.
- Jennifer Pritzker came out as transgender in 2013 and thus became the world's first openly transgender billionaire.
- Lena Raine is a composer who has worked on the soundtracks for multiple video games and other projects, such as Celeste, Minecraft, and the second chapter of Deltarune.
- Angelica Ross, cast member of the first two seasons of Pose, featured on the eighth season of American Horror Story, becoming the first transgender thespian to be cast a series lead / main cast member on two different scripted television shows.
- Julia Serano is a trans activist, speaker, and author of three books on transgender issues, including Whipping Girl, a transfeminist investigation of transmisogyny, a term that Serano coined for the book.
- Amanda Simpson, former Deputy Assistant Secretary of Defense for Operational Energy. First openly transgender woman U.S. Presidential appointee. She contributed to the development and/or testing of numerous operation missile systems including Maverick, AMRAAM, Standard, Phalanx, TOW, RAM, JAGM, ACM, HARM, JSOW, MALD, ESSM, SilentEyes, Sidewinder, Sparrow, Paveway and Tomahawk.
- ND Stevenson is a multi awarded comic writer and artist, formerly co-executive producer of the animated show She-Ra and the Princesses of Power. They started their transition in July 2020 and publicly announced in their Twitter and Instagram identifying as a non-binary transgender lesbian.
- Mattilda Bernstein Sycamore is an activist and author. She organized with ACT UP and Fed Up Queers and writes about queer assimilation and gentrification.
- Max Wolf Valerio is a Native American poet, memoir writer, essayist and actor. His 2006 memoir The Testosterone Files describes his experience as a trans man.
- Lana Wachowski is the first major Hollywood director to come out as transgender. She came out in 2012 while doing publicity for her movie Cloud Atlas.
- In 2016, director Lilly Wachowski disclosed to the Windy City Times that she, like her sister Lana, is transgender, after an interview with the Daily Mail.
- Kortney Ryan Ziegler is a filmmaker, visual artist, writer, and scholar based in Oakland, California. His artistic and academic work focuses on queer/trans issues, body image, racialized sexualities, gender, performance and black queer theory. Ziegler is also the first person in history to receive the PhD of African American Studies from Northwestern University.

== See also ==
- Transgender history
- Current issues of gender inequality in the United States for transgender people
- List of transgender-rights organizations in the United States
- Transgender rights in the United States
- Transgender people's legal rights in the United States
- Transgender disenfranchisement in the United States
- Transgender personnel in the United States military
- Transphobia in the United States
- LGBT people in prison
- Timeline of LGBT history in the United States
