= BASL (disambiguation) =

BASL or Black American Sign Language is a dialect of American Sign Language.

BASL may also refer to:

- Bar Association of Sri Lanka
- Big Apple Softball League
