= Hannah Nokes =

American transgender pioneer (1898–1972)

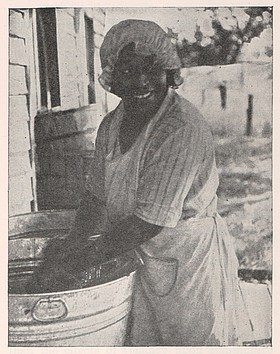
- Nokes in 1936
- Born: May 8, 1898; Sterling, Virginia, U.S.
- Died: June 26, 1972 (aged 73–74)
- Occupation: Domestic worker
- Known for: Early transgender visibility in the American South

Hannah Nokes (May 8, 1898 – June 26, 1972) was an American transgender woman and community figure in Virginia during the early 20th century. She attracted attention in multiple newspapers after testifying during a 1932 murder trial and was later profiled for a 1936 Rural Electrification News piece.

== Biography ==
Nokes was born to unmarried parents near Sterling, Virginia. No birth certificate was issued for her, as the Commonwealth of Virginia did not begin issuing them until 1912. She spent her early life using her mother's name, Johnson. As an adult, she registered for the draft under her legal name, though it is unlikely that she saw actual service, and lived on Dranesville Road on the Fairfax County/Herndon border. She was a domestic worker for white families by occupation, and she opened her home, which she rented, to boarders and travelers. She transitioned well before her thirties.

On January 11, 1932, at the recommendation of nearby resident Robert Hughes, George Crawford spent a night at Nokes' home. Crawford was subsequently accused of murder, with Nokes and several other recent acquaintances called as witnesses. Charles Hamilton Houston defended the accused. Multiple newspapers of the time called public attention to her being transgender. Twice during the trial, Houston asked Nokes' nephew if she was his uncle or his aunt.

When court reporters covered the trial, they referred to Nokes using descriptions including "red-wigged boy-girl", "mysterious witness", "queer witness", and "negro man ... who wears women's clothing". Contemporary historians note that modern concepts of transgender identity did not exist in that time, and that some media sources were either more accepting of Nokes' gender identity or more unaccepting of it, and made pronoun choices or decisions to use either her preferred name Hannah or her legal name.

In 1936, Rural Electrification News—a government publication of the Rural Electrification Administration—profiled her when she got electricity in her home. They previously had electrified a demonstration farm a mile away owned by Hughes' family. Her article was put together to promote a New Deal program and portrayed her as a working-class success story. As Nokes had poor literacy, the contract to electrify her home was signed by one of her employers, Mrs. McMillen. The feature also described Nokes as "probably the happiest laundress in the Commonwealth of Virginia" and contained a photo of Nokes wearing an apron and mobcap, in which she was handwashing laundry in a tub. No further photos of Nokes are known to have been taken.

Nokes received a social security account and number no earlier than the late 1950s. She died of a heart attack at Fairfax Hospital on June 26, 1972; obituaries in the Loudoun Times-Mirror and the Northern Virginia Sun respected her gender, and the latter described her as a "retired domestic worker" and a longtime member of Salem Baptist Church. Nokes was described by the 2024 Loudoun County Courthouse nomination for National Historic Landmark designation as "one of the earliest known instances of an openly transgender person testifying in Virginia court" and subsequently profiled by Amy Bertsch for the book Queer Virginia.

== See also ==
- African American LGBTQ+ history
- Transgender history in the United States
- Lucy Hicks Anderson
