= Seth Marnin =

21st-century American lawyer and judge

Judge of the New York Court of Claims
- Incumbent
- Assumed office June 2023

Personal details
- Born: Albany, New York, U.S.
- Education: UConn Law School (JD); SUNY Albany (BA, MA, ABD)
- Occupation: Lawyer, judge, academic administrator

Seth M. Marnin is an American attorney and academic administrator who is the first openly transgender male judge in the United States. Governor Kathy Hochul appointed Marnin to the bench of the New York Court of Claims in 2023. A graduate of the University of Connecticut School of Law and SUNY Albany, he previously held senior leadership positions at Columbia University and the Anti-Defamation League.

== Life and career ==
Seth M. Marnin was born in Albany, New York. His father was a city bus driver, and his mother, a former teacher, was self-employed as a court transcriptionist and resume writer. Marnin graduated from the State University of New York at Albany with a BA in Women's Studies and Sociology and an MA in Liberal Studies and completed PhD coursework in history with a focus on U.S. public policy and gender. While working as director of GLBT resources at the University of Connecticut in Storrs, he attended the University of Connecticut School of Law in Hartford and earned his JD in 2006.

After completing law school, Marnin practiced employment law at Outten & Golden LLP, served as vice president for civil rights at the Anti-Defamation League, and served as director of training and education at the Office of Equal Opportunity and Affirmative Action at Columbia University. Before joining Columbia University, he founded a consulting firm to advise nonprofits on nondiscrimination, sexual harassment, equal opportunity, and affirmative action. He has also worked as deputy director for the Center for HIV Law and Policy.

In early 2023, Governor Kathy Hochul nominated Marnin as a judge of the New York Court of Claims. The New York State Senate voted to confirm his appointment in June 2023, making him the first openly transgender judge in New York and the first openly transgender male judge in the United States. Some openly transgender women have served on the bench, including Phyllis Frye in Texas and Andi Mudryk and Victoria Kolakowski in California.

Marnin is a member of the New York City Bar Association, the LGBT Bar Association of New York, and the International Association of LGBTQ+ Judges.

== Personal life ==
Marnin is an observant Jew. He became board chair of Keshet in January 2019 and served through May 2023.
