= Big Apple Softball League =

LGBTQ softball league in New York City

- Sport: Softball
- Founded: 1977; 49 years ago
- No. of teams: 39
- Website: bigapplesoftball.com

The Big Apple Softball League (BASL) is an LGBTQ softball league located in the New York City area. The league plays its regular season from late April through early August and holds its playoffs in August. Teams from this league also compete in tournaments in the US and Canada, including the NAGAAA's Gay World Series.

== History ==
The league was founded in 1977 as The Manhattan Community Athletic Association (MCAA). In its first season the league consisted of 12 teams. The winner that season was the Ramrod Bar and Grill team. The Ramrod team flew to San Francisco to take on the Badlands of the San Francisco Community Softball League to play in the first Gay World Series in front of a crowd as large as 5,000 people. Badlands defeated Ramrod, two games to none.

In 1980, the league changed its name to its current name. At this point in the league's history, there were 16 teams. In 1981, the league moved to an arc pitch style of softball play to conform to the North American Gay Amateur Athletic Alliance (NAGAAA).

In 1994, the league hosted the Play for Life tournament on the 4th of July Weekend, a benefit for HIV research.

In 2007, the league celebrated its 30th season of play and is made up of 39 teams, spread across 5 divisions by skill level.

In 2009, BASL introduced the Women+ Division, which has now blossomed into two divisions, Mousseau (named after Jody Mousseau - longtime player and board member) and Green-Batten (named after Cynthia Green and Scott Batten - who both helped in the development of all-female teams prior to the creation of the Women's Division).

== Participation at the NAGAAA & ASANA World Series ==
In 1977, the bar owner of the San Francisco Badlands Bar together with BASL Founder Chuck Dima and other NY bar owners arranged to send the New York Ramrod team to San Francisco to play a three-game series at James P. Lang Field in what was called, and what has now become, the first Gay World Series.

The Big Apple Softball League has also had a great deal of history with the tournament. In 1984, The New York Falcons were disqualified by the NAGAAA for having a straight-identified player on the team. The NAGAAA stated, at that time, that the tournament was for LGBTQ players only. This squabble at the World Series was noted in an article in the LGBT newsmagazine The Advocate. The next year, the NAGAAA changed its rules to allow straight-identified players.

The league hosted the 1986 World Series and has had a great deal of success at the tournament. In 29 NAGAAA Tournaments, The BASL has earned 3 wins and several overall Top 5 finishes.

== League Events ==
Big Apple Softball is a Social League and hosts several events and fundraisers throughout the year. Their league-wide events are their HoliGay Party, All-Star Game, Opening Party and Closing Party. They also host several smaller, team or division-wide events that are more popular throughout the playing season.

Teams also travel to tournaments throughout the country, including traveling to Las Vegas, Orlando, Kansas City, Austin, Philadelphia, Boston & Providence, Rhode Island.

== The league today ==
The league currently hosts two playing seasons. A shortened Fall Season that has two divisions and a longer Spring season that has over 30 teams in over 5 divisions, sectioned off by gender-identity and desired competition level. Almost all the teams in the league are now sponsored by at least one organization such as a local business or bar. Some sponsors include Boxers bar, GYM Sportsbar, Dive Bar & Prudential Insurance.
