= Amateur Sports Alliance of North America =

Non-profit sports organization

The Amateur Sports Alliance of North America (ASANA) is a non-profit women's softball organization.

ASANA formed in 2007 as an offshoot of the North American Gay Amateur Athletic Alliance (NAGAAA). The current commissioner is Angela Smith of Atlanta, Georgia.

Teams from 23 cities participate in the ASANA Softball World Series each year, with the venue rotating among the member cities.

ASANA offers softball for women softball players of various skill and age levels. Six divisions comprise the women's division: A, B, C, D, E and 50+. The "A" division is considered the most challenging division, and the E division consists of mostly recreational-level players.

== Previous World Series Locations ==
Year	Host city
2015	Orlando, Florida
2014	Las Vegas, Nevada
2013	Portland, Oregon
2012	San Diego, California
2011	Philadelphia, Pennsylvania
2010	Las Vegas, Nevada
2009	Madison, Wisconsin
2008	Seattle, Washington
2007	Phoenix, Arizona
2006	Fort Lauderdale, Florida
2005	San Diego, California
