= Victoria Kolakowski =

American judge

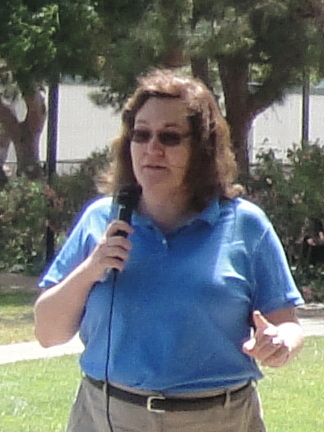

Judge of the Alameda County Superior Court
- Incumbent
- Assumed office January 4, 2011

Personal details
- Born: August 29, 1961 (age 65) New York City, New York, U.S.
- Spouse: Cynthia Laird (m. 2008)
- Education: New College of Florida (BA); Louisiana State University (JD) (MPA); Tulane University (MS); University of New Orleans (MS); Pacific School of Religion (MDiv)

Victoria Kolakowski (born August 29, 1961) is an American lawyer who serves as a judge of the Alameda County Superior Court since January 2011. She is the first openly transgender person to serve as a trial court judge of general jurisdiction in the United States, the first elected to a judgeship, and the first to serve as any type of judge in California. (Houston Municipal Court Judge Phyllis Frye was the first openly transgender judge of any type in the United States.)

== Early life and education ==
Kolakowski is the daughter of Martin and June Kolakowski of Staten Island, New York. She is a graduate of Stuyvesant High School in New York City and the first person in her family to attend college. Kolakowski graduated from New College of Florida in Sarasota, Florida with a Bachelor of Arts degree in Natural Sciences in 1982.

She earned a Master of Science degree in Biomedical Engineering from Tulane University in 1987 and a Master of Science degree in Electrical Engineering from University of New Orleans in 1990.

Kolakowski graduated from the Paul M. Hebert Law Center in Baton Rouge, Louisiana with a juris doctor in 1989. She began her transition during her last semester of law school. Kolakowski underwent gender affirmation surgery in 1992 (this has previously been misreported as 1991). Kolakowski had to sue to take the bar exam in Louisiana after coming out as transgender.

In 1997, Kolakowski received a Master of Divinity (M.Div.) degree from the Pacific School of Religion in Berkeley, California.

== Career ==
Before she was elected with 51% of the vote to her opponent's 48% on November 2, 2010, Kolakowski served as an administrative law judge with the California Public Utilities Commission for four years.

She was co-chair of the Bay Area Transgender Law Association from 1996 to 2000. She has been a member of the National Association of Women Judges since 2006.

Kolakowski was president of the International Association of LGBT Judges from 2015–2017, and the first transgender person to serve as president of the organization.

Kolakowski is a Christian and a retired ordained minister in the Universal Fellowship of Metropolitan Community Churches, a Protestant Christian denomination.

== Honors and awards ==
- Stonewall Award by the American Bar Association - February 2025
- Equality and Justice Award by Equality California in 2011
- Susan B. Anthony Award by the National Women's Political Caucus - Alameda North in 2011
- Unity Award by the Minority Bar Coalition in 2010
- Outstanding Woman of Berkeley by City of Berkeley, Commission on the Status of Women in 1995
- Woman of the Year by the East Bay Lesbian/Gay Democratic Club in 1994 (Kolakowski was president of the East Bay Lesbian/Gay Democratic Club)
- Named an individual community grand marshal for San Francisco Lesbian Gay Bisexual Transgender Pride in June 2011
- Named in October 2011 by Equality Forum as one of their 31 Icons of the LGBT History Month.

== Personal life ==
Kolakowski married Cynthia Laird, news editor of the Bay Area Reporter, on June 16, 2008. Ron Dellums performed the ceremony.

== See also ==
- List of first women lawyers and judges in California
- List of LGBT jurists in the United States
- List of transgender public officeholders in the United States
