= Lucy Hicks Anderson =

African-American transgender woman

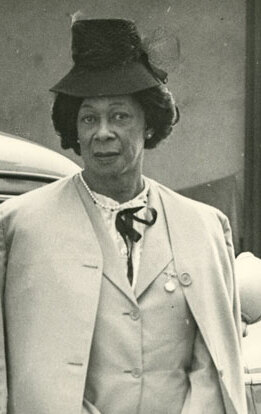
- Anderson, c. 1954
- Born: January 9, 1886; Waddy, Kentucky, U.S.
- Died: September 23, 1954 (aged 68); Los Angeles, California, U.S.
- Occupations: Socialite, chef, hostess, philanthropist
- Spouses: Clarence Hicks (m. 1920; div. 1929) Reuben Anderson (m. 1944)

Lucy Hicks Anderson (née Lawson; 1886–1954) was an American socialite, chef, hostess, and philanthropist, best known for her time in Oxnard, California, from 1920 to 1946.

Assigned male at birth, she was adamant from an early age that she was a girl. Her parents, based on advice from doctors, supported her decision to live as one. She later established a boarding house in Oxnard, where she became a popular hostess. In 1945, a year after she married her second husband, she was arrested, tried and convicted of perjury, as the government said she had lied about her sex on her marriage license. After her release from prison, she and her husband moved to Los Angeles.

== Early life ==
Lucy Lawson was born in Waddy, Kentucky, on January 9, 1886, as the child of William and Nancy Lawson née Lawson. From a very early age, Anderson identified as female in a time period before the term transgender existed, and naming herself Lucy. Doctors told Anderson's parents to let her live as a young woman, so they did, and she began wearing dresses to school and being known as Lucy.

== Marriages and time in Oxnard ==
At the age of 15, Anderson left school and did domestic work as a means to support herself. At age 20, she headed west to Pecos, Texas, where she worked in a hotel, and then to New Mexico, where she married her first husband Clarence Hicks in Silver City, New Mexico, in 1920. She later moved to Oxnard, California, at the age of 34. A skilled chef, she won some baking contests. Her marriage to Clarence lasted nine years, but during the course of the union, she saved enough money to buy property that was a boarding house front for a brothel; it also sold illegal liquor during the prohibition era.

Outside of her time as a madam, she was a well-known socialite and hostess in Oxnard, and she later used her connections to avoid serious jail time. Scholar C. Riley Snorton stated "When the sheriff arrested her one night, her double-barreled reputation paid off—Charles Donlon, the town's leading banker, promptly bailed her out [because] he had scheduled a huge dinner party which would have collapsed dismally with Lucy in jail."

In 1944, Hicks married Reuben Anderson, a soldier stationed in Long Island, New York.

== Trials ==
In 1945, a sailor claimed that he caught a venereal disease from one of the women in Anderson's brothel, so all of the women, including Anderson, were required to undergo medical examination. When the Ventura County district attorney learned from this examination that Anderson was transgender, he tried her for perjury because she lied about her assigned sex on her marriage license and impersonated a woman.

After being published in a small Pacific Coast paper, the story became widely publicized through a Time magazine article on November 5, 1945, where Anderson was exposed as a transgender woman. In a later letter from the publisher on January 14, 1946, it is explained that Time subscribers even nominated Anderson for Time's "Man of the Year" as a way of criticizing her transgender identity.

During her perjury trial, she stated "I defy any doctor in the world to prove that I am not a woman," and "I have lived, dressed, acted just what I am, a woman." However, the court convicted her of perjury on her marriage license and sentenced her to 10 years of probation. At the time, marriage in the United States was only considered legally valid if between a man and a woman, and as Anderson was considered a man, the marriage was declared invalid. As a result, the federal government charged her with fraud for receiving the financial allotments wives of soldiers got under the G.I. Bill, and initially also with failing to register for the draft, until she proved she had been too old to register. In this trial, she and Reuben were found guilty and sentenced to a men's prison, where Anderson was forbidden by court order to wear women's clothes.

== Death and legacy ==
After being released from prison, Anderson was barred from returning to Oxnard by the police chief, who threatened further prosecution. She and Reuben relocated to Los Angeles, where they resided quietly until her death in 1954, at 68.

The Handbook of LGBT Elders calls Anderson "one of the earliest documented cases of an African-American transgender person".

One episode of the HBO TV series Equal is based on the life of Anderson.

== See also ==
- African-American LGBT community
- Transgender rights in the United States
- History of transgender people in the United States
