= Transgender Archive =

The Transgender Archive began as the personal collection of Cristan Williams, and was donated to the Transgender Foundation of America in 2008 where the collection has continued to grow even today. The archive has grown to encompass museum quality artifacts and ephemera, recording hundreds of years of transgender history throughout the world. The Transgender History Archive is housed in the TG Center in Houston and is open to the public. The archive is one of many organisations thanked by influential LGBTQ+ writer, Leslie Feinberg.
