= Transgender Foundation of America =

Texas nonprofit organization

Transgender Foundation of America (TFA) is a Houston, Texas-based non-profit organization whose mission is to advance the quality of life for transgender people. TFA engages in community development through education and outreach resources. Additionally, TFA runs a Transgender Archive and museum space called the Transgender Archives. In addition to the Transgender Archive, the TFA Transgender Center provides the transgender community with several support groups and access to therapist support, medical assistance as well as social services such as homelessness prevention, case management and HIV prevention services. July 25 was named "Transgender Center Day" in Houston by Mayor Bill White.
