= North American Gay Amateur Athletic Alliance =

Non-profit organization

The North American Gay Amateur Athletic Alliance (NAGAAA) is a non-profit, international association of LGBTQ+ softball leagues. NAGAAA rebranded and is doing business as International Pride Softball (iPride Softball) as of 2023.

NAGAAA was founded in 1977 with five member cities, including Los Angeles, Milwaukee, New York, San Francisco, and Toronto. The first elected Commissioner was Warren Shepell, from Toronto, Ontario, Canada. As of 2026, iPride Softball has 58 member leagues in the United States and Canada, representing over 20,000 athletes on over 1,000 teams.

iPride Softball recognizes seven divisions of play, from the competitive A division through B, C, D and E, plus two Legends Divisions for players age 50 and above. A player rating system is used to evaluate player skill levels to ensure safety and competitive play. While each member city operates independently, membership allows for a consistent framework for operating interleague play during numerous tournaments hosted by member cities and at the two annual iPride Softball hosted tournaments, the Gay Softball World Series (GSWS) for all divisions, and the iPride Cup tournament for teams from A and B divisions and the two Legends divisions. The GSWS is the largest annual, LGBTQ, "single-sport, week-long athletic competition in the world."

Prior to 2007, there was also a division for all female teams but the Amateur Sports Alliance of North America was formed from NAGAAA in 2007.

== Current member leagues ==
- Atlanta: Hotlanta Softball
- Austin: Softball Austin
- Birmingham: New South Softball League
- Boston: Beantown Softball League
- Charlotte: Carolina Piedmont Softball League
- Chicago: Chicago Metropolitan Sports Association
- Cincinnati: River City Softball League
- Columbus: Columbus Lesbian & Gay Softball Association
- Dallas: Pegasus Slowpitch Softball Association
- Denver: Denver Area Softball League
- Des Moines: Pride Sports League of Central Iowa
- Detroit: Metro Detroit Softball League
- Fort Lauderdale: South Florida Amateur Athletic Association
- Greensboro: Camel City Softball
- Hamilton: Steel City Inclusive Softball
- Honolulu: Aloha State Softball League
- Houston: Montrose Softball League
- Huntsville: NexUs Softball League
- Indianapolis: Stonewall Sports Indianapolis
- Iowa City: Lambda Softball Association
- Kansas City: Heart of America Softball League
- Knoxville: K-Town Softball League
- Las Vegas: Las Vegas Gay Softball League
- Long Beach: Long Beach/Orange County Surf & Sun Softball Association
- Los Angeles: The Greater Los Angeles Softball Association (GLASA)
- Louisville: Derby City Pride League
- Madison: Badgerland Softball League
- Memphis: Bluff City Sports Association
- Mid-Atlantic (Norfolk/Richmond): Mid-Atlantic Softball Association
- Milwaukee: Saturday Softball Beer League
- Nashville: Metro Nashville Softball Association
- New Orleans: NOLA Softball League
- New York City: Big Apple Softball League
- Oklahoma City: Sooner State Softball Alliance of OKC
- Orlando: Central Florida Softball League
- Palm Springs: Palm Springs Gay Softball League
- Philadelphia: City of Brotherly Love Softball League
- Phoenix: Cactus Cities Softball League
- Pittsburgh: Steel City Softball League
- Portland: Rose City Softball Association
- Providence, Rhode Island: Renaissance City Softball League
- Raleigh: Oak City Softball League
- Sacramento: Sacramento Valley Gay and Lesbian Softball
- San Antonio: San Antonio Gay Softball League
- San Diego: America's Finest City Softball League
- San Francisco: San Francisco Gay Softball League
- San Jose: Silicon Valley Softball League
- Seattle: Emerald City Softball Association
- Sioux Falls: Sioux Empire Pride Sports Association
- Southern New England (Connecticut): Southern New England Friendship League
- St. Louis: St. Louis Gay and Lesbian Association of Summer Softball
- Tampa: Suncoast Softball League
- Toronto: Cabbagetown Group Softball League
- Tucson: Tucson Inferno Pride Softball
- Tulsa: Tulsa Metro Softball League
- Twin Cities (Minneapolis/St. Paul): Twin Cities Goodtime Softball League
- Vancouver: West End SloPitch Association
- Washington, D.C.: Chesapeake and Potomac Softball League

== Gay Softball World Series ==
Annually, teams representing these leagues participate in the Gay Softball World Series (GSWS), which hosted each year in a different member city.

Each member city is allowed to send: (1) an unlimited number of teams in the A and B divisions; (2) up to three team in each of the C, D and E divisions based on the size of the local league, with larger leagues allowed more teams than smaller leagues; and (3) up to two teams in each of the Legends C and Legends D divisions. Members cities are encouraged (before change in 2024, each league when was required) to send at least one team to the GSWS each year.

Future sites for the Gay Softball World Series
2026 - Columbus, Ohio
2027 - San Francisco, California (50th GSWS)

=== Gay Softball World Series Champions ===
| Year | Host city | Total Teams | A Division Winner | B Division Winner | C Division Winner | D Division Winner | E Division Winner | Legends Division C Winner | Legends Division D Winner |
|---|---|---|---|---|---|---|---|---|---|
| 2027 | San Francisco, CA | | | | | | | | |
| 2026 | Columbus, OH | 267 30 | | | | | | | Las Vegas Old Bats |
| 2025 | Houston, TX | | Phoenix; Charlie's AZ Toros | Knoxville; Primetime Elite | Oklahoma City; BP | Fort Lauderdale; Whoosh | San Antonio; Plastics | Orlando; SWAG | Dallas; Boom |
| 2024 | Las Vegas, NV | | Phoenix; Charlie's AZ Toros | Seattle; Cascades | Atlanta; Aces | St. Louis; River Rats | Houston; Cub-ees | San Francisco; Hearts of Fury | Ft. Lauderdale; Silverhawks |
| 2023 | Twin Cities, MN | 225 | San Francisco; Fury Unleashed | San Francisco; Sharks | Columbus; Pandas | Ft. Lauderdale; Riptide | Orlando; Liberty Baggers | Palm Springs; Greyhounds | Atlanta; Daddies |
| 2022 | Dallas, TX | 250 | Phoenix; Charlie's AZ Toros | Atlanta; Primetime Elite | Orlando; Liberty | Dallas; Green Sox | Birmingham; Sliders | Orlando; Swag | Washington DC; Big Blue |
| 2021 | Columbus, OH | 235 | Phoenix; Charlie's AZ Toros | Columbus; Grizz | New Orleans; Skittles United | Columbus; Capitals | Columbus; The Columbus Ban'd | Palm Springs; Grayhounds | Orlando; Swag Sportswear |
| 2020 | Cancelled | | | | | | | | |
| 2019 | Kansas City, MO | 207 | Phoenix; Charlies | Los Angeles; Rebels | Atlanta; Wet Demons | Dallas; Devils | Atlanta; Chargers | Ft. Lauderdale; Alive & Kicking | Ft. Lauderdale; Silverhawks |
| 2018 | Tampa, FL * | 194 | Orlando; Unicorns | Knoxville; Cyclones / Orlando; Voltage | Mid-Atlantic; Thunder | Mid-Atlantic; Norfolk Gunners | | Houston; Hey Daddy! | Palm Springs; Desert Dogs / Philadelphia; Triple Play Legends |
| 2017 | Portland, OR | | Palm Springs; Rounders 2.0 | Austin; Hot Flash | Twin Cities; Steel | Long Beach; Pegasus D | | Dallas; Fossil Fuel | Ft. Lauderdale; Code Blue |
| 2016 | Austin, TX | 187 | Dallas; Texas Force | Los Angeles; Thunder | Kansas City; Cocktails | Phoenix; Saints | | New York; Cranky Yankees | |
| 2015 | Columbus, OH | 185 | Houston; Force | Columbus; Grizzlies | Austin; Outlaws | Tampa; Pitch Slapped | | San Diego; Marine Layer | |
| 2014 | Dallas, TX | 168 | Palm Springs; Rounders 2.0 | Atlanta; Show Stoppers | Las Vegas; Grease Monkeys | Los Angeles; Swingers | | New York; Cranky Yankees | |
| 2013 | Washington, DC | 157 | Houston; Force | Boston; Blizzard | Orlando; Fury Unleashed | Mid-Atlantic; Lightning | | Southern New England; Cranky Yankees | |
| 2012 | Twin Cities, MN | 153 | Atlanta; Sluggers | Long Beach; Rounders 2.0 | Tampa; Venom | Seattle; Inferno | | Seattle; Strokes | |
| 2011 | Chicago, IL | 150 | Atlanta; Venom | Boston; Alley Gators | Las Vegas; The Rat Pack | Boston; Good Times | | Chicago; Side Track Classics | |
| 2010 | Columbus, OH * | 146 | Los Angeles; Vipers / Orlando; Force | Dallas; T K O | Austin; Shady Ladies | Boston; Ramrod Machine | | | |
| 2009 | Milwaukee, WI | 127 | Phoenix; Toros | Chicago; Spin Cougars | Ft. Lauderdale; Cyclones | Nashville; Players | | | |
| 2008 | Seattle, WA | | Los Angeles; Vipers | Boston; Crew | Dallas; Woody's Xplosion | Seattle; Atomic | | | |
| 2007 | Phoenix, AZ | | Atlanta; Venom | Orlando; Force | Memphis; Heat | Atlanta; Wet Demons | | | |
| 2006 | Ft. Lauderdale, FL | | Los Angeles; Vipers | Los Angeles; Killer B's | Nashville; Tribe | Chicago; Jackhammer Heat | | | |
| 2005 | San Diego, CA | | Los Angeles; Vipers | Washington D.C. Disturbance | Seattle; Blue Sox | Tampa; Titans | | | |
| 2004 | Dallas, TX | | Atlanta; Venom | Phoenix; Calamus/IONSZ Crush | Virginia Beach; Evil Empire | Memphis; Barflies | | | |
| 2003 | Washington, DC | | Los Angeles; Stray Cats | Seattle; Monarchs | Chicago; Cougar's | Los Angeles; El Dorado Knights | | | |
| 2002 | Portland, OR | 76 | Los Angeles; Stray Cats | Ft. Lauderdale; Alibi Demons | Mid-Atlantic; Norfolk Cavaliers | Chicago; Little Dog Properties | | | |
| 2001 | San Francisco, CA | | Los Angeles; Stray Cats | Los Angeles; Destroyers | Ft. Lauderdale; Chardees Stingrays | | | | |
| 2000 | Toronto, ON | | Los Angeles; Stray Cats | Boston; Jackhammers | Ft. Lauderdale; Chardees Stingrays | | | | |
| 1999 | Kansas City, MO | | Los Angeles; Stray Cats | Kansas City; Dixie Belles Sharps | San Francisco; Posse | | | | |
| 1998 | Atlanta, GA | | Los Angeles; Stray Cats | Dallas; Sting | Boston; Southenders | | | | |
| 1997 | San Diego, CA | | Los Angeles; Stray Cats | Twin Cities; Gay 90's Bandits | Toronto; The Crew | | | | |
| 1996 | Twin Cities, MN | | Los Angeles; Stray Cats | New York; Sunny Day Knights | San Francisco; Murderer's Row | | | | |
| 1995 | Seattle, WA | | Los Angeles; Stray Cats | San Diego; Rich's ACES | Washington D.C. JR's Gamecocks | | | | |
| 1994 | Nashville, TN | | Los Angeles; Stray Cats | New York; Dugout | Dallas; JR's | | | | |
| 1993 | Philadelphia, PA | 75 | Mid-Atlantic; Norfolk Outlaws | Seattle; Elite | San Francisco; Aids Foundation Golden Bears | | | | |
| 1992 | Los Angeles, CA | | Boston; Fritz | Philadelphia; Woody's | Atlanta; Ritz Sluggers | | | | |
| 1991 | Boston, MA | | Los Angeles; Griffs | Los Angeles; Blaze | | | | | |
| 1990 | Pittsburgh, PA | | San Francisco; Uncle Bert's Bombers | Philadelphia; Blue Parrot | | | | | |
| 1989 | Atlanta, GA | | Los Angeles; Griffs | San Francisco; Galleon | | | | | |
| 1988 | Dallas, TX | | Twin Cities; Cloud 9 | New York; Ty's Chelsea Breakers | | | | | |
| 1987 | San Francisco, CA | | Twin Cities; Cloud 9 | | | | | | |
| 1986 | New York, NY/New Haven, CT | | Los Angeles; Slammers | | | | | | |
| 1985 | Milwaukee, WI | | Houston; Briar Patch | | | | | | |
| 1984 | Houston, TX | 18 | Twin Cities; Gay 90's | | | | | | |
| 1983 | Chicago, IL | 14 | Chicago; Sidetrack | | | | | | |
| 1982 | San Francisco, CA | | San Francisco; Pendulum | | | | | | |
| 1981 | Toronto, ON | 11 | Los Angeles; Griffs | | | | | | |
| 1980 | Los Angeles, CA | | Los Angeles; Griffs | | | | | | |
| 1979 | Milwaukee, WI | 9 | Los Angeles; Rusty Nail | | | | | | |
| 1978 | New York, NY | 4 | Los Angeles; Griffs | | | | | | |
| 1977 | San Francisco, CA | 2 | San Francisco; Badland | | | | | | |

- Co-Champions have been declared in 2010 and 2018 for some divisions due to inclement weather.

== See also ==
- LGBT community
