= Phyllis Frye =

American lawyer (born 1948)

Phyllis Randolph Frye
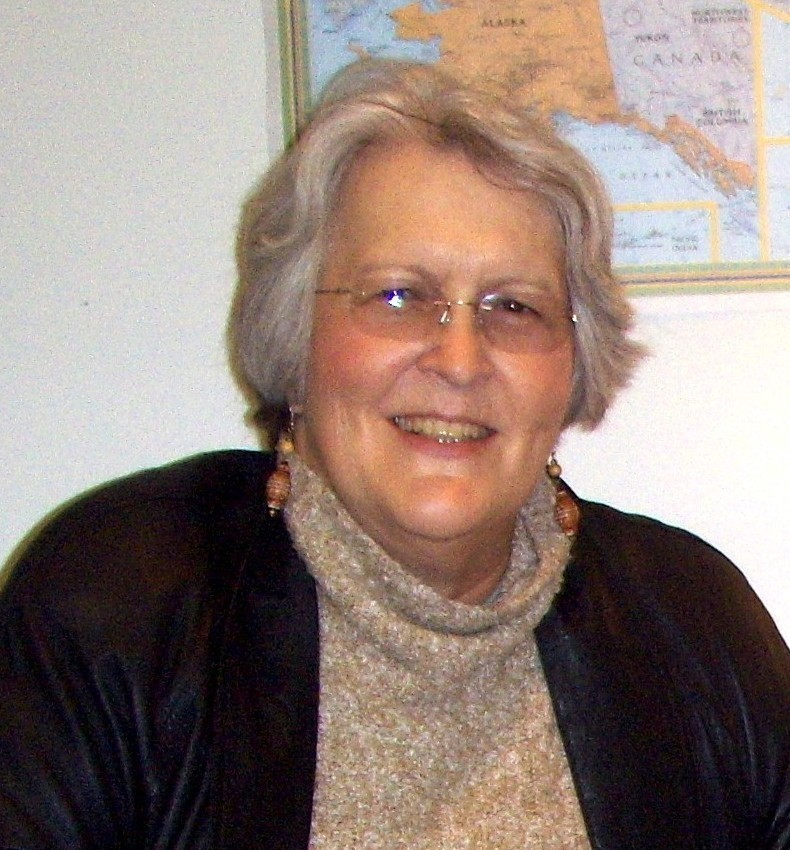
- Frye in 2006

Associate Judge for the City of Houston Municipal Courts
- In office November 17, 2010 – January 2023
- Appointed by: Annise Parker

Personal details
- Born: 1948 (age 77–78) San Antonio, Texas, US
- Spouse: Patricia "Trish" Dooley (m. 1973; died 2020)
- Education: Texas A&M University (BS, MS); University of Houston (JD, MBA)
- Military career
- Branch: United States Army
- Rank: First lieutenant

Phyllis Randolph Frye (born 1948) is an associate judge for the municipal courts in Houston, Texas. Frye is the first openly transgender judge appointed in the United States.

== Biography ==
Phyllis Frye was born in 1948 in San Antonio, Texas, and was the second of three children. Her father was an engineer, and her mother was a homemaker.

In her younger years, she earned the rank of Eagle Scout, and was a member of the Junior Reserve Officers' Training Corps. Frye attended Texas A&M University, where she graduated with a B.S. in civil engineering and an M.S. in mechanical engineering. While at Texas A&M, Frye was a member of the university's Corps of Cadets and belonged to the Texas A&M Singing Cadets.

Frye joined the United States Army, and post-graduation at Texas A&M, she was stationed in West Germany, achieving the rank of First lieutenant. Frye disclosed her struggles with her sexual identity to her Army superiors, and they sent her back to the United States in an effort to "cure" her. These efforts included drug therapy, hypnosis, and aversion therapy. When these attempts all failed, her first wife filed for divorce and took custody of their son. Frye was honorably discharged from the Army in 1972 after being forced to resign.

After her discharge, she hit a low point in her life and attempted suicide. After her suicide attempt, she began working as a civil engineer, and became a born-again Christian. In the fall of 1972, she met her second wife, a music teacher named Patricia "Trish" Dooley, and the two married in June 1973. She transitioned in 1976 around the age of 30, electing some medical procedures and foregoing others. Around this time, she won the right to amend her birth certificate.

Frye held several engineering jobs, including at her alma mater, Texas A&M University, but was repeatedly dismissed from jobs after they learned of her gender identity. She and her wife moved to Pennsylvania for a short time and she found a new job. In 1977, she was rejected from a government job due to her "disruptive influence in her community."

Fry earned an M.B.A. and J.D. from the University of Houston. She found herself isolated, so she requested seating charts for all her classes and memorized her classmates' names and approached them individually. During her time at the University of Houston, she joined the Christian Legal Society but eventually got the group suspended for discrimination because they were secretly meeting to avoid letting her be involved. While at law school, she underwent feminizing hormone therapy and electrolysis, both of which led to substantial physical changes.

After graduation, Frye could not find a firm that would hire her, so she sold Amway cleaning products and worked sporadically as an engineering consultant. She took an interest in criminal defense and became a recognizable fixture in the Harris County Courthouse representing indigent defendants as a court-appointed attorney. Frye later became the country's first openly transgender judge in 2010, though she also experienced discrimination against her for this in both the private and public spheres, ranging from people vandalizing her house to refusing her jobs.

Frye politically aligns as a Democrat and was active with the state Democrats, the League of Women Voters, and the local gay and lesbian caucus, where she developed a working relationship with Annise Parker. Parker and Frye had been friends for three decades, having met on a lesbian softball league. Frye became the first transgender woman in Houston's lesbian softball league.

Her spouse, Trish, died on September 28, 2020, from complications of brain cancer.

== Career ==
Frye became a lawyer in 1981 and began taking cases to assist LGBTQ people in need of a lawyer. Later, she founded the International Conference on Transgender Law and Employment Policy in 1992, which lasted until 1997. It was organized on the chat platform she founded called The Gazebo.

Frye presented at her first Creating Change conference (trans and bisexual caucuses combined meeting) in 1995. That same year, a dispute arose over the version of the Employment Non-Discrimination Act (ENDA) proposed in the 104th Congress (1995–1996), which did not include protection for transgender people. The Human Rights Campaign (HRC), an LGBT advocacy group, drew particular criticism for its endorsement of the Act, which was seen as a betrayal by many in the transgender community. In February 1997, Frye organized a gathering of transgender people in Washington, D.C., where 20 people came to the offices of 46 senators of the 49 who voted for ENDA in 1996 to discuss the vote and advocate for expanding the protections to include the transgender community.

By the 2000s, Frye was representing more and more transgender clients in name-change and discrimination cases. On November 17, 2010, Houston mayor Annise Parker appointed Frye as an associate judge for the City of Houston Municipal Courts. Her appointment was publicly opposed by the Houston Area Pastors Council and other local pastors, but Parker expressed admiration for Frye, citing the new judge's long experience as a trial attorney. The Houston City Council unanimously approved her appointment. She retired from the bench in January 2023.

On April 28, 2013, Frye was presented with the Lifetime Achievement Award by the Transgender Foundation of America.

== See also ==
- List of first women lawyers and judges in the United States
- List of LGBT jurists in the United States
