= Emily Skidmore =

American associate professor and researcher

Emily Skidmore is an associate professor, a researcher and the author of True Sex. She is currently a history professor at Texas Tech University where she is also the director of graduate studies.

== Biography ==
For her award-winning book True Sex: The Lives of Trans Men at the Turn of the Twentieth Century, Skidmore gathered historical evidence of trans men in the United States from the 1876 to 1936 using newspapers and census and court documents. Some of the trans men documented included Joseph Lobdell and Ralph Kerwineo. Rorotoko featured Skidmore and her book in a cover interview discussing her discovery of historical records of trans men in rural areas. True Sex marks a historical deviation from the normative argument of that queer folks generally move to cities. Skidmore argues that the history of queer America may look different than the stories that currently predominate. She has been extensively quoted in the works of others such as Kritika Agarwal's 2018 article in Perspectives on trans history. The book has been extensively reviewed with commentary supporting the possibility of reframing the history of queer people in the United States.

Skidmore's works center on LGBTQ2+ issues, with a focus of transgender history. Some of Skidmore's works have an intersectional approach and she has had twelve articles been published in ten journals. Skidmore's work has been included in A Companion to American Women's History and her historical perspective has also been interviewed and quoted regarding the origins of the American women's suffrage movement. She has contributed to the creation of the Global Encyclopedia of Lesbian, Gay, Bisexual, Transgender, and Queer (LGBTQ) History, as an editor.

Skidmore's 2004 B.A. from Macalester College and 2011 Ph.D. from University of Illinois were both in history. She is currently an associate professor in history at the Texas Tech University.

Skidmore has been featured in podcasts with Marshall Poe in 2019 and Backstory.

== Works ==
=== Books ===
- Author, True Sex: The Lives of Trans Men at the Turn of the Twentieth Century ISBN 9781479870639
- Editor, Global Encyclopedia of Lesbian, Gay, Bisexual, Transgender, and Queer (LGBTQ) History, 1st Edition ISBN 9780684325545

=== Selected articles ===
- Skidmore, E. (2011). Constructing the "Good Transsexual": Christine Jorgensen, Whiteness, and Heteronormativity in the Mid-Twentieth-Century Press. Feminist Studies, 37(2), 270–300.
- Skidmore, E (2011). Exceptional queerness: defining the boundaries of normative U.S. citizenship, 1876-1936 (Thesis). University of Illinois at Urbana-Champaign.

=== Online works ===
- Troubling Terms: The Label Problem in Transgender History, Notches, November 28, 2017.
- Life as a Trans Man in Turn-of-the-Century America, Literary Hub, September 22, 2017.

== Awards ==
- 2019, President's Faculty Book Award from Texas Tech University
- 2018, U.S. History PROSE Award winner for True Sex: The Lives of Trans Men at the Turn of the Twentieth Century.
- 2018, Outstanding Teaching award from the History Graduate Student Association at Texas Tech University.
- 2016, Audre Lorde prize winner for her article Ralph Kerwineo’s Queer Body: Narrating the Scales of Social Membership in the Early Twentieth Century.
