= Transgender history =

Accounts of transgender people (including non-binary and third gender people) have been identified in cultures worldwide as early as 1200 BCE in Egypt. Opinions vary on how to categorize historical accounts of gender-variant people and identities.

The galli, eunuch priests of classical antiquity, have been interpreted by some scholars as transgender or third-gender. The trans-feminine kathoey and hijra gender roles have persisted for thousands of years in Thailand and the Indian subcontinent, respectively. In Arabia, khanith (like earlier mukhannathun) have occupied a third gender role attested since the 7th century CE. Traditional roles for transgender women and transgender men have existed in many African societies, with some persisting to the modern day. North American Indigenous fluid and third gender roles, including the Navajo nádleehi and the Zuni lhamana, have existed since pre-colonial times.

Some medieval European documents have been studied as possible accounts of transgender persons. Kalonymus ben Kalonymus's lament for being born a man instead of a woman has been seen as an early account of gender dysphoria. John/Eleanor Rykener, a male-bodied Briton arrested in 1394 while living and doing sex work dressed as a woman, has been interpreted by some contemporary scholars as transgender. In Japan, accounts of transgender people go back to the Edo period. In Indonesia, there are millions of trans-/third-gender waria, and the extant pre-Islamic Bugis society of Sulawesi recognizes five gender roles.

In the United States in 1776, the genderless Public Universal Friend refused both birth name and gendered pronouns. Transgender American men and women are documented in accounts from throughout the 19th century. The first known informal transgender advocacy organisation in the United States, Cercle Hermaphroditos, was founded in 1895.

Early modern gender-affirming surgeries, including an ovary and uterus transplant, were performed in the early 20th century at the Institut für Sexualwissenschaft in Germany, which was later raided and destroyed by Nazi Germany. The respective transitions of transgender women Christine Jorgensen and Coccinelle in the 1950s brought wider awareness of gender-affirming surgery to North America and Europe, respectively. The grassroots political struggle for transgender rights in the United States produced several riots against police, including the 1959 Cooper Donuts Riot, 1966 Compton's Cafeteria Riot, and the multi-day Stonewall Riots of 1969. In the 1970s, Lou Sullivan became the first publicly self-identified gay trans man and founded the first organization for transgender men. At the same time, some radical feminists opposed definitions of womanhood that included transgender women, giving rise to what would later be termed trans-exclusionary radical feminism. In the 1990s and 2000s, the Transgender Day of Remembrance was established in the United States, and transgender politicians were elected to various public offices. Legislative and court actions began recognizing transgender people's rights in some countries, while some countries and societies have continued to abridge the rights of transgender people.

== Historiography ==
A precise history of the global occurrence of transgender people is difficult to compose because the modern concept of being transgender, and of gender in general as relevant to transgender identity, did not develop until the mid-20th century. Historical understandings are thus inherently filtered through modern principles, and were largely viewed through a medical lens until the late 20th century. LGBTQ+ scholar Genny Beemyn writes:

Can there be said to be a "transgender history," when "transgender" is a contemporary term and when individuals in past centuries who would perhaps appear to be transgender from our vantage point might not have conceptualized their lives in such a way? And what about individuals today who have the ability to describe themselves as transgender, but choose not to for a variety of reasons, including the perception that it is a White, middle-class Western term and the belief that it implies transitioning from one gender to another? Should they be left out of "transgender history" because they do not specifically identify as transgender?

Genny Beemyn argues that transgender history has also been filtered through gay history, identifying Billy Tipton as an example of a historical figure misrepresented by scholars as gay when a transgender reading of his life would be more appropriate.

The absence of autobiographical accounts has led historians to assign identities to historical figures, which, of course, may be inaccurate. Author Jason Cromwell assesses that if a person of the female sex indicated that they were a man, modified their body to look more traditionally male, and lived their life as a man, then he was a trans man; the same approach has been used to identify trans women. Genny Beemyn distinguishes trans people from crossdressers in the historical record by assessing that a person who crossdressed only in public did not mind exposing their dual life as a crossdresser, while those who crossdressed consistently (also in private) and sought to keep their sex a secret were more likely trans.

Beemyn also distinguishes non-binary people in the historical record. They note Indigenous societies in the "New World" that historically had non-binary gender roles enshrined in their society, which enraged European explorers. For example, in 1513, Vasco Núñez de Balboa killed 40 natives on the Panama Isthmus for being sodomites, as they had been assigned male at birth but were practicing female gender roles. Not all Europeans were as judgmental: a matter-of-fact 1564 narrative describes "hermaphrodites" as "quite common". An account from Edwin Thompson Denig in the first half of the 19th century describes a "neuter" gender among the Crow people. Denig said of it: "Strange country this, where males assume the dress and perform the duties of females, while women turn men and mate with their own sex!" Beemyn concludes that European writers lacked the language or cultural understanding to describe the practices they were witnessing adequately. Overall, they caution not to make generalizations about native practices, since third gender roles were extremely diverse and ranged from exalted positions who were believed to have supernatural power, to denigrated underlings.

== Africa ==
=== Ancient Egypt ===
Ancient Egypt had third-gender categories, including eunuchs. In the Tale of Two Brothers (from 3,200 years ago), Bata removes his penis and tells his wife "I am a woman just like you"; one modern scholar called him temporarily (before his body is restored) "transgendered".

The pharaoh Hatshepsut apparently changed her gender to some degree out of political necessity, to fit into ancient Egypt's patriarchal society. As her role strengthened from regent to god, depictions of her became more masculine, in line with the conventions of Egyptian art and writing. Over time, they transitioned from yellow to red, from stationary to mobile, and gradually replaced feminine clothing and body attributes with masculine ones. Later inscriptions mixed male and female pronouns, describing a female king rather than a queen.

=== North Africa ===
The Nuba peoples of Sudan (including the Otoro Nuba, Nyima, Tira, Krongo, and Mesakin), have traditional roles for male-assigned people who dress and live as women and may marry men, which have been seen as transgender roles. Trans people face discrimination in the modern Sudanese state, where cross-dressing is illegal.

=== West Africa ===
By the modern period, the Igbo had third-gender and transgender roles, including for females who take on male status and marry women, a practice which also exists among the Dahomey (Fon) of Benin and has been viewed through both transgender and homosexual lenses. Anthropologist John McCall documented a female-assigned Ohafia Igbo named Nne Uko Uma Awa, who dressed and behaved as a boy since childhood, joined men's groups, and was a husband to two wives; in 1991, Awa stated "by creation I was meant to be a man. But as it happened, when coming into this world, I came with a woman's body. That is why I dressed [as a man]." Hausa culture in Nigeria has a phenomenon known as Yan Dauda, a term translated by some scholars as feminine men or third gender, and sometimes discussed in relation to transgender identities.

=== East Africa ===
Among some Kenyan peoples, male priests (called mugawe among the Meru and Kikuyu) dress and style their hair like women and may marry men, and have been compared to trans women.

Among the Nuer people (in what is now South Sudan and Ethiopia), widows who have borne no children may adopt a male status, marry a woman, and be regarded as the father of any children they bear (a practice which has been viewed as transgender or homosexual); the Nuer are also reported to have a male-to-female role. The Maale people of Ethiopia also have a traditional role for male-assigned ashtime who take on feminine roles; traditionally, they served as sexual partners for the king on days he was ritually barred from sex with women. The Amhara people of Ethiopia stigmatize men in their communities who adopt feminine dress.

In Uganda today, transphobia and homophobia is increasing, introduced in the 1800s and 1900s by Christian missionaries and stoked in the 2000s by conservative American evangelicals; trans people are now often kicked out by their families and denied work, and face discrimination in accessing healthcare. Before their Christianization, Ugandan peoples were largely accepting of trans and gay people; the Lango people accepted trans women—male-assigned people called jo apele or jo aboich who were believed to have been transformed at conception into women by the androgynous deity Jok, and who adopted women's names, dress, and face-decorations, grew their hair long, simulated menstruation, and could marry men—as did the Karamojong and Teso, and the Lugbara people had roles for both trans women (okule) and trans men (agule).

=== Southern Africa ===
==== Traditional Bantu third genders ====
Various Bantu peoples in southern Africa, including the Zulu, Basotho, Mpondo and Tsonga, had a tradition of young men (inkotshane in Zulu, boukonchana in Sesotho, tinkonkana in Mpondo, and nkhonsthana in Tsonga; called "boy-wives" in English) who married or had intercrural or anal sex with older men, and sometimes dressed as women, wore breast prostheses, did not grow beards, and did women's work; these relationships became common among South African miners and continued into the 1950s, and while often interpreted as homosexual, boy-wives are sometimes seen as transgender.

==== Botswana ====
In two cases in 2017, Botswana's High Court ruled trans men and trans women have the right to have their gender identity recognized by the government and to change gender markers; the court said the registrar's refusal to change a marker was unreasonable and violated the person's "rights to dignity, privacy, freedom of expression, equal protection of the law, freedom from discrimination and freedom from inhumane and degrading treatment".

==== South Africa ====
From the 1960s to 1980s, the South African Defence Force forced some white gay and lesbian soldiers to have sex reassignment surgery.

Since March 2004, trans and intersex people are allowed to change their legal sex after medical treatment such as hormone replacement therapy. Several Labour Court rulings have found against employers that mistreated employees who transitioned.

== Americas ==
=== North America ===
==== Early history ====
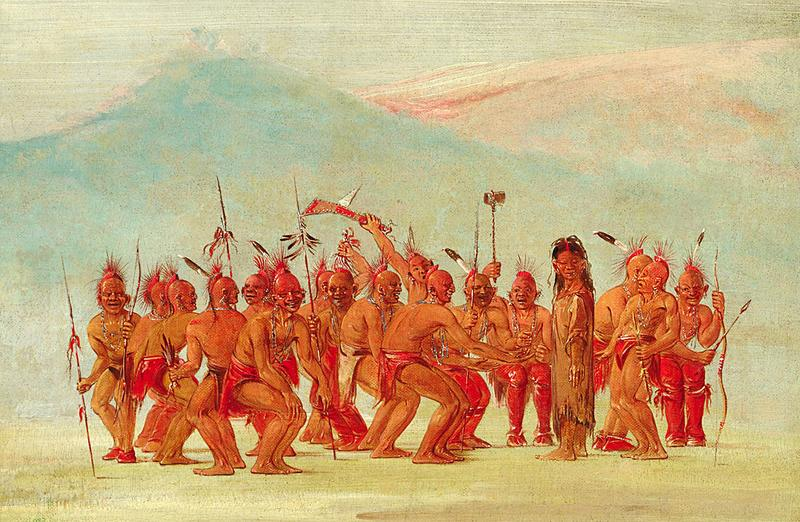
Sac and Fox warriors dance around an I-coo-coo-a person, a male-bodied person who lived in the social role usually filled by women in that culture. Non-native George Catlin (1796–1872) titled his painting, Dance to the Berdache; Smithsonian Institution, Washington, D.C.

Prior to western contact, some Indigenous peoples in North America had third-gender roles, like the Diné (Navajo) nádleehi and the Zuni lhamana. European anthropologists usually referred to these people as berdaches, which Indigenous people have always considered an offensive slur. In 1990, participants in the Third Annual Inter-tribal Native American, First Nations, Gay and Lesbian American Conference in Winnipeg, Canada, adopted the pan-Indian neologism two-spirit; this was largely an effort to replace the offensive slur, berdache, as well as an attempt to organize inter-tribally. Though acceptance of this term in traditional Native communities (which already have their own terms for such people in their own languages, if they have roles for them at all) has been limited, it has generally met with more acceptance than the slur it replaced.

One of the first European accounts of Iroquois practices of gender was made by missionary Joseph-François Lafitau, who spent six years among the Iroquois starting in 1711, and observed "women with manly courage who prided themselves upon the profession of warrior, [and seemed] to become men alone", and people he called "men cowardly enough to live as women."

Lynn Meskell and Karen Olsen Bruhns write that there is archaeological evidence that third-gender or similar people existed in California 2,500 years ago at rates comparable to those at which they currently exist among Indigenous peoples in the region, and Barbara Voss states that archaeological and ethnographic evidence suggests third-gender categories in North America may go back to the first migrations of people from eastern Asia and Siberia over 10,000 years ago.

==== Canada ====
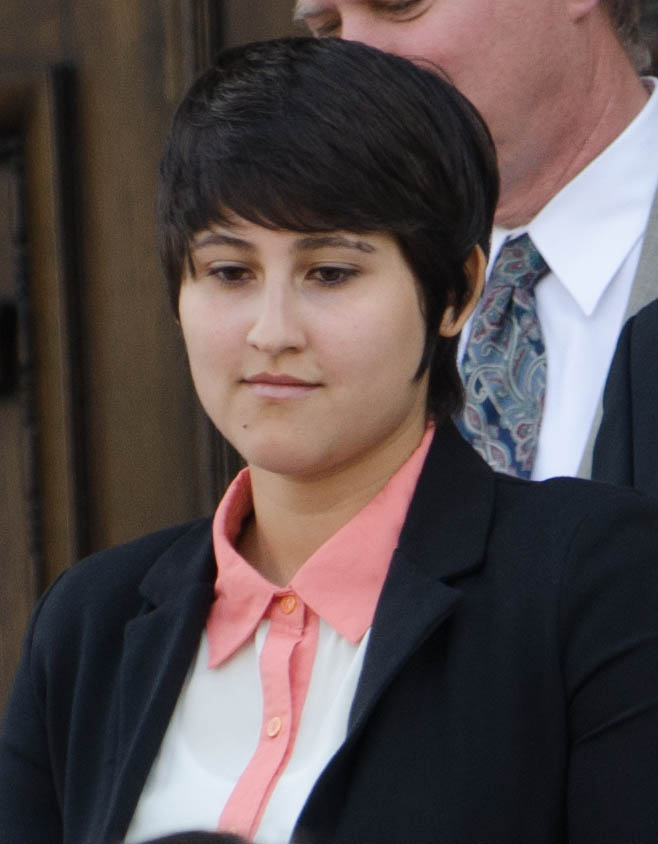
Estefan Cortes-Vargas, an Albertan legislator who announced in 2015 that they are non-binary

In 1970, Dianna Boileau underwent sex reassignment surgery at Toronto General Hospital, becoming possibly the first in Canada to do so. Over the following two years, Boileau shared her story with some press outlets and published a 1972 memoir, Behold, I Am a Woman, before retreating from the public eye.

In 2002, sexual orientation and gender identity were included in the Northwest Territories Human Rights Act.

In June 2012, gender identity and expression were added to the Ontario Human Rights Code, and gender identity was added to the Manitoba Human Rights Code. In December 2012 Nova Scotia added gender identity and expression to the list of things explicitly protected from harassment in that province's Human Rights Act. In May 2012, after a legal battle to reverse her disqualification for not being a "naturally born female", Vancouver resident Jenna Talackova became the first trans woman to compete in a Miss Universe pageant, and was one of four contestants to win "Miss Congeniality".

In March 2013, the House of Commons passed Bill C-279 to officially extend human rights protections to trans people in Canada. In February 2015, the Senate of Canada amended the bill in ways that were criticized as transphobic.

In December 2015, legislator Estefania Cortes-Vargas came out as non-binary in the Legislative Assembly of Alberta during a debate over the inclusion of transgender rights in the provincial human rights code. While the provincial Hansard normally reports members' speeches under the gender honorifics "Mr." or "Ms.", Cortes-Vargas is recorded as "Member Cortes-Vargas". On December 17, 2015, Kael McKenzie was appointed to the Provincial Court of Manitoba, becoming Canada's first openly transgender judge.

In 2016, gender identity or expression was added to the Quebec Charter of Rights and Freedoms. The same year, Jennifer Pritzker made a $2 million donation to establish the world's first endowed academic chair in transgender studies at the University of Victoria in British Columbia; Aaron Devor was appointed the inaugural chair. In May 2016, Bill C-16 was introduced aiming to update the Canadian Human Rights Act and Criminal Code to include gender identity and expression as protected grounds from discrimination, hate publication and advocacy of genocide, and to add targeting of victims on the basis of gender identity and expression to the list of aggravating factors in sentencing, the first time such a bill was put forward by the governing party in the House of Commons. Since June 2017, all places within Canada explicitly within the Canadian Human Rights Act or equal opportunity or anti-discrimination legislation prohibit discrimination against gender identity or expression.

Since August 2017, Canadians can indicate that they are neither male nor female on their passports, using an 'x' marker.

In January 2018, Canadian Women's Hockey League player Jessica Platt came out, becoming the first trans woman to do so in North American professional hockey.

==== Haiti ====
In 1791, early in the Haitian Revolution, a black planter who had been raised as a boy led an uprising in southern Haiti under the name Romaine-la-Prophétesse ("Romaine the Prophetess"). Romaine dressed like a woman and spoke of being possessed by a female spirit, may have been transgender or genderfluid, and has been compared to the transgender feminine religious figures of West Africa, the area many black Haitians descended from. Mary Grace Albanese and Hourya Bentouhami list Romaine among the women who led the Haitian Revolution, while Terry Rey argues that calling Romaine transgender could be anachronistic. Romaine has been compared to Kimpa Vita, who professed to be the incarnation of a male Catholic saint.

In the modern era, discrimination and violence against transgender people is common in Haitian society, though many LGBT people find it easier to be open about their gender within the Vodou subculture, in which it is believed, for example, that divinities of the opposite sex may possess people. Haiti's criminal code prohibits vagrancy, with a specific mention of transvestites.

==== Mexico ====
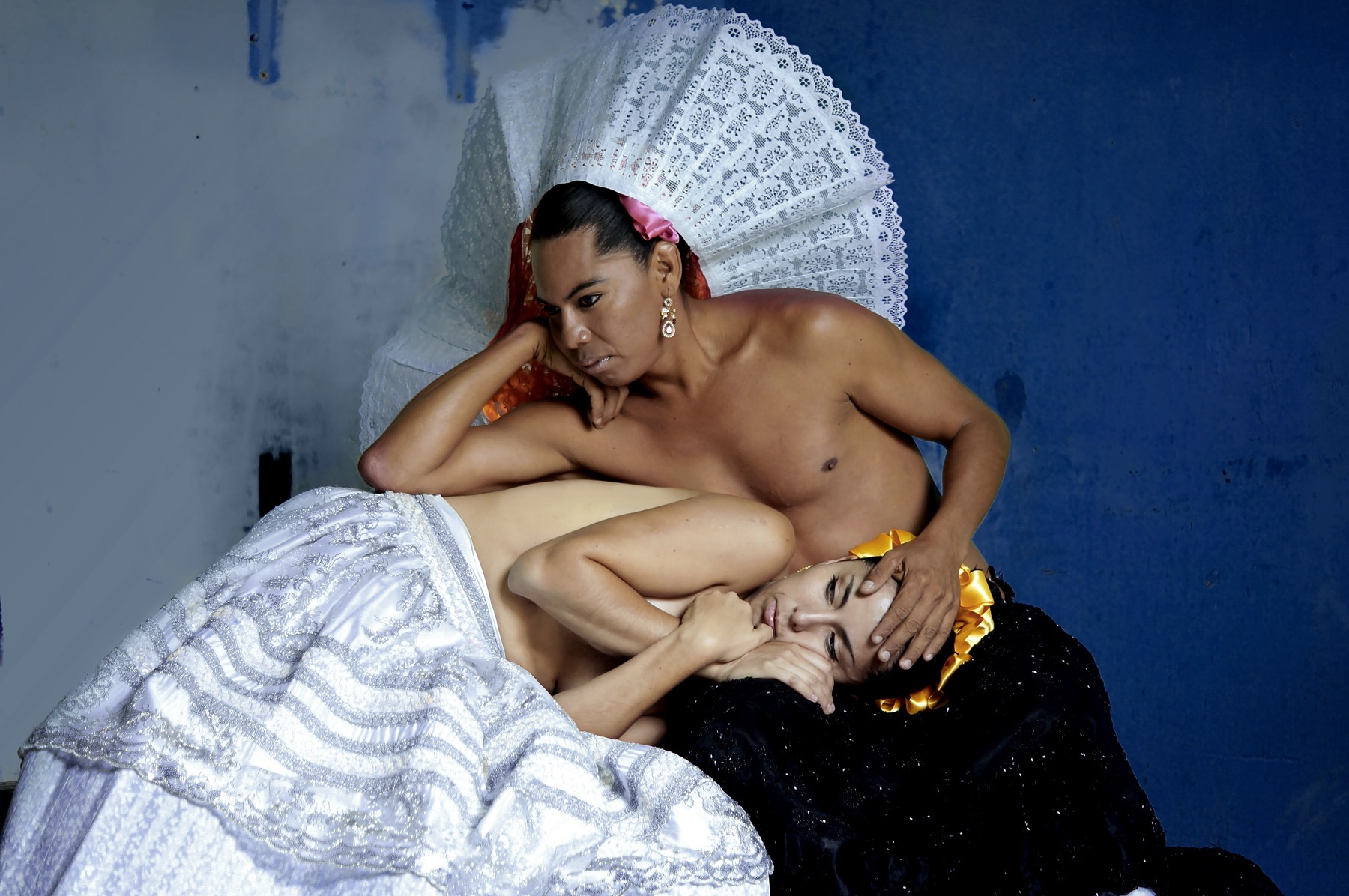
Lukas Avendano (right), muxe artist

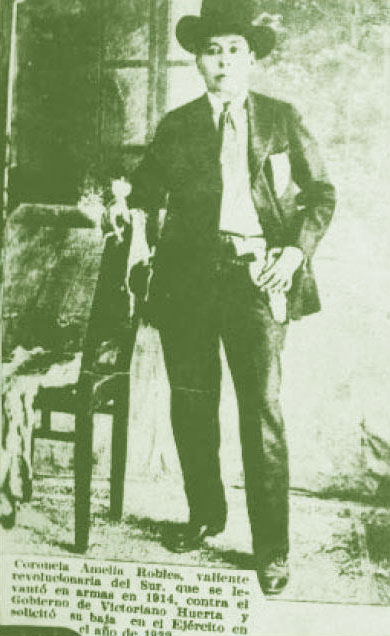
Mexican Revolution Colonel Amelio Robles, 1915

In several pre-Columbian communities across Mexico, anthropologists and colonial accounts document acceptance of third-gender categories.

The Zapotec people of Oaxaca have a third gender role for muxes, people who dress, behave and perform work otherwise associated with the other binary gender; vestidas wear feminine clothes, while pintadas wear masculine clothes but also makeup and jewellery. They may marry women or men. It has been suggested that while the three gender system predates Spanish colonization, the phenomenon of muxes dressing as women may be more recent. Juchitán de Zaragoza, an Indigenous community on the Isthmus of Tehuantepec, has so many well-accepted muxes there is a myth attributing their numbers to a bag of third-genders carried by Saint Vicent ripping and accidentally spilling many out over the town; One study estimated 6% of males in the community in the 1970s were muxes.

During the Mexican Revolution, Amelio Robles Ávila began to dress and demand to be treated as a man and, gaining respect as a capable leader, was promoted to colonel. Robles' maleness was accepted by family, society, and the Mexican government, and he lived as a man from age 24 until death; a neighbor said that if anyone called Robles a woman, Robles would threaten them with a pistol, and he killed two men who attacked him and tried to reveal his anatomy.

==== United States ====
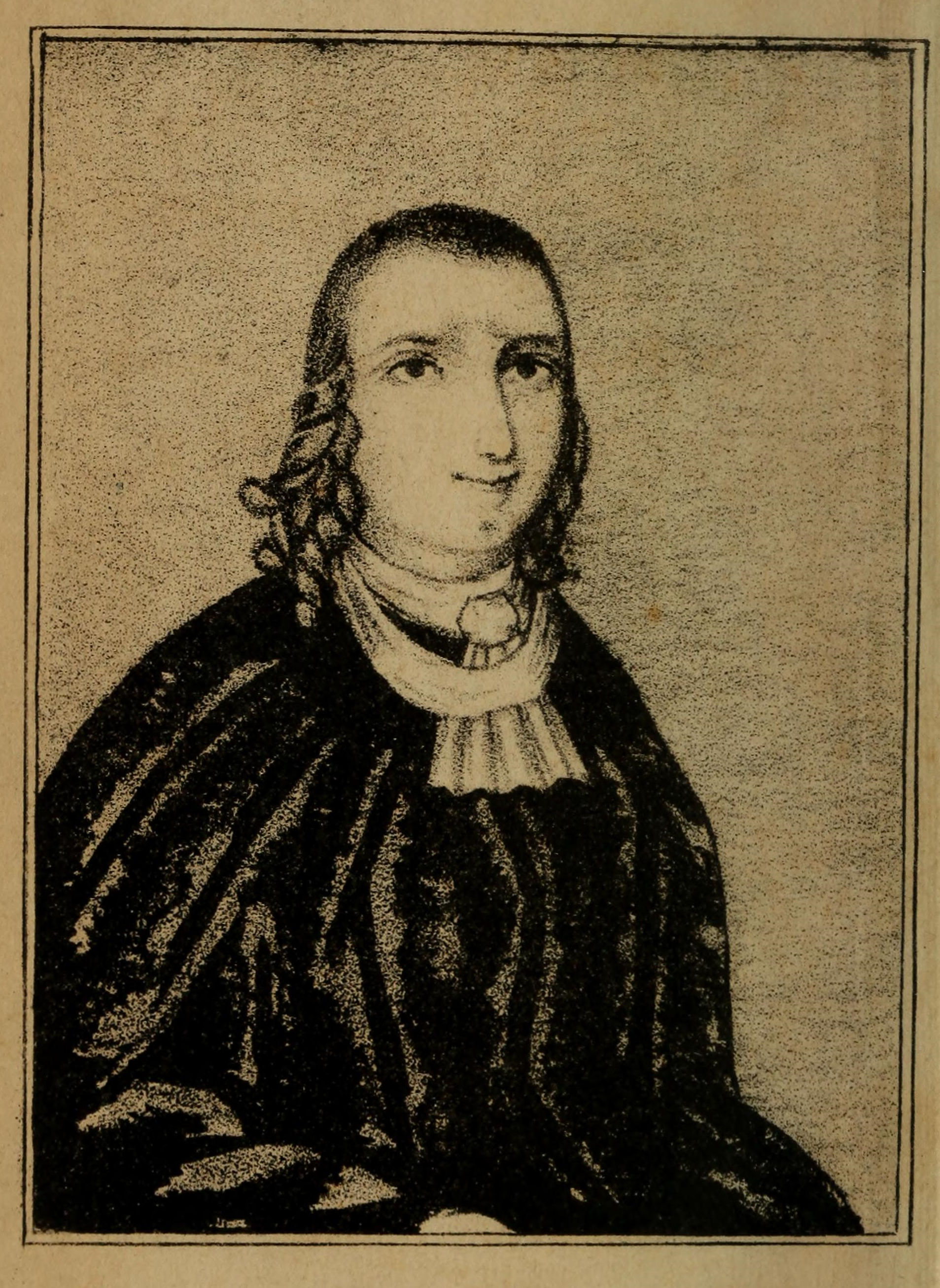
1821 portrait of the Public Universal Friend

Thomas(ine) Hall, an indentured servant in Virginia, reported being both a man and a woman and adopted clothes and roles of each at different times until ordered by a court in 1629 to wear both men's breeches and a woman's apron; Hall is thought to have been intersex and is cited as an early example of "a gender nonconforming individual in colonial America".

In 1776, the Public Universal Friend reported being genderless, dressed androgynously, and asked followers gained while preaching throughout New England over the next four decades not to use their birth name or gendered pronouns; some scholars have called the Friend a chapter in trans history "before [the word] 'transgender'". There were also cases of people living as the opposite gender in the early years of the Republic, such as Joseph Lobdell, who was assigned female at birth in 1829, lived as a man for sixty years, and married a woman. Charley Parkhurst was a stagecoach driver who was assigned female at birth but lived his professional life as a man.

During the Civil War, over 200 people who had been assigned female at birth donned men's clothing and fought as soldiers; some lived the rest of their lives as men and are thought by some to have been transgender, such as Albert Cashier. After the war, Frances Thompson, a formerly enslaved black trans woman, testified before Congress's investigation of the Memphis Riots of 1866; ten years later, she was arrested for "being a man dressed in women's clothing".

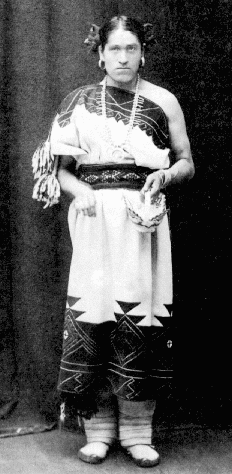
Cultural ambassador We'wha circa 1886

In the late 1800s, We'wha, a Zuni lhamana fiber artist and potter, became a prominent cultural ambassador, visiting Washington, D.C. in 1896 and meeting President Grover Cleveland. The lhamana are male-bodied people who may at times take on the social and ceremonial roles usually performed by women in their culture, and at other times the roles more traditionally associated with men.

In 1895 a group of self-described androgynes in New York organized a club called the Cercle Hermaphroditos, "to unite for defense against the world's bitter persecution". They included Jennie June (assigned male at birth in 1874), whose The Autobiography of an Androgyne (1918) was one of a few first-person accounts in the early years of the 20th century which cast light on what life for a transgender person was like then.

In some cases, immigrants would change their gender identity upon arrival in the United States, especially those assigned female at birth, ostensibly for social mobility, like Frank Woodhull, a Canadian immigrant who lived for about 15 years as a man in California and in 1908 was forced to disclose this during processing at Ellis Island.

American jazz musician and bandleader Billy Tipton (assigned female at birth in 1914) lived as a man from the 1940s until his death, while socialite and chef Lucy Hicks Anderson insisted as a child that she was a girl and was supported by her parents and doctors and later by the Oxnard, California community in which she was a popular hostess from the 1920s to 1940s. In 1917, Alan L. Hart was one of the first trans men to undergo a hysterectomy and gonadectomy, and later became a pioneering physician and radiologist.

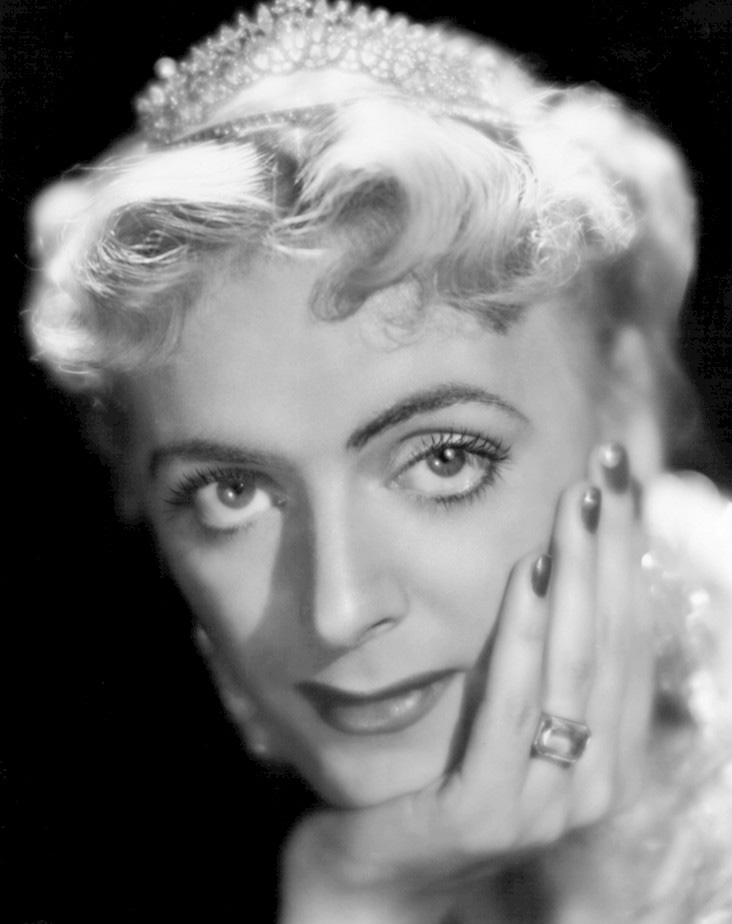
Christine Jorgensen in 1954

The possibility of someone changing sex became widely known when Christine Jorgensen in 1952 became the first person widely publicized as undergoing sex reassignment surgery. Around the same time, organizations and clubs began to form, such as Virginia Prince's Transvestia publication for an international organization of cross-dressers, but this operated in the same shadows as the still forming gay subculture. In the late 1950s and 1960s, modern transgender and gay activism began with the 1959 Cooper Donuts Riot in Los Angeles, 1966 Compton's Cafeteria riot in San Francisco, and a defining event in gay and transgender activism, the 1969 Stonewall Riots in New York; prominent activists included Sylvia Rivera.

The 1970s and 1980s saw organizations devoted to transgender social activities or activism come and go, including activist Lou Sullivan's FTM support group that grew into FTM International, the leading advocacy group for trans men. Some feminist and lesbian organizations and individuals began to debate whether transgender women should be accepted into women's groups and events. In 1972, the San Francisco chapter of the lesbian political group Daughters of Bilitis voted to no longer include trans women, expelling Beth Elliott, a trans lesbian who had served as the group's vice-president, and in 1973, a minority of attendees opposed Elliott's presence at the West Coast Lesbian Conference she had helped create. In 1976, the Michigan Womyn's Music Festival and its "women-born-women" policy began, and in 1979, Janice Raymond assailed trans woman Sandy Stone, who had been employed at the women's music collective Olivia Records. In 1987, Stone wrote "The Empire Strikes Back: A Posttranssexual Manifesto" in response, a founding text of transgender studies.

The 1990s saw the establishment of Transgender Day of Remembrance to honor those lost to violence, Paris is Burning documenting gay and trans New York ball culture, transgender marches and parades around the time of Pride celebrations, and—increasingly in the 2000s and after—the visibility of transgender people rose, with Monica Roberts starting TransGriot in the mid-2000s to model accurate media coverage of the trans community, actress Laverne Cox being on the cover of TIME in 2014 and Caitlyn Jenner coming out in 2015. Early trans officials like Joanne Conte (elected in 1991 to Arvada, Colorado's city Council) and Althea Garrison (elected to the Massachusetts house in 1992, serving from 1993 to 1995) were not out when elected in the 1990s; while Kim Coco Iwamoto became the first openly trans person elected to statewide office when she won election to the Hawaii Board of Education in 2006 (and later to the Hawaii Civil Rights Commission in 2012), and Danica Roem became the first openly trans person to serve in a state legislature when she won a seat in the Virginia house in 2017.

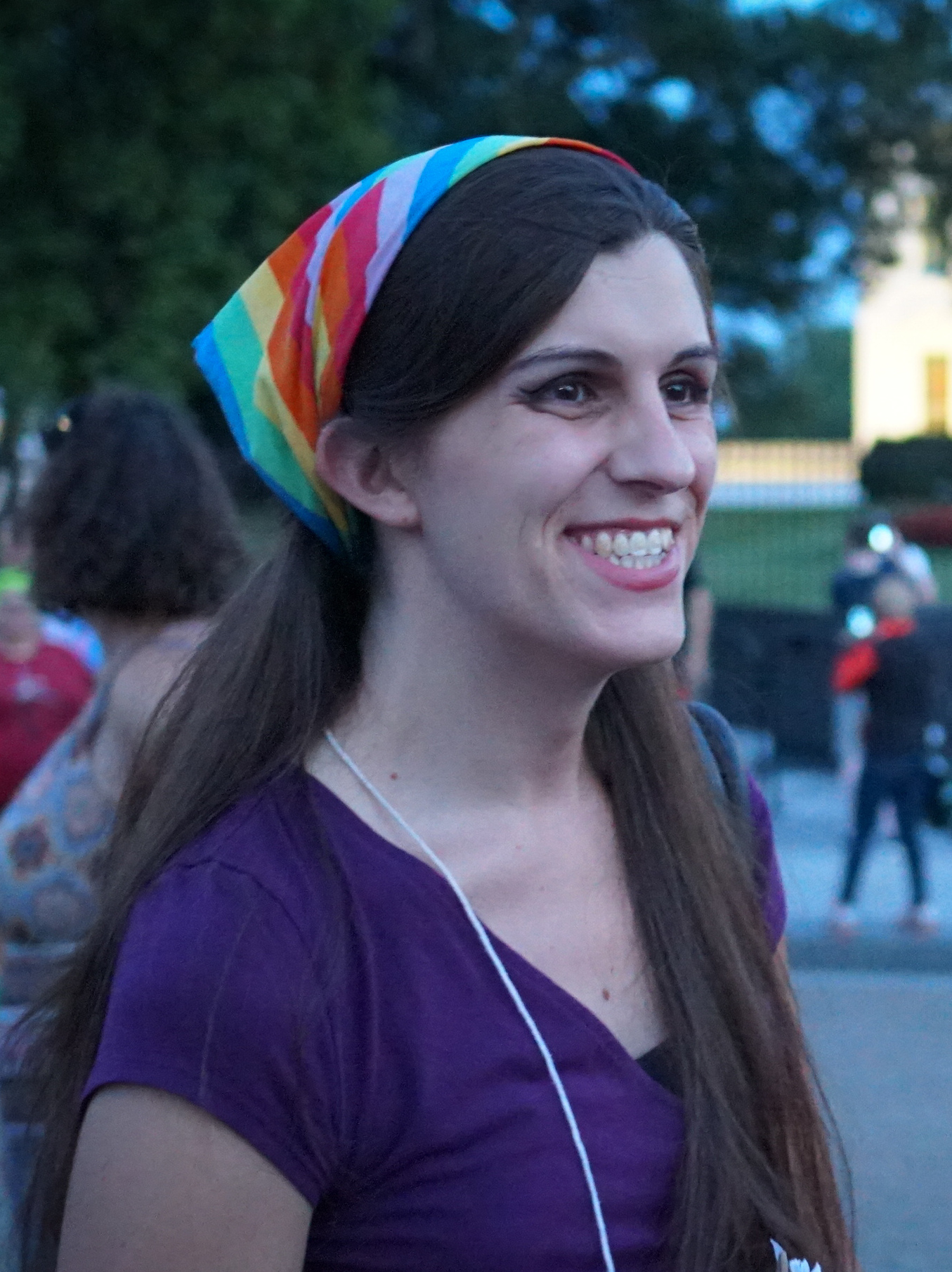
Journalist Danica Roem in 2017

Organizations such as the Girl Scouts and the Episcopal Church announced acceptance of transgender members in the 2010s. In 2016, the Obama administration issued guidance that clarified Title IX protections for transgender students, the most well-known being allowing trans students to use bathrooms and locker rooms matching their gender identity. Some legislative bodies passed discriminatory bills, such as North Carolina's HB 2 (in 2016), and beginning 2017 the Trump administration rescinded the Obama-era protections of trans students, rescinded rules against healthcare providers discriminating against trans patients, and issued a series of orders against employment of trans people by the department of defense. In 2020, the Supreme Court ruled in Bostock v. Clayton County that Title VII of the Civil Rights Act protects employees against discrimination because of gender identity (or sexual orientation).

=== South America ===
==== Bolivia ====
In 2016, Bolivia passed the Gender Identity Law, which allowed people over 18 to change their name, gender, and picture on legal documents.

==== Brazil ====
European explorers reported transmasculine and transfeminine identities among the indigenous populations in the 16th century. Beginning in the mid-18th century, sex and gender in the daily life of indigenous people was systematically restructured by the state to align with heteronormative European family structures. Over the next 100 years there were repeated arrests for cross-dressing, mostly targeting black travestis.

In the 1950s and 60s, gay bars began to open in Rio de Janeiro, and travestis gained greater prominence in the theater, having previously been relegated to Carnival and drag balls. The military dictatorship (1964–1985) heavily persecuted and censored travestis; many were systematically pressured into sex work. The abertura period (1975–1985) saw the growth of the various LGBT movements, though the Brazilian homosexual movement excluded travestis for a while. Travestis began to star in television and become household names.

By the early 1990s, travestis and transsexuals organized political organizations which organized against police violence and for better care for those with HIV/AIDS. By the late 1990s they were included in the Brazilian homosexual movement, and prominent gay and lesbian organizations expanded their scope to gay, lesbian, and travesti/transsexual. The next few decades saw greater recognition by the state, culminating in the passage of legislation in the 2010s protecting gender-affirming care, establishing the right to name and gender changes, and establishing non-discrimination protections based on gender. At the same time, violence against travestis has continued in Brazil, which in 2021 had the largest number of trans and queer people murdered worldwide for the 13th consecutive year, and the majority of the population continues to be engaged in prostitution.

==== Chile ====
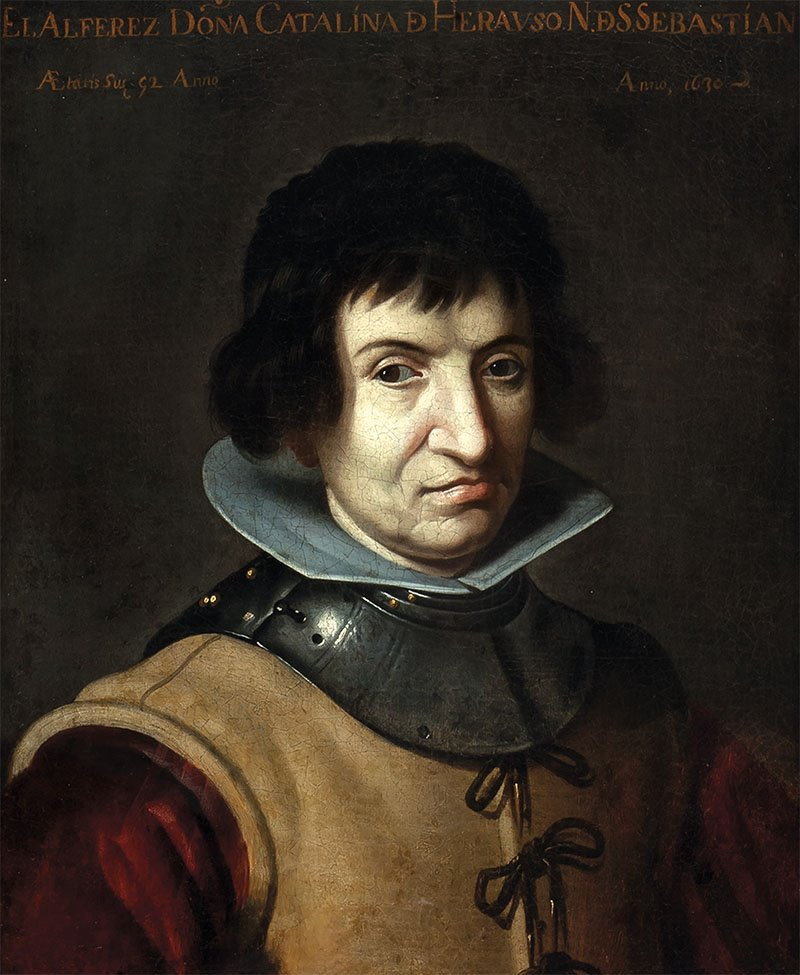
Antonio de Erauso

During the Spanish colonization era, Antonio de Erauso, born Catalina de Arauso, dressed as a man to fight in the Arauco War and was known as "the ensign nun". After being expelled from a convent in San Sebastián, Erauso set sail for the New World as a man to fight against Mapuche armies in 1619. Erauso was decorated for bravery and awarded the rank of ensign, with no one doubting Erauso's sex. In 1623, Erauso revealed the true story, and after a medical examination to prove virginity, Erauso was sent to Spain and was interviewed by King Philip IV of Spain and Pope Urban VIII, who granted Erauso the right to be treated as a man.

In March 1973, the first gender-affirming surgery in Latin America took place in Chile, when Marcia Torres underwent it in a Santiago hospital. This took place just months before the 1973 Chilean coup d'état, and the new dictatorship under Augusto Pinochet began adopting policies which criminalized and marginalized the activities of gay and trans people. Torres acquired the changed identity documents she sought from the courts after her surgery.

In 2018, President Sebastián Piñera signed the Gender Identity Law, which allows transgender people over age 14 "to update their names on legal documents and guarantees their right to be officially addressed according to their true gender."

==== Colombia ====
In December 2018, Davinson Stiven Erazo Sánchez was charged with the murder of Anyela Ramos Claros, a transgender woman, as a gender-based hate crime. Under the Rosa Elvira Cely law, feminicide, defined as "the killing of a woman because of her gender, or where there were previous instances of violence between the victim and the accused, including sexual violence," was made punishable by a prison sentence of 20 to 50 years. Claros was only the second transgender woman to have her murderer punished under this law.

==== Peru ====
Before the 16th-century arrival of Spanish conquistadors, the Inca Empire and their Moche predecessors revered third-gender persons. They organized their society around an Andean cosmovision that allowed for masculine-feminine ambiguity grounded in "complementary dualism." Third-gender shamans as ritual practitioners were subject to violence as the Spanish suppressed pre-colonial worldviews.

In 2014, the Peruvian Constitutional Court ruled against a transgender woman changing her gender on her national identity document. Still, in October 2016, the court reversed the earlier decision, acknowledging "people are not only defined by their biological sex, but one must also take into consideration their psychic and social reality." Following this, transgender people in Peru can petition a judge for a legal gender change without having undergone sexual reassignment surgery.

==== Uruguay ====
In 2018, Uruguay passed a law granting rights to transgender people, entitling them to gender confirmation surgery and hormones paid for by the state. The law also mandates that some transgender people receive public jobs. Transgender people can now specify their gender identity and change their legal name without requiring approval from a judge. In addition, transgender people who suffered persecution during the Uruguayan military dictatorship from 1973 to 1985 will receive compensation. The law also allows minors (under 18) to change their name without prior parental or court approval legally.

== Asia ==
=== West Asia (the Middle East) ===
For the history of Roman and Byzantine Asia, see § Rome and Byzantium.

==== Arabian peninsula ====
Khanith are a gender category in Oman and Arabia who function in some sexual and social ways as women, and are variously considered to fill an "alternative gender role", to be transgender, or (as they are still considered men by Omani standards and laws) to be transvestites. Discussing the (male-assigned) khanith, older mukhannathun and Egyptian khawalat, and the (female-assigned) ghulamiyat, Everett Rowson writes there is "considerable evidence for institutionalized cross-dressing and other cross-gender behavior in pre-modern Muslim societies, among both men and to some extent women" which existed from Muhammad's day and continued into the Umayyad and Abbasid periods and, in the khanith, into the present.

==== Iran ====
Under Shah Mohammad Reza Pahlavi, transsexuals and crossdressers were classed with gays and lesbians and faced lashing or death.

Beginning in the 1970s, trans woman Maryam Khatoon Molkara wrote to Ruhollah Khomeini asking for support to live as a woman, and building on a 1963 decision that corrective surgery for intersex people was not against Islamic law, he agreed. After the Islamic Revolution, Molkara was institutionalized and forced to detransition, but later released, and in 1985 personally convinced Ahmad Khomeini to decree transition and sex reassignment surgery allowed in Islamic law; she advocated for transgender rights until she died in 2012.

The government pays up to half the cost for those needing financial assistance, and a sex change is recognized on one's birth certificate. Some gay people are also pressured into sex reassignment.

==== Israel and Palestine ====
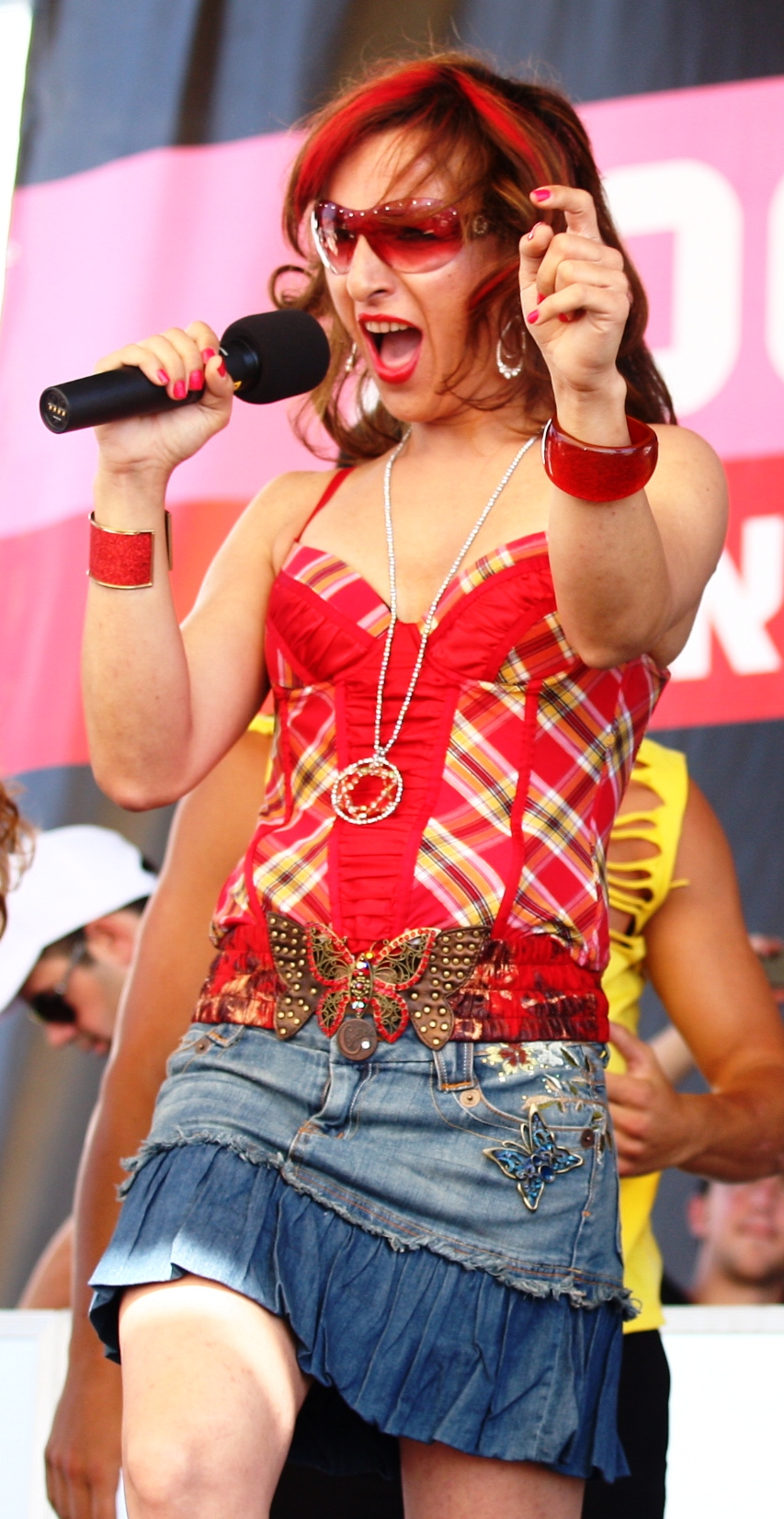
Aderet in 2009

In 1998, Israeli pop singer Dana International became the first trans person to enter and win the Eurovision Song Contest. In 2008, singer and trans woman Aderet became popular in Israel and neighboring Lebanon.

The second week of June is the Tel Aviv Pride Parade, during international LGBT Pride month. In 2008 it coincided with the building of an LGBT Centre in Tel Aviv. In 2015, the parade was led by Gila Goldstein, who in the 1960s became one of the first Israelis to receive sex reassignment surgery. The festival is popular, with over 200,000 participants in 2016.

==== Ottoman Empire ====
Eunuchs, who served in the Ottoman Empire from the 16th to late 19th century (and were commonly exiled to Egypt after their terms, where black eunuchs had served pre-Ottoman rulers as civil servants since the 10th century) have sometimes been viewed as a kind of third gender or an alternative male gender.

=== North Asia ===
Early Russian ethnographers observed that Chukchi shamans in Siberia were sometimes said to be called by mystical forces to engage in a form of ritualized homosexual relations with other men. This ritual typically involved a gender change — a religious ceremony that, it was believed, transformed a shaman's genitalia into those of a female. After the change, the shaman might dress in women's clothing and behave in feminine ways. He was then believed to "lose" masculine traits, such as hunting skills, and instead take on "feminine" traits, such as healing and nurturing. Some of these shamans would take male lovers, and could even marry other men, and the shaman would take on a "wifely" role. Homosexual relations outside of this specialized role were reportedly not tolerated.

=== East Asia ===
==== China ====
Eunuchs existed in China over 3000 years ago. They were imperial servants and common as civil servants from the time of the Qin dynasty until a century ago. Eunuchs have sometimes been viewed as a third sex or a transgender practice, and Chinese histories have often expressed the relationship of a ruler to his officials in the terms of a male relationship to females.

Cross-gender behavior has long been common in Chinese theatre, especially in dan roles, since at least the Ming and Qing dynasties. Today, Jin Xing is a well-known entertainer and trans woman.

In the mid-1930s, after Yao Jinping's father went missing during the war with Japan, the 19-year-old reported having lost all feminine traits and become a man (and was said to have an Adam's apple and flattened breasts) and left to find him; the press widely reported on the event. Du He, who wrote an account of it, insisted Yao did become a man; Yao has been compared to both Lili Elbe (who underwent sex reassignment in the same decade) and Hua Mulan (a mythical wartime crossdresser).

In the 1950s, doctors in Taiwan forced Xie Jianshun, an intersex man, to undergo male-to-female sex reassignment surgery; Taiwanese press compared the former soldier to Christine Jorgensen, who had sought out surgery, and the decade-long media frenzy over Xie led to increased coverage of intersex and transgender people in general.

In the 1990s, transgender studies was established as an academic discipline. Transgender people are considered a "sexual minority" in China, where widespread transphobia means trans people face discrimination in accessing housing, education, work, and healthcare. China requires trans people to get the consent of their families before sex reassignment surgery, leading many to buy hormones on the black market and attempt surgeries on themselves.

On October 31, 2024, a Chinese transgender woman was approved by Changli county people's court in Qinhuangdao to receive 60,000 yuan (£6,552) in compensation from a hospital that gave her electroshock conversion treatment against her will. This was the first time any transgender person in China won a legal challenge against the use of electroshock conversion treatment.

==== Japan ====
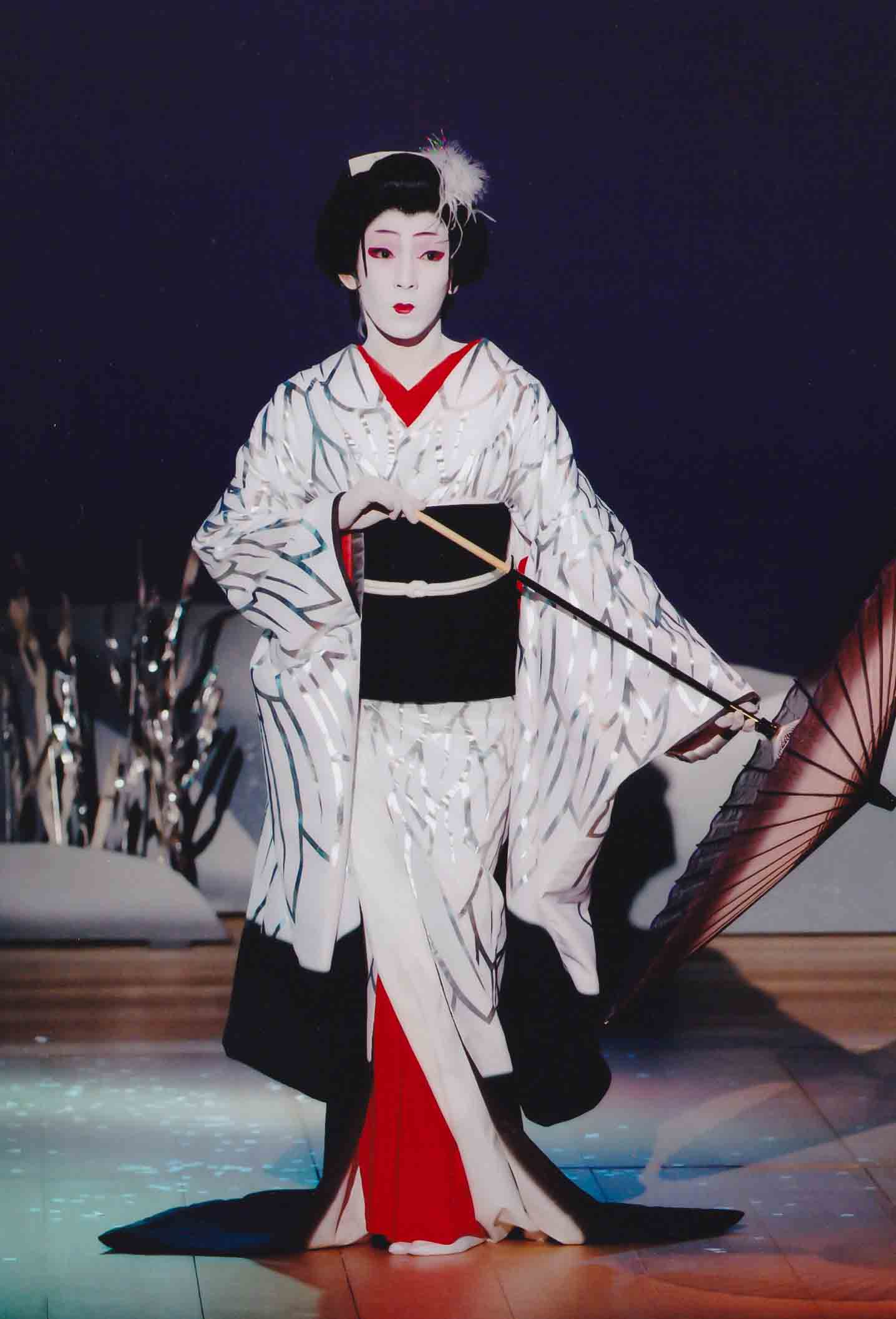
Kabuki dance by onnagata Akifusa Guraku

Historical documentation of male- and female-assigned transgender people is extensive, especially in the Edo period. Trans-masculine people were found especially in Yoshiwara, Edo's red-light district, and in the modern era have worked in onabe bars since the 1960s. At the start of the Edo period in 1603, Izumo no Okuni founded kabuki (dressing as a handsome man to tryst with a woman in one popular performance, and being honored with a statue near where she performed which depicts her as a cross-dressing samurai with a sword and fan); in 1629, when the Tokugawa shogunate banned women from acting, male performers took on the roles of women. Some, such as the onnagata actor Yoshizawa Ayame I (1673–1729), dressed, behaved, and ate like women even outside the theatre.

In 2004 Japan passed a law requiring people who want to change their gender marker to have sex reassignment surgery and be sterilized, be single, and have no children under age 20, which the supreme court upheld in 2019. In 2017, Japan became one of the first countries in the modern world to elect an openly trans man to office, electing Tomoya Hosoda as a city councillor in Iruma.

=== South and Southeast Asia ===
==== Cambodia ====
Under the Khmer Rouge, Phnom Penh's trans community was expelled or killed, and trans women and men were raped, jailed, or killed. Some escaped and live as refugees in the US.

==== Indian subcontinent ====
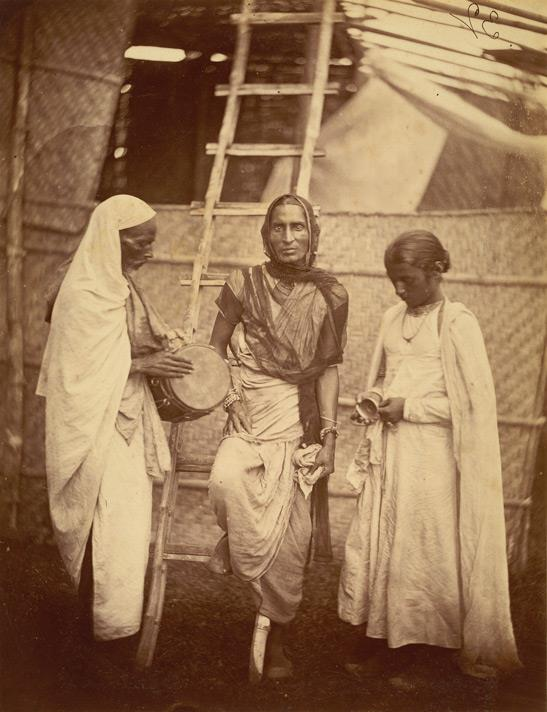
Hijra and companions in East Bengal in the 1860s

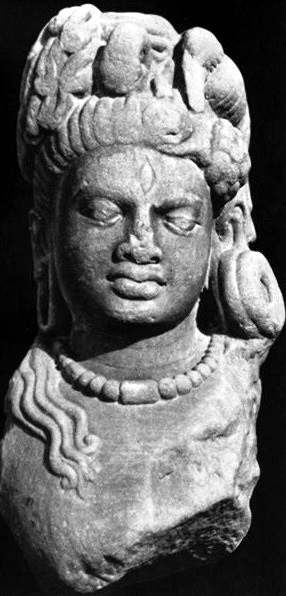
First- to fourth-century head of Ardhanarishvara

Indian texts dating back as early as 3000 years ago document a third gender, which has been associated with the hijras, who have formed a category of third-gender or trans-feminine people on the Indian subcontinent since ancient times. In the Rigveda (from roughly 3500 years ago), it is said that before creation the world lacked all distinctions, including of sex and gender, a state ancient poets expressed with images like men with wombs or breasts. The Mahabharata (from 2–3000 years ago) tells of a trans man, Shikhandi. In the Ramayana (from roughly 2000 years ago), when Rama asks "men and women" not to follow him, hijras remain and he blesses them. Most hijras are assigned male at birth (and may or may not castrate themselves), but some are intersex and a few are assigned female. Hijras wear feminine clothing and usually adopt feminine names, often live together in households (often regardless of differences in caste or religion) and relate to each other as female fictive kin (sisters, daughters, etc.), and perform at events such as births and weddings.

The Buddhist Tipitaka, composed about 2100 years ago, documents four gender categories: female, male, pandaka, and ubhatobyanjanaka. It says the Buddha was tolerant of monks transitioning to nuns, at least initially, though trans people did face some stigma, and the possibility of monastic transition was later curtailed when the tradition of female monasticism was extinguished in Theravada Buddhism, and between the third to fifth century, Indian Buddhists were hostile to transgender people. These trans- and third-gender categories have been connected to the § kathoeys who exist in Thailand.

Beginning in the 1870s, the colonial authorities attempted to eliminate hijras, prohibiting their performances and transvestism. In India, since independence, several state governments have introduced specific welfare programs to redress historical discrimination against hijras and transgender people. Today, there are at least 490,000 hijras in India, and an estimated 10,000 to 500,000 in Bangladesh, and they are legally recognized as a third gender in Bangladesh, India, Nepal, and Pakistan. In 1999, Kamla Jaan became the first hijra elected mayor of an Indian city, Katni, and around the same time Shabnam Mausi was elected as a legislator from Gorakhpur. In Bangladesh, in 2019, several trans people filed to run for parliament, which currently has no trans or hijra members.

In Hinduism, Ardhanarishvara, a half-male, half-female fusion of Shiva and Shakti, is one of several deities important to many hijras and transgender Hindus, and has been called an androgynous and transgender deity.

==== Indonesia ====
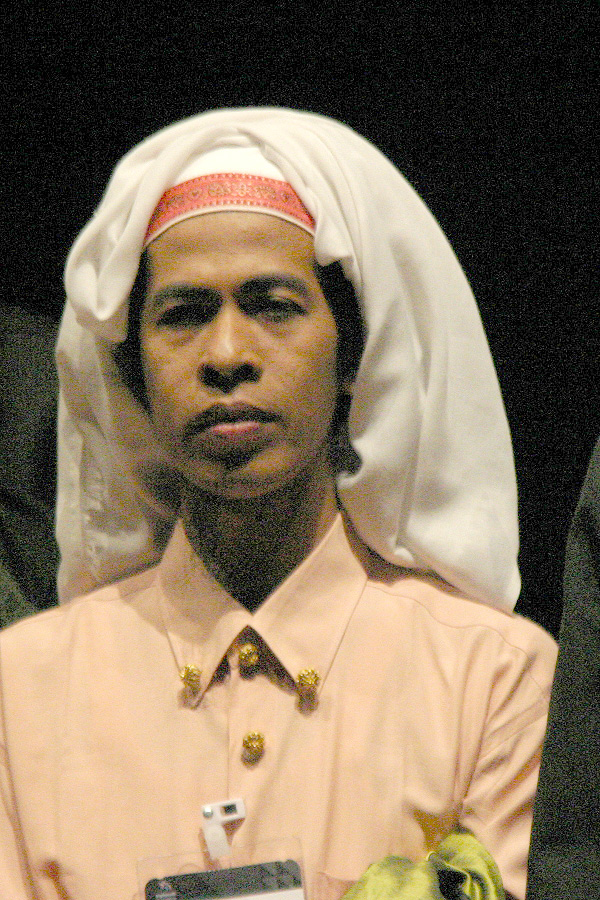
A Bugis bissu in 2004

Indonesia has a trans-/third-gender category of people called waria. It has been estimated that there are over 7 million waria in the Indonesian population of 240-260 million people.

The Bugis of Sulawesi recognize three sexes (male, female, intersex) and five genders: makkunrai, comparable to cisgender women; oroané, to cisgender men; calabai, to trans women; calalai, to trans men; and bissu, an androgynous gender.

An all-transgender netball team from Indonesia competed at the 1994 Gay Games in New York City. The team had been the Indonesian national champions.

==== Philippines ====
Today, male-assigned people who adopt a feminine gender expression and are transgender or gay are termed bakla and sometimes considered a third gender. Historically, cross-gender babaylan shamans were respected and termed bayog or bayoc in Luzon and asog in the Visayan Islands until outlawed in 1625 and suppressed by Spanish colonial authorities. The Teduray people in Mindanao accepted two trans identities, mentefuwaley lagey ("one who became a man") and mentefuwaley libun ("one who became a woman") into at least the 1960s. Crossdressing was practiced during American colonial rule. Singer and actress Helen Cruz was a prominent trans figure, especially in the 1960s, and pioneer of Swardspeak.

==== Thailand ====
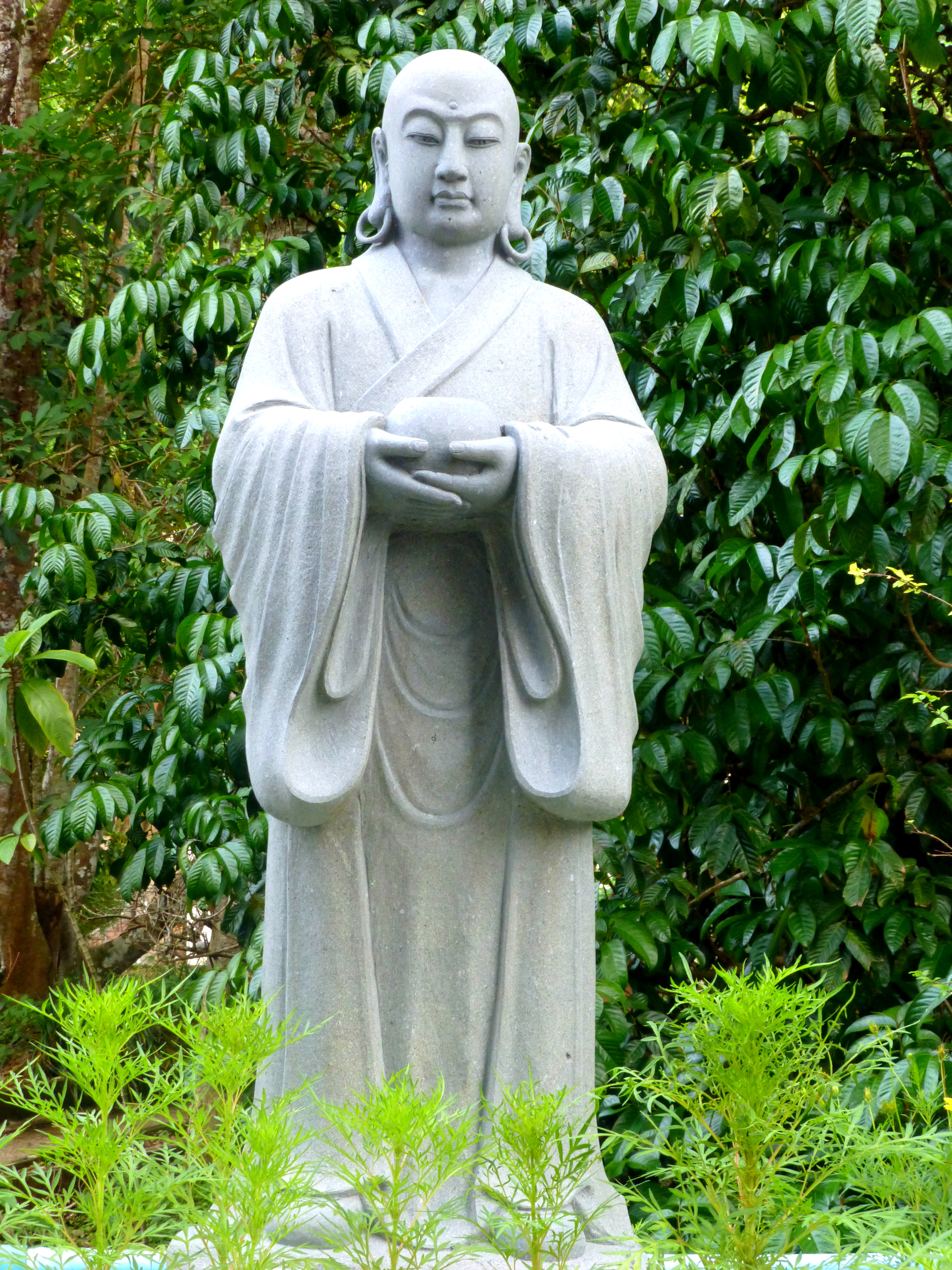
Some Thais say Ananda was a kathoey in many previous lives.

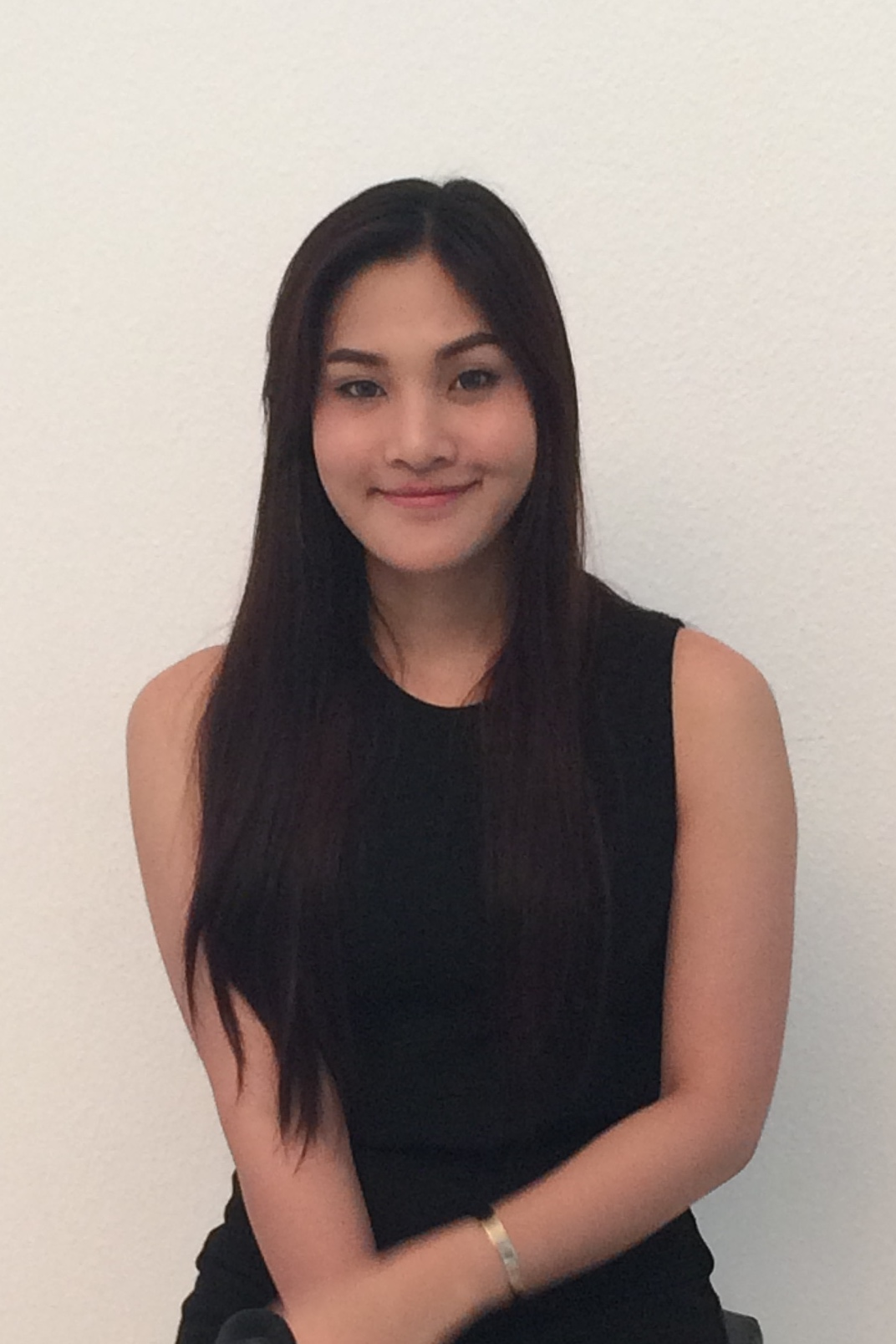
Bell Nuntita, Thai trans woman and member of the kathoey band Venus Flytrap

Some (especially Thai) scholars identify the third- and fourth-gender categories documented in the Tipitaka with the kathoey, a third-gender category that was already part of traditional Thai and Khmer culture by the time the scripture was composed about 2100 years ago. Some (especially Thai) Buddhists say Ananda (Buddha's cousin and attendant) was born a kathoey/transgender in many previous lives, but that it was to expiate for a past misdeed.

The category of kathoey was historically open to male-assigned, female-assigned, and intersex people. Since the 1970s, the term has come to be used (by others) to denote mainly male-assigned transvestites or trans women, the latter of whom usually refer to themselves simply as phuying ("women"); a minority refer to themselves as phuying praphet song ("second-type women") or sao praphet song ("second-type females"), and only very few refer to themselves as kathoey. Kathoey is often rendered into English as "ladyboy".

Thailand has become a center for performing sex reassignment surgery, and now performs more than any other country. In 2015, the government proposed recognizing third-gender people in the constitution, but instead only retained personal protections regardless of phet ("sex") which was interpreted to include trans people; a third gender is not recognized on identity documents.

== Europe ==
=== Earliest history ===
Certain drawings and figures from the Neolithic period and Bronze Age found around the Mediterranean have been interpreted as genderless.

Near what is today Prague, a burial from 4,900 to 4,500 years ago was found of a biologically male skeleton in a woman's outfit with feminine grave goods, which some archaeologists consider an early transgender burial.

=== Ancient Greece, Ancient Rome, and Byzantium ===
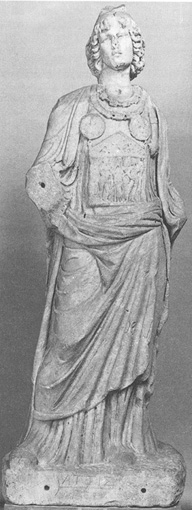
2nd century statue of a gallus priest

In Ancient Greece, Phrygia, and the Roman Republic and Empire, Cybele and Attis were worshiped by galli priests (documented from around 200 BCE to around 300 CE) who wore feminine clothes, referred to themselves as women, and often castrated themselves, and have therefore been seen as early transgender figures.

In Rome, cross-dressing was also practiced during Saturnalia, which some argue reinforced established gender identities by making such practices unacceptable outside that rite. Romans also viewed cross-dressing negatively and imposed it as a punishment, as when Charondas of Catane decreed deserters wear female clothes for three days or when, after Crassus' defeat, the Persians hung a lookalike of the dead general clad as a woman.

Works by Philo of Alexandria and Marcus Manilius during the early Roman Empire have been referenced by some scholars in relation to trans people; classical historian Paul Chrystal wrote that Philo's account "describes transsexuals". In his treatise On the Special Laws, Philo wrote that "expending every possible care on their outward adornment," some people were "not ashamed even to employ every device to change artificially their nature as men into women". "Craving a complete transformation into women", some even had their penises removed.

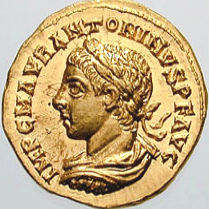
Roman aureus coin depicting Elagabalus

Women who cross-dressed as men could have access to male opportunities, as depicted in the fictional story of an Athenian woman dressing as a man to vote in the ekklesia in Aristophane's Ekklesiazusae, or when Agnodice of Athens dressed as a man to get a degree in medicine, Axiothea from Phlius cross-dressed to attend Plato's lectures, and Cornelia, the wife of general Gaius Calvisius Sabinus dressed as a soldier to join a military camp.

The Roman historians Cassius Dio and Herodian, the former an opponent of the Roman emperor Elagabalus (c. 204 – 222), claimed the ruler to have depilated, worn makeup and wigs, rejected being called a lord and preferred being called a lady, and offered vast sums of money to any physician who could provide the imperial body with female genitalia. Despite marrying several women, the Syrian's most stable relationship was with chariot driver Hierocles, and Cassius Dio says Elagabalus delighted in being called Hierocles' mistress, wife, and queen. The Severan emperor has therefore been seen by some writers as transgender or transsexual. Other writers, however, have contrasted the unreliable nature of the surviving sources on Elagabalus with the oddly specific claims made by those sources. It has been noted that while plenty of Roman figures have been slandered in the historical record, none are said to have desired a gender transition. As a result, it may be difficult to determine whether or not Elagabalus truly expressed these desires. The North Hertfordshire Museum started referring to Elagabalus with she/her pronouns in 2023.

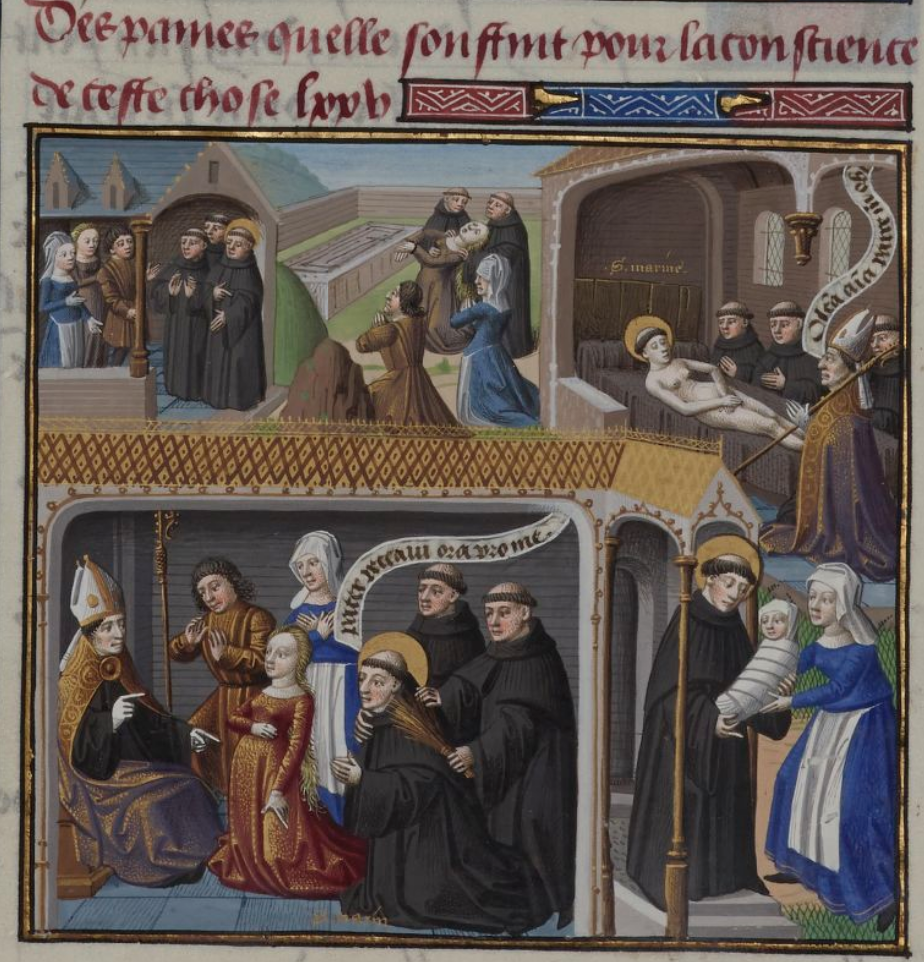
Illuminated manuscript from the Speculum Historiale of Vincent of Beauvais showing the story of Marina Marinos (Paris, BnF, Français 51 f.201v); the upper right corner shows the revelation that Marinos/Marina has breasts.

In the 500s, Anastasia the Patrician fled life in the court of Justinian I in Constantinople to spend twenty-eight years (until death) dressed as a male monk in Egypt, coming to be viewed by some today as a transgender saint. Coptic texts from that era (the fifth to ninth centuries), like texts from around Europe, tell of many female-assigned people transitioning to live as men; in one, a monastic named Hilaria (child of Zeno) dresses as a man, brings about a reduction in breast size and cessation of menstruation through asceticism, and comes to be accepted by fellow monks as a male, Hilarion, and by some modern scholars as trans; the story of Marinos (Marina), another Byzantine, who became a monk in Lebanon, is similar. While modern gender historians often analyze these figures through a transgender lens, traditional scholarship generally views their adoption of male clothing as a practical disguise to escape danger, avoid marriage, or pursue ascetic monastic life.

Other Byzantine hagiographies describe eunuchs, who occupied a kind of third-gender status, like Ignatios of Constantinople (who became patriarch of Constantinople and a saint).

=== Roman Britain ===
In 2002, analysis of a skeleton found in earlier excavations in Catterick, England revealed what was originally reported as a woman wearing ornamental jewelry but was later interpreted as a man and possibly a gallus in 4th century Roman Britain.

=== Early Scandinavia, Viking-era Norse ===
Norse society stigmatized effeminacy (especially sexual passivity, but also—it is sometimes said—transgender and cross-dressing behavior), calling it ergi, At the same time, the characteristics the Norse revered in their gods were complicated; Odin was skilled in effeminate seiðr magic, and assumed the form of a woman in several myths, and Loki too changed gender on several occasions (for which reason some modern works label or depict the trickster deity as genderfluid).

In 2017, archaeologists found that the bones of a Viking buried in Birka with masculine grave goods were female; some suggested the burial could be a trans man, but the original archaeologists said they did not want to apply a "modern" term and preferred to see the person as a woman.

=== Middle Ages ===
Gregory of Tours in his 6th century History of the Franks, included a story in which Leubovera, Radegund's successor as the monastery of the Holy Cross in Poitiers abbess, was accused of keeping two "men dressed like women" in the monastery. One of them functioned as a woman (because of "being unable to do men's work") outside of the monastery and had never met Leubovera, the other was a boy castrated for health reasons (by Radegund) who nevertheless did not socially function as a woman. This proved Leubovera innocent of the charge.

A 2021 study concluded that a grave from 1050 to 1300 in Hattula, Finland, containing a body buried in feminine clothing with brooches, valuable furs and a hiltless sword (with a second sword later buried above the original grave), which earlier researchers speculated to be two bodies (a male and female) or a powerful woman, was one person with Klinefelter syndrome and that "the overall context of the grave indicates that it was a respected person whose gender identity may well have been non-binary".

In the 1322 book Even Boḥan, Kalonymus ben Kalonymus (from Provence, France) wrote a poem expressing lament at and cursing having been born a boy, calling a penis as a "defect" and wishing to have been created as a woman, which some writers see as an expression of gender dysphoria and identification as a trans woman.

In 1394, London authorities arrested a male-bodied sex worker in women's clothing who went by the name Eleanor Rykener. Rykener reported having first gotten women's clothing, and learned embroidery (perhaps completing an apprenticeship, as female apprentices did) and how to sleep with men for pay, from Elizabeth Brouderer; Rykener also slept with women. Rykener's testimony offers a glimpse into medieval sexual identities. Carolyn Dinshaw suggests Rykener's living and working in Oxford as a woman for some time indicates Rykener enjoyed doing so, and Cordelia Beattie says "it is evident [Rykener] could pass as a woman", and passing "in everyday life would have involved other gendered behaviour"; historian Ruth Mazo Karras argues Rykener was a trans woman, and could also be described as bisexual. Historian Judith Bennett argues people were familiar enough with hermaphroditism that "Rykener's repeated forays into the space between 'male' and 'female' might have been as unremarkable in the streets of fourteenth-century London as they would be in Soho today", while Robert Mills argues officials would have been even more concerned by Rykener's switching of gender roles than by sex work.

A few medieval works explore female-to-male transformation and trans figures. In the 13th century French Roman de Silence, Nature and Nurture personified try to sway a child born a girl but raised a boy, who longs to do some feminine things but also long enjoys life as a man before being put into a female identity and clothing at the end of the story; Silence has been viewed as (at least temporarily) transgender. Christine de Pizan's Livre de la mutacion de Fortune (1403) opens "I who was formerly a woman, am now in fact a man [...] my current self-description is the truth. But I shall describe by means of fiction the fact of my transformation" using the metaphor of Iphis and Ianthe (a myth John Gower's Iphis and Ianthe also took up), leading some modern scholars to also view Fortune's protagonist (and Gower's) as transgender.

==== Medieval Christian church ====
The medieval church acknowledged trans figures and non-normative gender traits and were often interpreted as expressions of God's plan, rather than deviations from it. Many transmasculine saints and clergy members were celebrated and uplifted by the medieval church. They were canonized in the early days of Christianity on account of their "extraordinary lives" and the view that God extraordinarily blessed them. Jesus himself was interpreted through the lens of androgyny, and Francis of Assisi, who referred to Jesus as a "mother", had also personally used female descriptors ("Lady Poverty", "mother") and lived a life described nowadays as gender-bending and gender-nonconforming. As the medieval church developed stricter policies and procedures, its view of non-normative gender traits (including transness) changed.

Marina the Monk, or Marinos, was a transmasculine person in the clergy. Sources vary, but he likely lived somewhere between the fifth and eighth centuries near modern-day Syria. Marinos, though assigned female at birth, chose to enter a monastery as a monk, following his father and saying the modesty and abstinence that came with the life of a monk would protect his identity. He was expelled from the monastery after a woman accused him of impregnating her, but never refuted the claims made against him, as doing so would involve revealing his genitals; instead, he fathered the child and was eventually allowed back into the monastery along with his son. His sex was only discovered after his death. He is named a saint by both the Roman Catholic and Eastern Orthodox Churches.

The theme of "sexual disguise" of people assigned female at birth was popular, especially in early monasticism. Numerous female hermits living alone in the desert dressed identically to male hermits. Mary of Egypt, born in Alexandria in the early fifth century, is a popular example of an "emasculated female saint." In depictions of her after her conversion to ascetic life, both in visual art and in personal accounts, Mary is portrayed as seemingly genderless. When she stripped herself of all aspects of her previous identity, she also seemed to have shed her gender. Thecla, a contemporary of the apostle Paul, shaved her head and adopted a man's dress to prove her devotion and piety. She, like Mary of Egypt, shed her female identity in pursuit of a devoutly religious lifestyle.

Transmasculine ideas continued to show up in religious writing throughout the Middle Ages. One story that bridges the gap between secular and religious ideas of transness is the fictional tale of Blanchandin, which offers insight into attitudes towards transgender people in the Middle Ages. The fourteenth-century chanson de geste Tristan de Nanteuil recounts how Blanchandin was physically transformed from a woman to a man to father St. Gilles, after an angel appeared and gave him testicles and a penis. Rather than being portrayed as a transgression against the natural order, this transition is seen as a "radiant expression of God's will". Blanchandin was viewed as having a special relationship to God and to his mission on earth.

Historian Caroline Walker Bynum has explored the idea of Jesus as an androgynous figure. In the 12th century, the idea of "mother Jesus" began to appear more frequently in religious texts. In many Cistercian texts, Jesus is described as both the son of God and the mother of all people. He is ascribed traits like nurturing and affectionate, which were not used to describe men at the time, presenting Jesus as somewhere between distinctly male and distinctly female.

Around the turn of the thirteenth century, the church's view of trans people began to change. The church developed a firmer stance on issues, including non-normative gender expressions. As tensions rose between Christianity and Judaism, so did the divide between who was a part of the church and who was not. Those who did not fit neatly into the gender binary did not fit into the church. Religious doctrine insisted that intersex people choose one sex organ or the other to perform sexual acts with, lest they be accused of engaging in sodomy. The Cathars, who erased all ideas of sex and gender from their belief system, were labeled as heretics. The church's reaction to the Cathars exemplified a greater trend within the medieval church, one that did not accept rejection of the gender binary.

=== Balkans ===
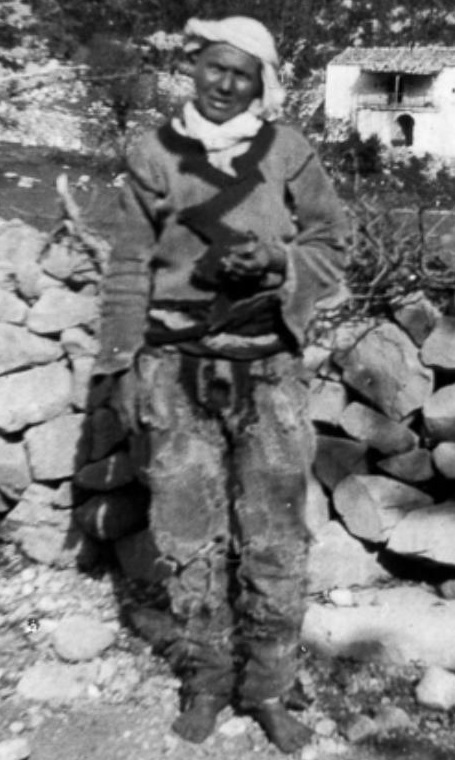
Sworn virgin in Albania in 1908

Balkan sworn virgins such as Stana Cerović are women who take a vow of chastity and live as men; they dress as men, socialize with men, do men's activities, and are usually referred to with masculine pronouns in and outside their presence. In some cases, this is considered a separate third gender. They take their name from the vow of celibacy they traditionally swore. The gender role, found among several national and religious groups in the Balkans (including Muslims and Christians in Albania, Bosnia, Macedonia, and Dalmatia), dates to at least the 15th century. It is thought to be the only traditional, formally socially defined trans-masculine gender role in Europe, but it has been suggested that it may be a survival of a more widespread pre-Christian European gender category.

=== Belgium ===
On October 1, 2020, Petra De Sutter was sworn in as a deputy prime minister of Belgium under Alexander De Croo, becoming the most senior trans politician in Europe; De Sutter was previously a Belgian senator and a Member of the European Parliament, and is a gynaecologist and the head of the department of reproductive medicine at Ghent University Hospital.

=== Denmark ===
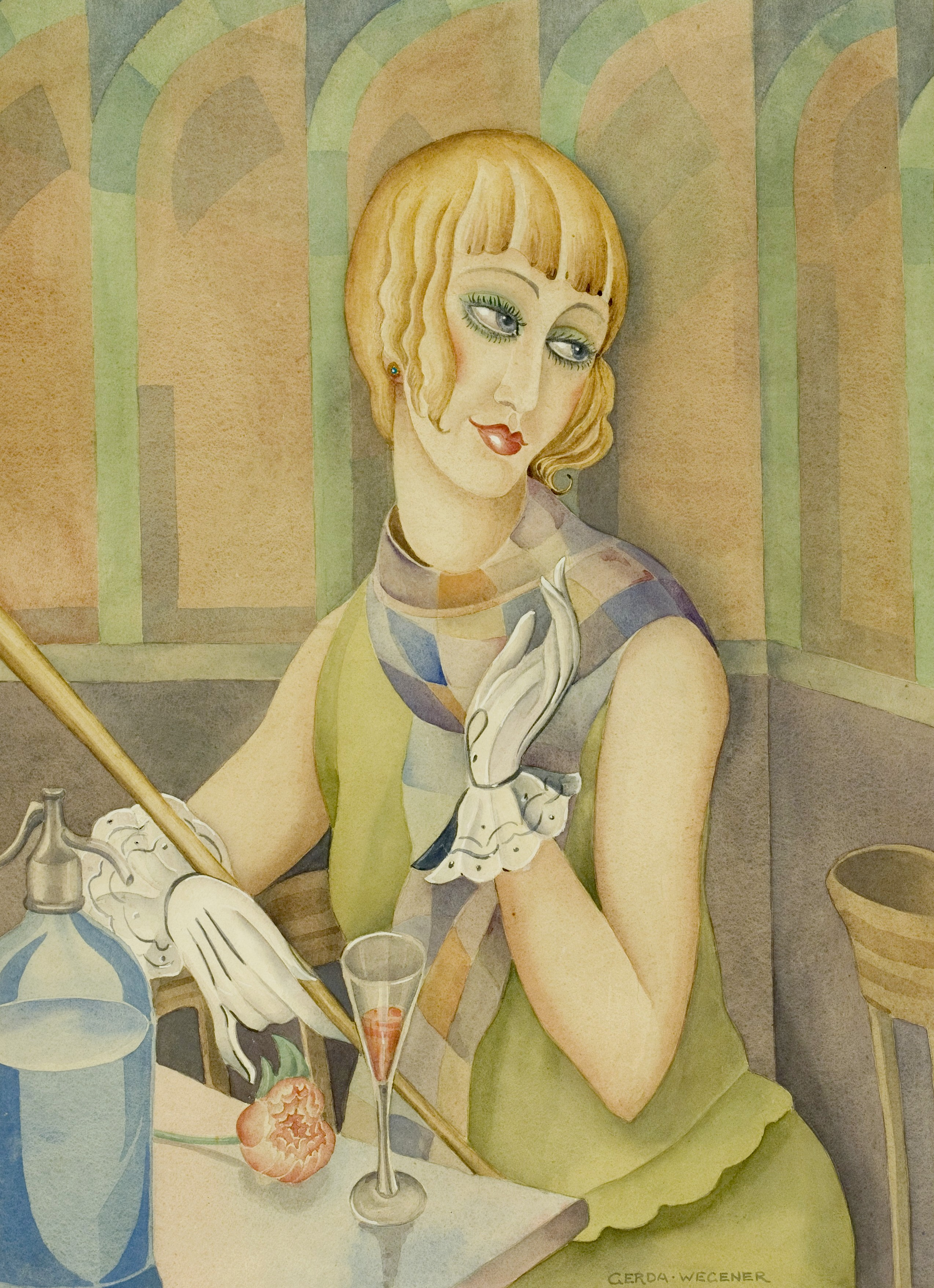
Lili Elbe

Lili Elbe was a Danish trans woman and one of the first recipients of sex reassignment surgery. Elbe was assigned male at birth and was a successful painter before transitioning. She transitioned in 1930 and changed her legal name to Lili Ilse Elvenes. She died in 1931 from complications after ovary and uterus transplants.

Denmark is also known for its role in the transition of American Christine Jorgensen, whose operations were performed in Copenhagen starting in 1951.

In 2017, Denmark became the first country in the world to remove transgender identities from its list of mental health disorders.

=== France ===
Christine de Pisan makes one of the early accounts of gender transitioning in her autobiographical allegorical poem Le Livre de la mutation de fortune.

In the 16th-century, Mary de Vitry, a weaver who was born female, assumed a male identity and married a woman. He was soon discovered to have been born female, and after refusing to go back to his female identity, was executed.

The Chevalière d'Éon (1728–1810) was a French diplomat and soldier who appeared publicly as a man and pursued masculine occupations for 49 years, but during that time successfully infiltrated the court of Empress Elizabeth of Russia by presenting as a woman, and later promoted (and may have engineered) rumours that d'Éon had been assigned female at birth, and thereafter agreed with the French government to dress in women's clothing, doing so from 1777 until death. Doctors who examined d'Éon's body after death discovered "male organs in every respect perfectly formed", but also feminine characteristics; modern scholars think d'Éon may have been a trans woman and/or intersex.

Herculine Barbin (1838–1868) was a French intersex person assigned female at birth and raised as a girl. After a doctor's examination at age 22, Barbin was reassigned male, and legal papers followed declaring Barbin officially male. Barbin changed names to Abel Barbin and wrote memoirs using female pronouns for the period before transition, and male pronouns thereafter, which were recovered (following Barbin's suicide at age 30) and published in France in 1872 and in English in 1980. Judith Butler refers to Michel Foucault's commentary on Barbin in their book Gender Trouble.

Claude Cahun (born Lucy Renée Mathilde Schwob, 1894–1954) was surrealist photographer, sculptor, and writer who wrote that she was of neuter and fluid gender. She and her lifelong partner Marcel Moore (born Suzanne Alberte Malherbe) both adopted male pseudonyms when they started their artistic career. (Note: Although Claude is a gender-neutral name, feminine use was marginal before the 1920s and masculine use has remained predominant since.) Cahun's photography repeatedly blurred gender presentation and challenged gendered expectations.

Coccinelle (Jacqueline Charlotte Dufresnoy, 1931–2006) was a French actress, entertainer, and singer who made her debut as a transgender showgirl in 1953, and became the first person widely publicized as getting gender reassignment surgery in post-war Europe, where she became an international celebrity and a renowned club singer. Coccinelle worked extensively as an activist on behalf of transgender people in later life, founding the organization "Devenir Femme" ("To Become Woman").

In March 2020, Tilloy-lez-Marchiennes elected—and in May, inaugurated—Marie Cau as mayor, making her the first openly transgender mayor in France.

=== Germany ===
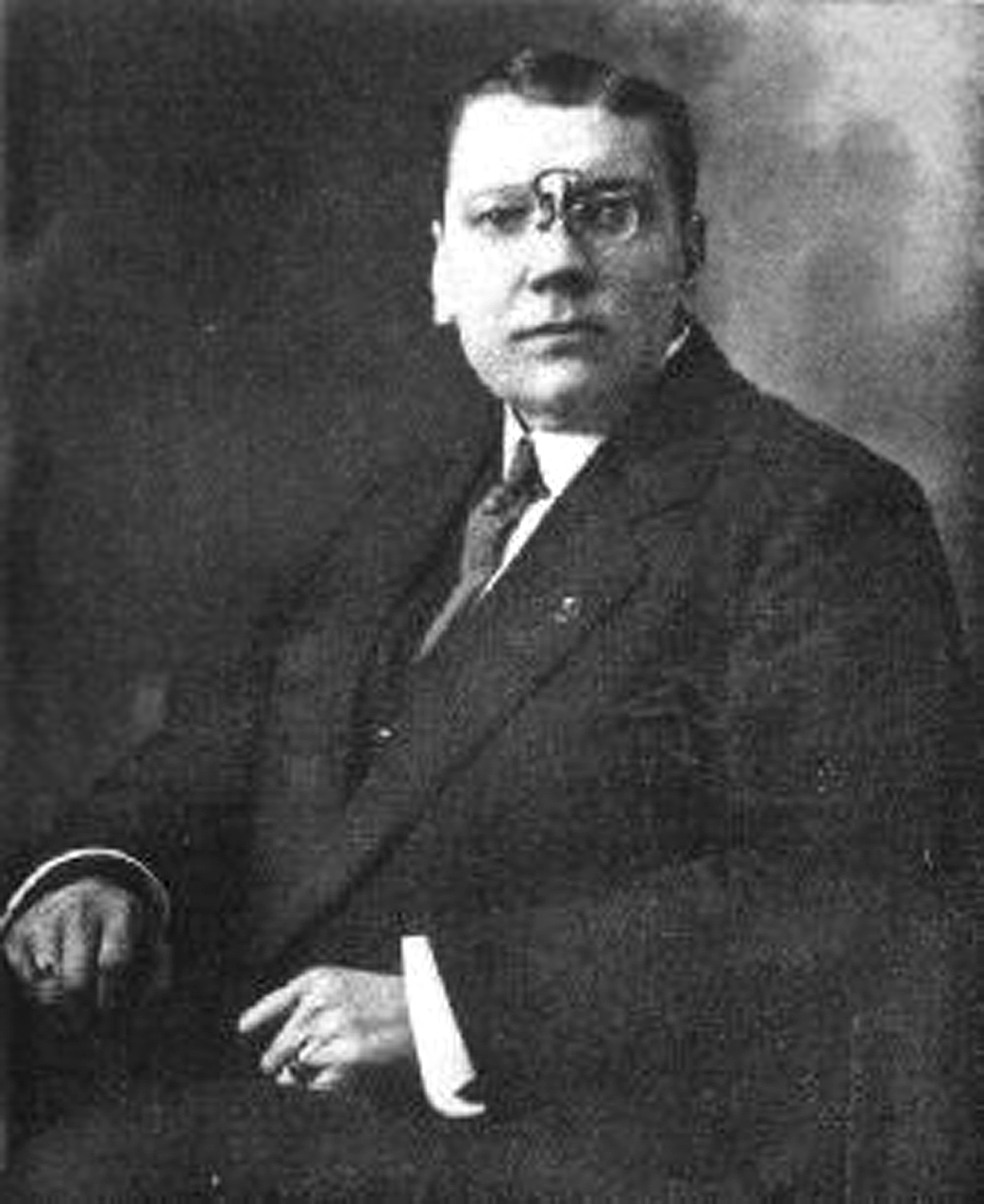
Anna P, who lived for many years as a man, photographed for Magnus Hirschfeld's Jahrbuch für sexuelle Zwischenstufen in 1922.

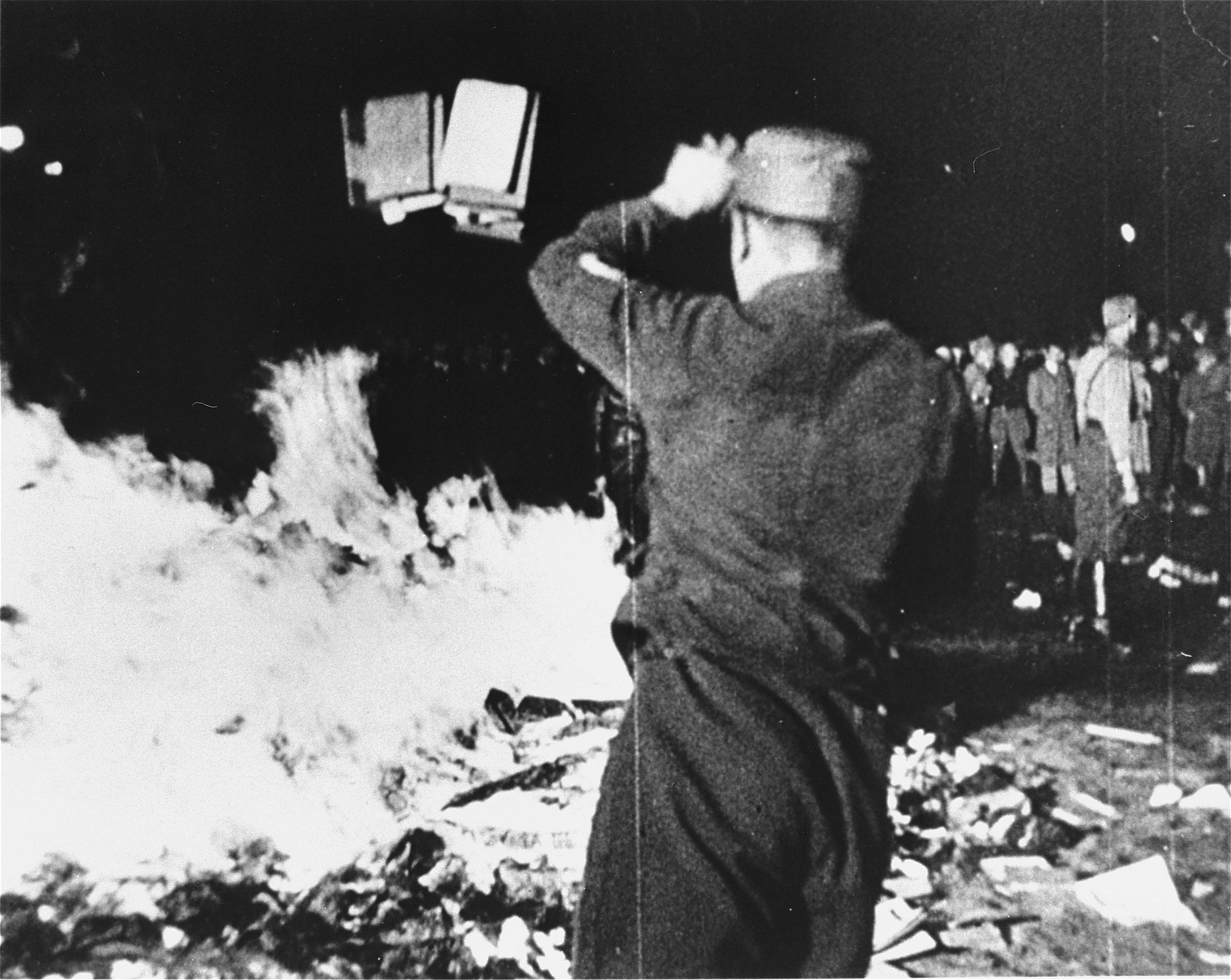
On May 10, 1933, Nazis burned the library of the Institut für Sexualwissenschaft.

An early reference to transgender people in the German medical literature appeared in 1829, in a brief review article by Johann Baptist Friedreich. This article was also republished in 1830. The article speculates on the causes behind a "female sickness" among Scythian priests, described by Hippocrates and later Herodotus; he compares this with transgender cases observed across various cultures. Friedreich's article was followed by a separate medical description that appeared in 1870.

In the early 1900s, transgender people became a subject of popular interest in Germany, covered by several biographies and the sympathetic liberal press in Berlin. In 1906, Karl M. Baer became one of the first known trans men to have sex reassignment surgery, and in 1907 gained full legal recognition of his gender with a new birth certificate, married his first wife, and published a semifictionalized autobiography, Aus eines Mannes Mädchenjahren ("Memoirs of a Man's Maiden Years"); in 1938, he emigrated to Palestine. The same year, Brazilian socialite Dina Alma de Paradeda moved to Breslau and became engaged to a male teacher, before committing suicide, after which a doctor revealed that her body was male. This made her one of the first trans women known by name in Central Europe or of South American origin. A biography published in 1907, Tagebuch einer männlichen Braut ("Diary of a male bride"), was supposedly based on her diary.

During the Weimar Republic, Berlin was a liberal city with one of the most active LGBT rights movements in the world. Magnus Hirschfeld co-founded the Scientific-Humanitarian Committee in Berlin and sought social recognition of homosexual and transgender men and women; with branches in several countries, the committee was (on a small scale) the first international LGBT organization. In 1919, Hirschfeld co-founded the Institut für Sexualwissenschaft, a sexology research institute with a research library, a large archive, and a marriage and sex counseling office. The institute was a worldwide pioneer in the call for civil rights and social acceptance for homosexual and transgender people. Hirschfeld coined the word transvestite. In 1930 and 1931, with Hirschfeld's (and other doctors') help, Dora Richter became the first known trans woman to undergo vaginoplasty, along with removal of the penis (following removal of testicles several years earlier), and Lili Elbe underwent similar surgeries in Dresden, including an unsuccessful ovary and uterus transplant, complications from which resulted in her death. In 1933, the Nazis burned the institute's library.

On June 12, 2003, the European Court of Human Rights ruled in favor of Van Kück, a German trans woman whose insurance company denied her reimbursement for sex reassignment surgery and hormone replacement therapy, who sued under Article 6 and Article 8 of the European Convention on Human Rights.

=== Italy ===
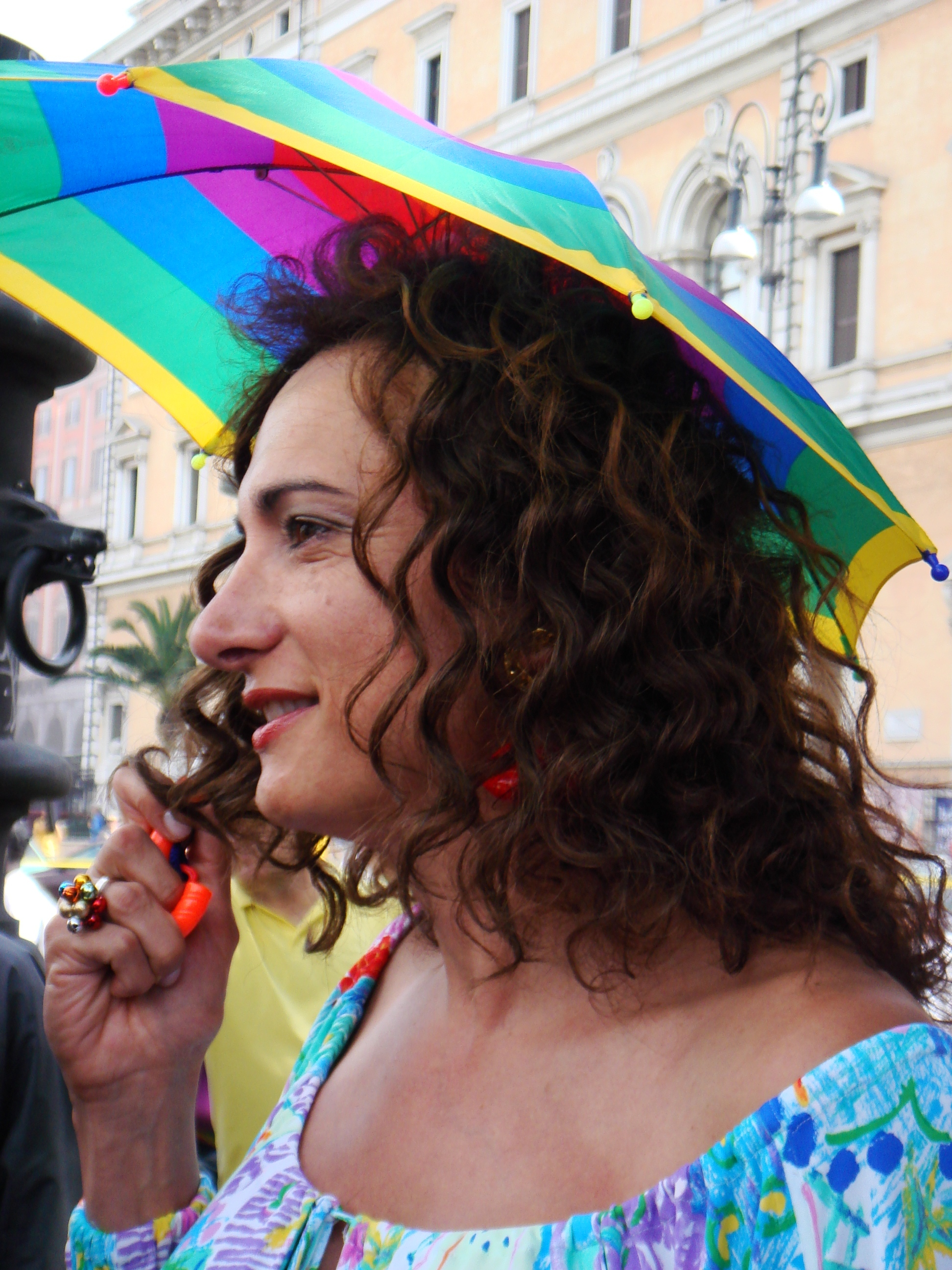
Vladimir Luxuria (2008)

Traditional Neapolitan culture recognized femminielli, a sort of third gender of male-assigned people with markedly feminine gender expression and an androphilic/homosexual orientation, who remain largely unstigmatized.

In 2006, Vladimir Luxuria became the first openly transgender woman elected to the Italian Parliament and the first transgender member of a European parliament.

In 2015, the Court of Cassation ruled that sterilization and sex reassignment surgery were not required to obtain a legal gender change.

=== The Netherlands ===
Maria van Antwerpen is typically considered a transgender or transsexual person by historians. van Antwerpen enlisted in the Dutch States Army and lived for many years as a man, marrying two women and being baptized as the father of their second wife. van Antwerpen's first marriage led to a criminal trial in 1751 on charges of bigamy.

=== Russia ===
After 2013—when the government passed a law against "promoting" "non-traditional relations"—Russia became "notoriously hostile" to transgender people. Dmitri Isaev's clinic, which provided medical authorization for half the sex reassignment surgeries, was forced to operate in secret. In 2019, a court in Saint Petersburg, Russia's most liberal city, ordered a business which had fired a woman when she transitioned to reinstate her.

==== Itelmens of Siberia ====
Among the Itelmens of Siberia, a third-gender category of the koekchuch was recorded in the 18th and 19th centuries, for people assigned male gender at birth who dressed as women.

=== Soviet Union ===
According to historians Dan Healey and Francesca Stella, scholarship on trans identities in the Soviet Union has been fragmentary, and that "a comprehensive history of the Soviet transsexual is needed."

Following the revolutions of 1917, LGBT rights in the Soviet Union expanded greatly, including a greater awareness of gender diversity. Nikolai Koltsov, director of the Institute of Experimental Biology, stated that there was "an infinite quantity of intermediate sexes", and Evgenii Fedorovich M., a State Political Directorate employee who had been born Evgeniia Fedorovna M. and who presented as a man, stated that "people live among us who do not fit neither the one nor the other gender" who "will begin to feel a sense of responsibility before society and become useful to it only when that society stops oppressing them and strangling them due to its lack of consciousness and its petty-bourgeois barbarity." In 1929, the People's Commissariat for Health organised a conference on "transvestites," including discussions about people seeking to change sexes and culminating in a resolution calling for same-sex marriage to be officially recognised. Much of the relative openness of the 1920s was reversed in the 1930s under Joseph Stalin, including the re-criminalisation of homosexuality in 1933.

In 1961, an interview with a trans woman was featured in the press, where she recounted the abuse she faced from doctors, including being diagnosed with paranoid schizophrenia and being physically beaten.

In 1968, in the Latvian Soviet Socialist Republic, surgeon Viktors Kalnbērzs, who had invented a penile implant that had already seen relatively widespread use in the Soviet Union and Europe to treat erectile dysfunction, was approached by a trans man about sex reassignment surgery. After the patient underwent consultations with several specialists, including an endocrinologist and a psychiatrist, Kalnberz obtained authorisation from the Latvian Ministry of Health to perform the surgery between 1970 and 1972. Kalnberz's actions were subsequently reviewed by a special committee, which found the operation had been medically necessary, but he was formally reprimanded by the Soviet Ministry of Health.

=== Spain ===
There are records of several 16th-century people in Spain who were raised as girls and subsequently adopted male identities under various circumstances, who some historians think were transgender, including Eleno de Céspedes and Antonio de Erauso.

During the Franco era, thousands of trans women and gay men were jailed, and today they fight for compensation. In 2007, a law took effect allowing trans people to change gender markers in documents such as birth certificates and passports without undergoing sterilization and sex reassignment surgery.

=== Turkey ===
Bülent Ersoy, a Turkish singer who was assigned male at birth, had a gender reassignment surgery in April 1981. Rüzgar Erkoçlar, a Turkish actor who was assigned female at birth, came out as a trans in February 2013.

=== United Kingdom ===
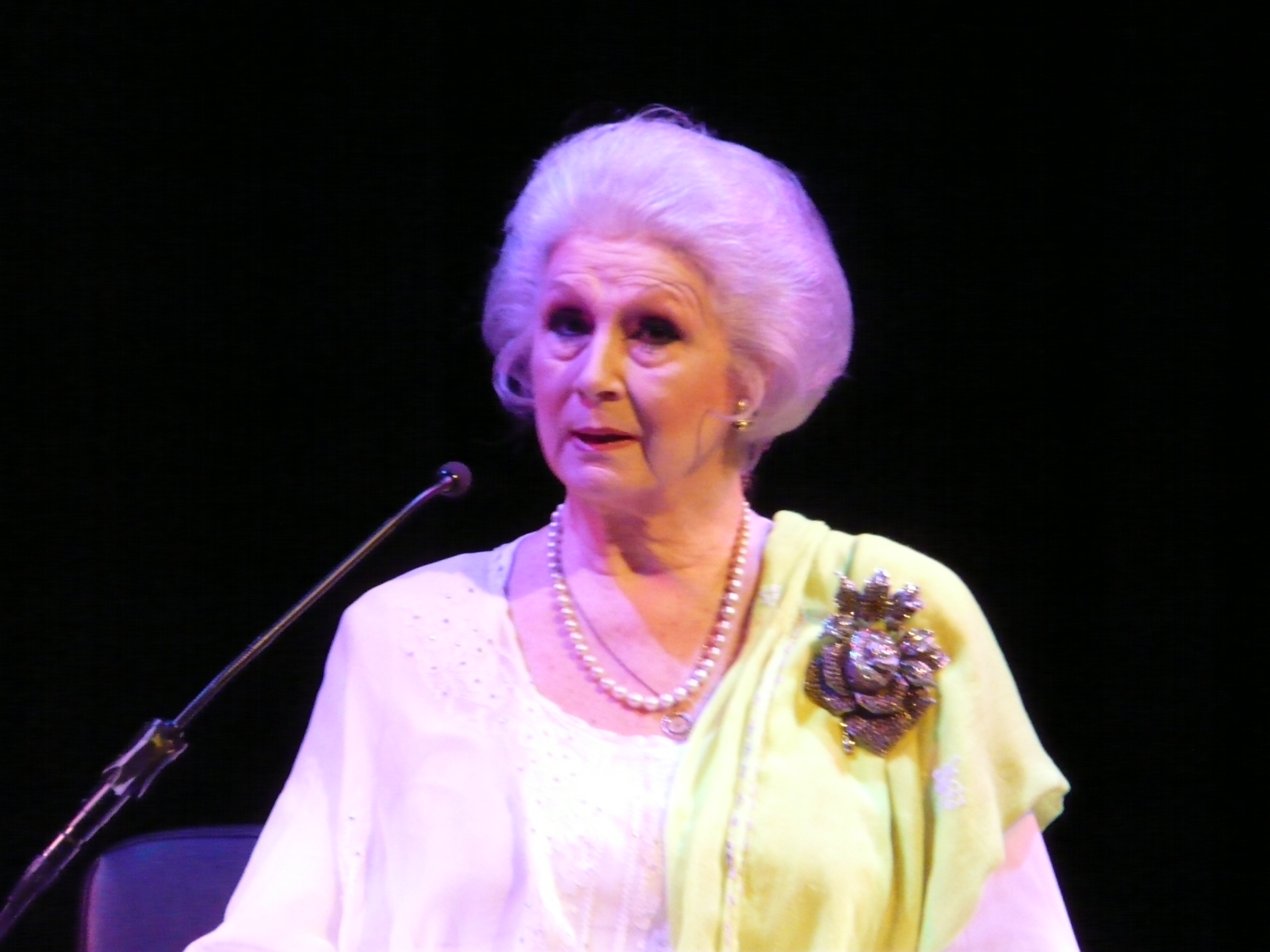
April Ashley in 2009

Irish-born surgeon James Barry had a long career as a surgeon and rose to the second-highest medical office in the British Army, improving conditions for wounded soldiers and the inhabitants of Cape Town, South Africa, and performing one of the first caesarean sections by a European doctor in which both the mother and child survived. Barry was assigned female at birth, but deliberately lived as a man for the majority of his life.

In 1946, the first sex-reassignment phalloplasty was performed by one British surgeon on another, Harold Gillies on Michael Dillon (an earlier phalloplasty was done on a cisgender man in 1936 in Russia).

Roberta Cowell, a former fighter pilot in World War II, was the first known trans woman to have undergone gender-affirming surgery the UK, in 1951.

In 1961, English model April Ashley was outed as transgender. She is one of the earliest Britons known to have had sex reassignment surgery, and was made a Member of the Order of the British Empire (MBE) in 2012 for promoting trans equality.

In 2004, the Gender Recognition Act passed, giving transgender people legal recognition of their gender before the law subject to certain conditions.

== Oceania ==
=== Australia ===
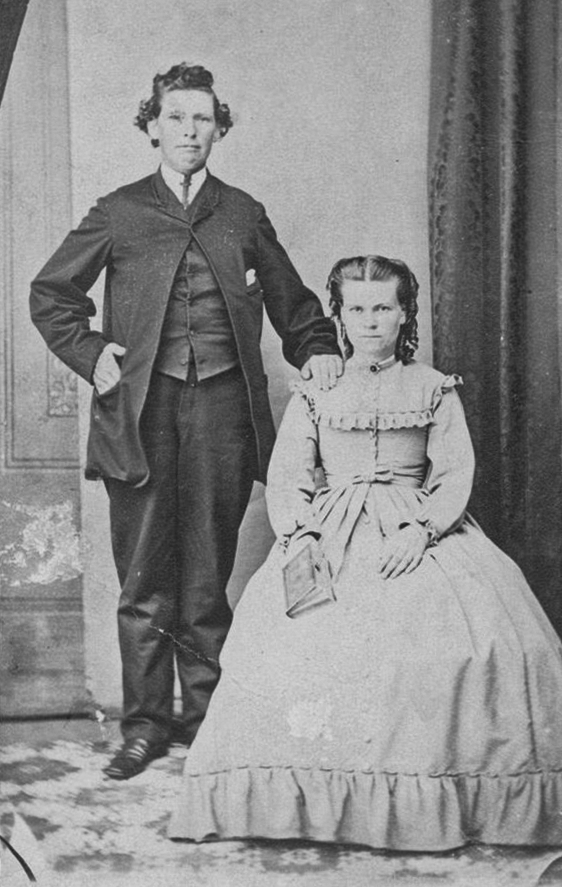
Transgender man Edward De Lacy Evans (left) with his third wife, Julia Marquand, c. 1870s.

Edward de Lacy Evans (1830–1901) was a servant, blacksmith, and coal miner who publicly identified as male for the majority of his life, was registered as the father of his son, and referred to as "Dadds" and "Uncle" by his family members. He was inducted into various mental health asylums, such as Kew Lunatic Asylum, in attempts to "cure" his trans male identity. Evans made international news in 1879 when it was discovered he was assigned female at birth. Circa 1880, he made his identity publicly known, performing in the Melbourne Waxworks under the tagline "The Wonderful Male Impersonator" and in Sydney as "The Man-Woman Mystery".

The first reported case of an Australian undertaking a sex change operation was an ex-RAAF Staff Sergeant Robert James Brooks in February 1956.

The Gender Dysphoria Clinic at Queen Victoria Hospital, Melbourne was established by Dr Trudy Kennedy and Dr Herbert Bower in 1975. It moved to Monash Medical Centre in 1989 and closed in 2009.

Australia's first transgender rights and advocacy organizations were established in 1979: the Melbourne-based Victorian Transsexual Coalition and the Victorian Transsexual Association; followed in 1981 by the Sydney-based Australian Transsexual Association, which included prominent activist, academic, and author Roberta Perkins.

=== New Zealand, the Cook Islands, Niue ===
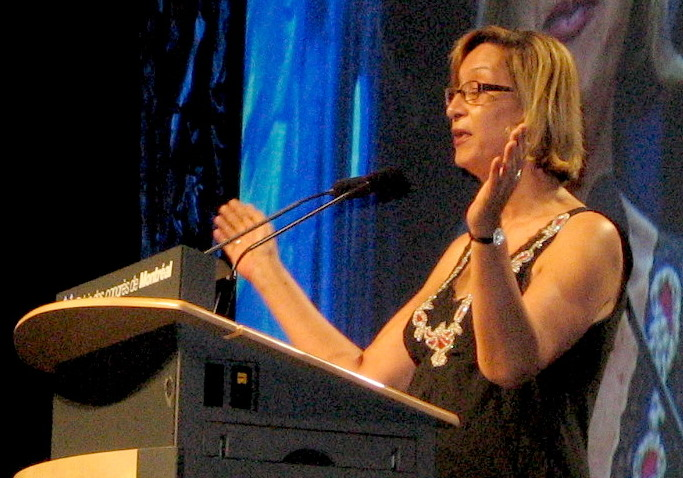
New Zealand politician Georgina Beyer in 2006

In 1995, Georgina Beyer became the first openly trans mayor in the world when Carterton, New Zealand elected her, and in 1999, she became the first transgender member of a parliament, winning election to represent Wairarapa; in 2003, the former sex worker helped pass the Prostitution Reform Bill decriminalizing sex work.

Some Māori use the terms whakawahine ("like a woman"), tangata ira tāne ("human man") to refer to trans-woman- and trans-man-like categories. The related term fakafifine denotes male-assigned people in Niue who fulfill a feminine third gender. Similarly, in the Cook Islands, akava'ine is a Cook Islands Māori (Rarotongan) word which, due to cross-cultural contact with other Polynesians living in New Zealand (especially the Samoan fa'afafine), has been used since the 2000s to refer to transgender people of Māori descent from the Cook Islands.

=== Samoa, Tonga, Fiji, and Tahiti ===
In Samoa, the fa'afafine ("in the manner of women") are a third gender with uncertain origins which go back at least to the beginning of the twentieth century. Fa'afafine are assigned male at birth, and express both masculine and feminine gender traits, performing a role otherwise performed by women. The word fa'atamaloa is sometimes used for a trans-male or tomboyish gender category or role.

In Tonga, the related term fakafefine or more commonly fakaleiti ("in the manner of ladies") denotes male-assigned people who dress and work as women and may partner with men, and call themselves leiti ("ladies"). They are common—one of the children of former king Taufa'ahau Tupou IV (d. 2006) is a leiti—and still held in high regard, though colonization and westernization have introduced some transphobia.

In Fiji, vakasalewalewa (also written vaka sa lewa lewa) are male-assigned people who perform roles usually carried out by women. In Tahiti, the rae rae fulfil a similar role.

== See also ==
- Digital Transgender Archive
- International Transgender Day of Visibility
- Intersex people in history
- LGBTQ history
- Transgender History (book)
- Timeline of LGBTQ history
- Timeline of transgender history
- Transgender legal history in the United States
- Transgender rights
- Transgender studies
- History of cross-dressing
