= Ralph Kerwineo =

Gender non-conforming American

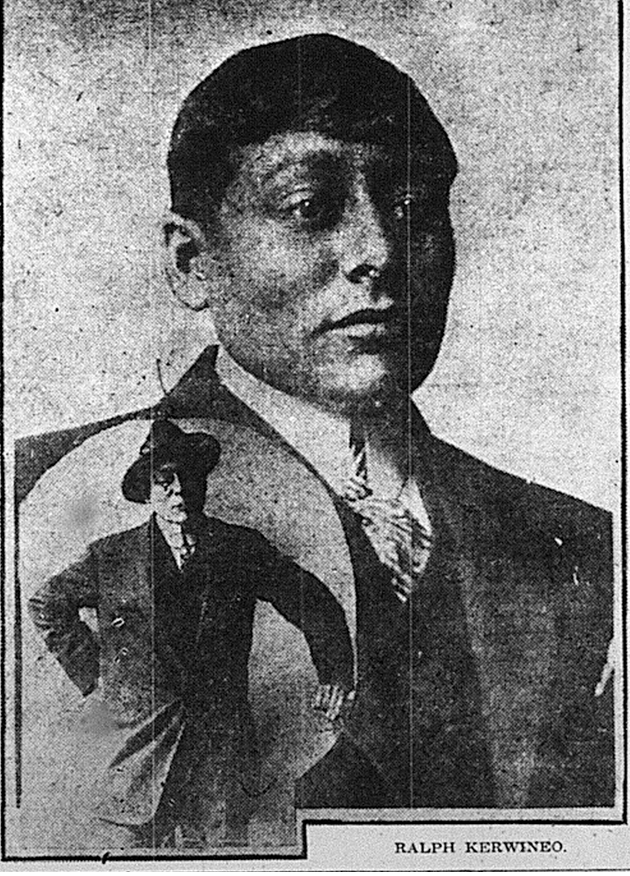
Ralph Kerwineo in 1914

Ralph Kerwineo (April 1876 – 1932) was an American who became notable after a 1914 incident in which Mamie White, the woman who had lived as Kerwineo's wife for over ten years, revealed to the local police Kerwineo's "true sex" (female). It was supposedly in retaliation to a legal marriage of Kerwineo and twenty-one-year-old Dorothy Kleinowski, and resulted in a police arrest and trial for disorderly conduct. The Milwaukee press followed the case with keen interest, however this local coverage did not pathologize Kerwineo, but preferred to describe a story of an upstanding citizen who donned male dress to support female partners. All charges were ultimately dropped.

== Life ==
Kerwineo was born (as Cora Anderson) in April 1876 in Kendallville, Indiana. The Andersons were the only people of color living in a small town of 2164 people, with Kerwineo's father being African American, and mother, Frances Anderson, being at least part Native American according to some reports (according to Mamie White, Potawatomie-Cherokee).

By 1900, Kerwineo (then twenty-four and still living as Cora Anderson) had moved to Chicago. Living in a boardinghouse on the city's South Side, Kerwineo met an African American woman, Mamie White, and they were living together as a pair in 1904. Around 1906, they decided to move out of Chicago and begin a new life together in Milwaukee, living as husband and wife.

In Milwaukee, Kerwineo consistently presented as being South American (often Bolivian) of Spanish ancestry. It appears claiming an identity as an immigrant was deliberate and enabled Kerwineo to use racial ambiguity to blend into Milwaukee racial makeup consisting of a very small black population, but with a large portion of immigrants who were considered "not quite white" but were better positioned socioeconomically than the city's African Americans. This can be traced in censuses—the 1880 and 1900 federal censuses marked Kerwineo (as Cora Anderson) as black, the 1910 federal census marks "Ralph Kerwinies" (reportedly born in Spain) as white. Kerwineo was able to rent a home in the city's tenth ward—a neighborhood populated by mostly native whites—and work as a clerk for the Cutler-Hammer company, at a time when the majority of the city's black men worked as domestic servants.

=== The 1914 trial ===
Five months prior to Kerwineo's arrest, Wisconsin's "Eugenic Marriage Law" had gone into effect, requiring all males to undergo a medical examination for venereal diseases prior to obtaining a marriage license, and Kerwineo passed the examination to legally marry twenty-one-year-old Dorothy Kleinowski, daughter of Polish immigrants, on March 24, 1914. In May 1914, Mamie White, who had lived as Kerwineo's wife for over ten years, revealed to the local police Kerwineo's "true sex". It was supposedly in retaliation to the marriage with Kleinowski, and resulted in a police arrest and trial for disorderly conduct.

The Milwaukee press followed the case with keen interest, publishing interviews with Kerwineo, White, Kleinowski, former employers, neighbors, and coworkers. They initially focused on establishing Kerwineo's "true" identity, involving "true sex", nationality and racial identity. As the arrest happened during the Mexican Revolution and American occupation of Vera Cruz, White and Kerwineo were both quick to disavow Kerwineo's previous claims to a South American identity and even later attempted to retain their distance from blackness by focusing on the Native American heritage.

The Milwaukee Journal, Sentinel and Evening Wisconsin each accepted White's explanation that with racism and sexism finding a job for a woman of color was hard, and it justified Kerwineo's decision to dress as a man to find gainful employment. Moreover, the local press did not pathologize Kerwineo, but followed this explanation and continued to write about an upstanding citizen happening to don the male dress. The Journal, Sentinel, and Evening Wisconsin each published extensive testimony from Kerwineo and individuals speaking on Kerwineo's behalf. The Sentinel described Kerwineo's testimony: "Answering questions put to her quietly and with the dignity of a refined, well-bred woman, the girl-man told the judge why she donned male attire. She said it was for the purpose of leading a clean life and to better herself financially." The newspaper quoted Kerwineo's view on their own gender and identity: "I had really become a man and imagined that the woman in me had perished with my years of change. ... We will pass over that part of my life where I became infatuated with another woman and married her. But in that raising let me state that I had come to love this woman as only a man can. Please remember now that I was harsh and hardened, that I took my adopted sex's view of life utterly and without question. My woman's soul had died and the man's had taken its place."

Milwaukee police captain Sullivan told the Milwaukee Journal: "No woman ever came into my office who could use better English, or was apparently more refined than 'Mrs. Kerwineo,' and from my investigation, I believe that they are stating the truth when they say the only reason they set out upon this adventure was an economical one. They are not morally perverted in any way. I am convinced." Having satisfied dominant expectations for leading a "good life," Judge G. E. Page suspended the sentence and allowed Kerwineo to leave free of charge.

When the charges were ultimately dropped, the Evening Wisconsin stated that Judge Page was convinced that Kerwineo "adopted the disguise for moral and financial reasons and led an exemplary life while posing as a man, had never made overtures to others to do wrong and had innocently induced Miss Klienowski into a mock marriage."

In the national lens, Kerwineo was not portrayed as a productive citizen, but rather as a social outcast. Reporters of national newspapers preferred to report told Kerwineo's story not in relation to the Milwaukee community and its reactions, but in relation to national debates, such as the one brewing over eugenics.

== In academia ==
Kerwineo's story has been a subject of analysis in modern academia, particularly via a gender studies and queer theory lens. Before that, many scholars have followed Jonathan Katz's lead in characterizing Kerwineo as a "passing woman," as Katz did in his landmark 1976 text Gay American History: Lesbians and Gay Men in the U.S.A. The anthropologist and trans studies scholar Jason Cromwell, who categorizes historical women who lived as men into three categories ("(1) those who did so for a short-term gain or adventure; (2) those who did so for love; and (3) those who identified as men."), lists Kerwineo under category 2, based on the explanations found in the period Milwaukee press, though Kerwineo's identity continues to be debated in academic circles.

Kerwineo has been a subject of Emily Skidmore's paper "Ralph Kerwineo's Queer Body: Narrating The Scales of Social Membership in the Early Twentieth Century", published in GLQ in 2014, and was one of the historical figures analyzed in her book, True Sex: The Lives of Trans Men at the Turn of the Twentieth Century.
