= Digital Transgender Archive =

American online archive

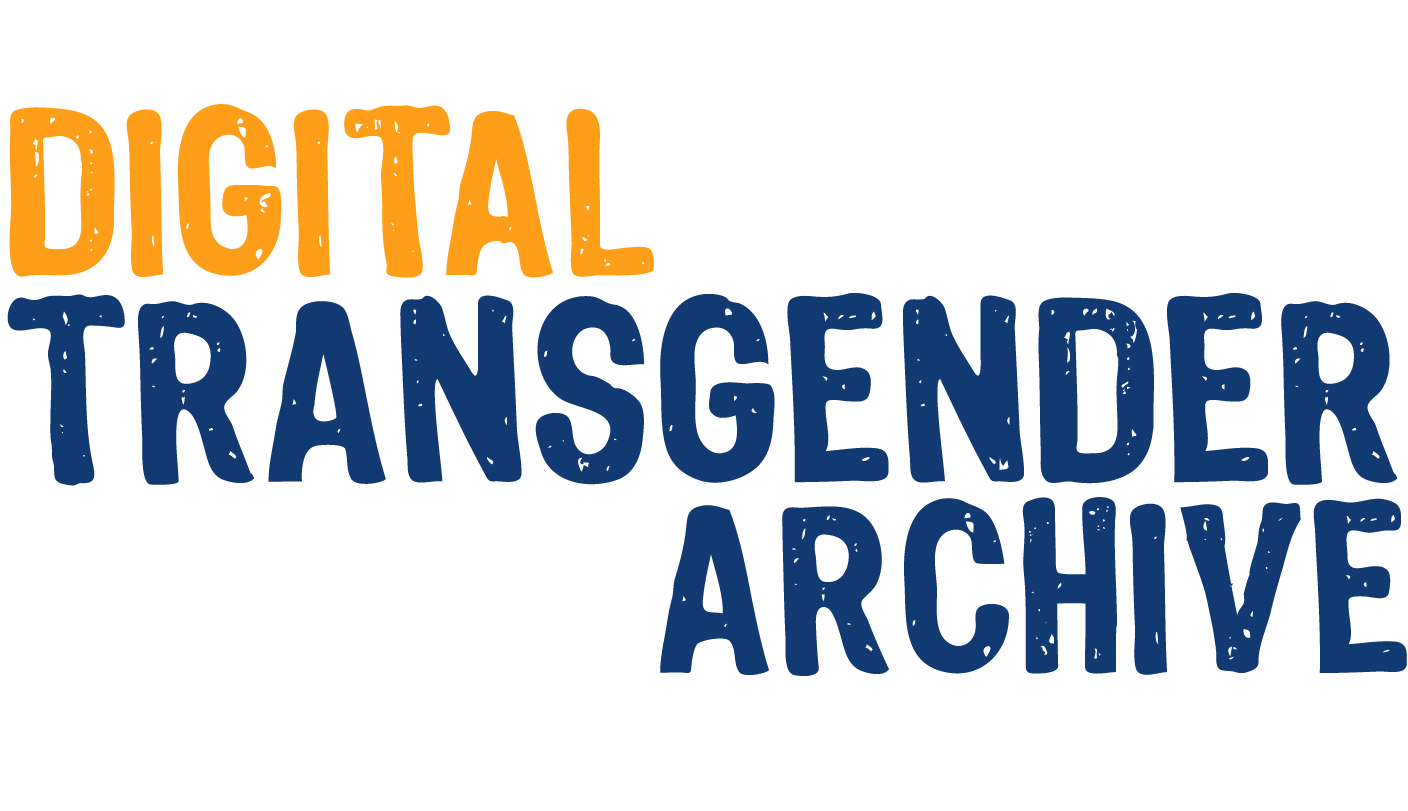
Digital Transgender Archive logo

The Digital Transgender Archive (DTA) is an online archive and finding aid for transgender-related materials in digital and physical collections. It provides a single search engine for researchers to locate and use materials from more than sixty international colleges, universities, nonprofit organizations, and private collections, including materials hosted by the DTA itself.

== Contents ==
The DTA includes born-digital materials, digitized historical materials, and non-digital archives, with a focus on "non-normative gender practices" before the year 2000. The DTA co-locates and provides direct access or links to materials from numerous institutions including The ArQuives, GLBT Historical Society, Leather Archives & Museum, Transgender Oral History Project, University of Wisconsin–Milwaukee, and ONE National Gay & Lesbian Archives. The DTA applies its own metadata schema to all items. The items include newsletters, periodicals, photographs, and zines.

== Origins ==
Planning for the archive began in 2008. The resource was developed in response to several challenges in conducting research on transgender history. Materials documenting transgender history are widely dispersed, and the level of description and access for materials varies widely. Because the term "transgender" is relatively new, materials processed in archives prior to the 1990s may not contain the now widely accepted descriptive term. The DTA makes available materials that were previously unavailable online or difficult to find in archival collections.

== Recognition ==
In 2017, the DTA received the C.F.W. Coker Award for Archival Description from the Society of American Archivists.

== See also ==
- Transgender history
- Transgender rights movement
