= Frank Woodhull =

Canadian-born immigrant

- Born: Mary Johnson c. 1858; Canada
- Died: after 1908
- Known for: Gender expression

Frank Woodhull (c. 1858 – after 1908), born Mary Johnson, was a Canadian-born immigrant to the United States who is known for adopting a male identity for over 15 years, which was discovered in 1908 during processing at Ellis Island. This has led to some contemporary speculation that Woodhull was a transgender man.

== Early life ==
All that is known about Woodhull's early life comes from interviews of him, where he states he is around 50 years old and was born in Canada to parents of English origin. Some sources without citation claim he was born in Toronto, Ontario. After his father died around 1878, he immigrated to the United States and lived for around 15 years as a woman, describing these years as "hard."

== Identity change ==
Around 1893 and by this time living in California, Woodhull began identifying as a man. In an interview with The New York Times, he attributed this to a desire for social mobility and his masculine physical appearance. He worked various jobs presenting as a man from this period up to 1908.

== Ellis Island and discovery ==
Around August 1908, Woodhull went on holiday to England. Woodhull left from Southampton on the SS City of New York on September 26 and arrived in New York on October 4. Due to his not being naturalized, he was subject to routine Ellis Island processing. After an official asked to screen him for tuberculosis, he is alleged to have said, "Oh, please don't examine me! I might as well tell you all. I am a woman, and have traveled in male attire for fifteen years." On October 6, Woodhull was ruled by the Ellis Island Board of Special Inquiry to be a "desirable immigrant [who] should be allowed to win her livelihood as she [sic] saw fit."

== After discovery ==
Nothing is conclusively known about Woodhull's life after 1908. In the aforementioned interview, Woodhull claimed he planned to seek work in New Orleans and did not plan to naturalize due to his assigned sex. Some publications claim he naturalized and died in 1938 in New Orleans without sourcing. Others speculate that he adopted a new identity to avoid public attention.
