= Joseph Lobdell =

19th century transgender man

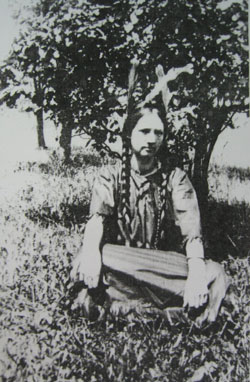
- Lobdell in braids, beads, and feathers, c. 1853
- Born: December 2, 1829; Westerlo, New York, U.S.
- Died: May 28, 1912 (aged 82); Binghamton State Hospital, New York, United States
- Other name: Joe Lobdell
- Spouses: George Washington Slater; Marie Louise Perry

Joseph Israel Lobdell (December 2, 1829 – May 28, 1912) was an American hunter and fiddler usually characterized as a transgender man. Lobdell was the subject of frequent negative media attention within his lifetime, which characterized his gender nonconformity as a form of insanity; an 1877 New York Times article referred to Lobdell's life as "one of the most singular family histories ever recorded". In later life, he was the subject of an early medical case study regarded as "the first United States to describe a person who would today be understood as transgender." Writer William Klaber wrote an historical novel, which was based on Lobdell's life. An 1883 account by P. M. Wise, which cast Lobdell as a "lesbian", was the first use of that word in an American publication.

== Life ==
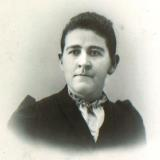
Joseph Lobdell in later years

Joseph Lobdell was born December 2, 1829, to a working-class family living in Westerlo, Albany County, New York. Lobdell married George Washington Slater, who was reportedly mentally abusive and abandoned Lobdell shortly after the birth of their daughter, Helen. Lobdell was known for marksmanship and nicknamed "The Female Hunter of Delaware County". Lobdell wrote a memoir about their hunting adventures, their disastrous marriage and their feelings about God, ending with a plea for equal employment for women. Lobdell was also known to be an accomplished fiddle player and opened a singing school for a time. While working at the singing school, Lobdell became engaged to a young woman. A rival for her affection learned Lobdell was female and threatened to tar and feather Lobdell. Lobdell's fiancée warned Lobdell, who escaped. Lobdell received a Civil War pension when Slater was killed in the war. Lobdell entered the County Poor House in Delhi, New York, in 1860, where Lobdell met Marie Louise Perry. Perry was a poor but well-educated woman, whose husband left her shortly after they eloped. Lobdell later married Perry in 1861 in Wayne County, Pennsylvania. They spent years roaming the woods together with their pet bear, living in nomadic poverty, surviving off hunting, gathering and charity. Then they were arrested for vagrancy and sent to Stroudsburg jail where "discovery that the supposed man was a woman was made". Joseph was later arrested again for wearing male clothes. Marie wrote a letter using a stick and pokeberry ink begging the jail to free her husband.

In 1879, Lobdell was taken away to the Willard Insane Asylum in Ovid, New York. While in the asylum, Lobdell became a patient of Dr. P. M. Wise, who published a brief article, "A Case of Sexual Perversion", in which the doctor noted Lobdell said "she [sic] considered herself a man in all that the name implies". Newspapers published two premature obituaries for Lobdell, first in 1879, then in 1885. Lobdell was presumed to have died on May 28, 1912.

== See also ==
- Harry Allen (1882–1922), American transgender man featured in sensationalist 20th-century newspaper coverage
