= 俊 =

俊 or 준, meaning 'handsome', may refer to:

- Joon, Chinese given name
- Joon, Korean surname and given name
- Shun, Japanese given name
- Takashi, Japanese given name

== See also ==
- Joon (disambiguation)
- Jun (disambiguation)
- Shun (disambiguation)
