= Joon =

Joon may refer to:

- Joon (airline), a former French leisure airline based in Paris
- Joon (Chinese name)
- Joon (Korean name)
- Joon Wolfsberg, German singer and songwriter
- Pieter Joon, Dutch businessman, founded the World Organization Volleyball for Disabled
- Rajiv Kumar Joon, Indian Army officer, received the Ashoka Chakra award
- Joon, a character in the film Benny & Joon
- Joon Yorigami, a character from Antinomy of Common Flowers in the Touhou Project series

== See also ==
- Jun (disambiguation)
- June (disambiguation)
- 俊 (disambiguation)
