= June (surname) =

June is a surname. Notable people with the surname include:

- Cato June (born 1979), American former National Football League player
- Jennie June (autobiographer) (1874–?), one of the earliest transgender individuals to publish an autobiography in the United States
- John June (fl. 1740–1770), English engraver
- Ray June (1895–1958), American Hollywood cinematographer

== See also ==
- June (given name)
- June (Basque given name)
- June (disambiguation)
