= June (disambiguation) =

June is the sixth month of the year.

June may also refer to:

== People ==
- June (Basque given name), a Basque female given name
- June (given name), including a list of people and fictional characters with the name
- June (singer) (born 1987), Korean R&B singer performing in Japan
- June (surname)
- Jacky June (1924–2012), Belgian musician born Jean-Jacques Junne
- Gilberto García Mena (born 1954), Mexican drug lord, nicknamed El June
- Junlper (born 1995), a transfeminine Twitter/X shitposter also known as "June"

== Places ==
- June, Alberta, Canada
- June, Missouri, United States
- June Lake (disambiguation)
- June Mountain, a winter resort in northern California, United States
- June Island, an island in the Debenham Islands, Antarctica

== Arts, entertainment, and media ==
=== Films ===
- June, a 2004 television film starring Felicia Day
- June, a 2015 horror film starring Casper Van Dien
- June (2019 film), a Malayalam film
- June (2021 film), a Marathi film

=== Music ===
- June (Illinois band), a rock band from Chicago
- June (North Carolina band), an American rock band
- June (Polish band)
- "June", a song by Destroyer from the 2022 album Labyrinthitis
- "June", a song by Florence and the Machine from the 2018 album High as Hope
- "June", a song by Prince from the 2015 album Hit n Run Phase One
- "June", a song by Spock's Beard on the 1998 album The Kindness of Strangers
- "June", a song by The Church from the 1993 album Forget Yourself

=== Other arts, entertainment, and media ===
- June (magazine) (ジュネ), a Japanese magazine
- June, an alternative name for yaoi (boys' love (BL), or ボーイズ ラブ, or bōizu rabu), a genre of fictional media
- June, a character on Fear the Walking Dead
- "June" (The Handmaid's Tale episode)

== Other uses ==
- June (company), an American home automation company
- June (TV channel), France

== See also ==
- June beetle, the common name for several varieties of scarab beetles
- Ju-ne (born 1997), South Korean male singer and member of boy band iKon
- June bug (disambiguation)
- June List, a political organisation
- June Movement, a political organisation
- Joon (disambiguation)
- Junee, a small town in New South Wales, Australia
- Junie, a given name
