= June (given name) =

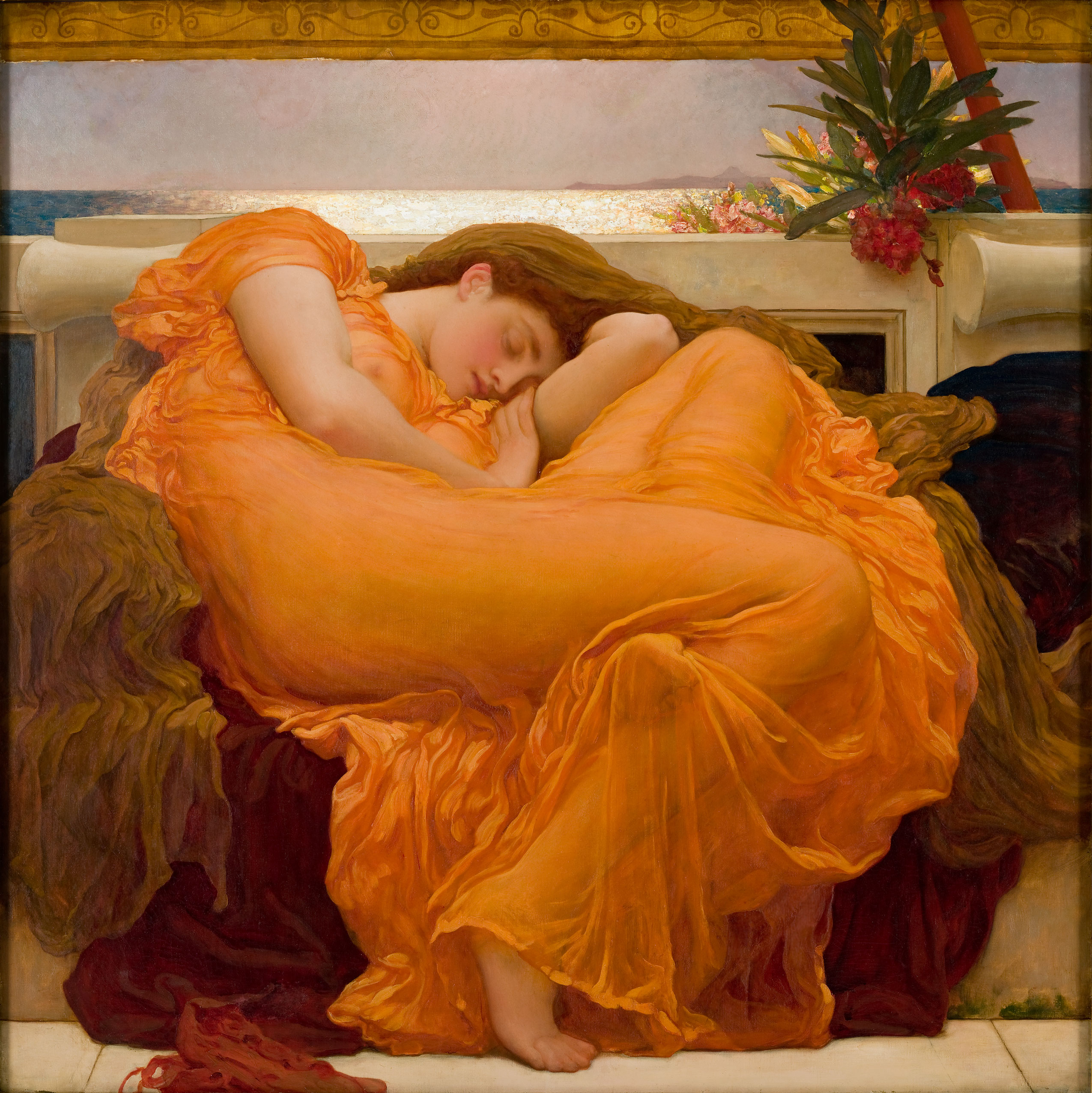
- Flaming June (1895) by Lord Leighton
- Gender: gender-neutral

Origin
- Origin: Latin

June is a gender-neutral given name. It is a common feminine name and a less common masculine name in English-speaking countries. It comes from the name of the month, which is derived from Juno, the name of a Roman goddess of youth and protection. Her name, derived from the Latin "Iūnō," stems from the root word for "young" (Iuuen), signifying vital energy and fertility. She was revered the queen of the gods and the goddess of love and marriage. June is also a short form of the names Juniper, Junia, Junius, and Junior.

June is also an unrelated Basque feminine name meaning "place of the reeds".

June was first used as a name in the United States during the 18th century. As a masculine name, it was most often either a hypocorism for Junius, a personal name derived from the Ancient Roman Junia gens, or from the name of the month. Women were also named after the month. It was a unisex name most commonly used for African American slaves and descendants of slaves in the Antebellum South during the 19th century. The name later came into use as a popular name for American girls, in part due to its similarity to other popular names such as Jane, Jean, and Joan. It increased in use for girls after 1910 and reached a peak in 1925 as the 39th most popular name. It then gradually declined until it dropped off the top 1000 list of names in 1987. In recent years, it has started to make a comeback: in 2024 it ranked 152. As a boy's name for American boys, June reached a peak in 1922 at 697th, but then also declined and left the top 1000 list in 1939. The name is also well-used for girls in Belgium, France, Netherlands, and the Basque Country in Spain during the 2020s.

== People named June include ==
=== Arts ===
- June Allyson (1917–2006), American film and television actress, popular in the 1940s and 1950s
- June Anderson (born 1952), American coloratura soprano
- June Arnold (1926–1982), American author and feminist activist
- June Berry (born 1924), English artist
- June Black (1910–2009), New Zealand ceramic artist and painter
- June Blair (1933–2022), American model and actress best known for being Playboy magazine's Playmate of the Month in January 1957
- June Brigman (born 1960), American comic book artist and illustrator
- June Bronhill (1929–2005), Australian soprano opera singer
- June Brown (1927–2022), English actress and author
- June Caprice (1895–1936), American silent film actress
- June Carter Cash (1929–2003), American singer, songwriter, actress, member of the Carter Family, wife of Johnny Cash
- June Chadwick (born 1951), English actress
- June Christy (1925–1990), American jazz singer popular in the 1950s
- June Cochran (1942–2004), American model and beauty queen
- June Collyer (1906–1968), American actress
- June Duprez (1918–1984), British film actress
- June Flewett (1927–2025), British theatre actress and director
- June Foray (1917–2017), American voice actress who has worked for most of the studios which produced animated films since the 1940s
- June Furlong (1930–2020), English model
- June Harding (1937–2019), American actress
- June Haver (1926–2005), American film actress
- June Havoc (1912–2010), American actress, dancer, writer and theater director
- June Hutton (1920–1973), American popular singer
- June James (producer) (born 1990), American music producer
- June Jordan (1936–2002), African-American bisexual political activist, writer, poet and teacher
- June Kenney (1933–2021), American B-movie actress
- June Lang (1915–2005), American film actress
- June Lockhart (1925–2025), American actress
- June Loney (1930–2016), Australian harpist
- June MacCloy (1909–2005), American actress in the 1930s and 1940s
- June Marlowe (Gisela Valaria Goetten) (1903–1984), American silent-film actress best known for the Our Gang series
- June Marlowe (Martha Jane Black) (born 1918–1919), American actress and singer best known for her roles in Argentine classical cinema
- June Mathis (1892–1927), American screenwriter and Hollywood executive in the 1920s
- June Millington (born 1948), American musician, songwriter, and producer; founded Fanny, the first all girl rock band signed to a major record label
- June Nixon (born 1942), Australian organist, choir trainer, and composer
- June Page, British actress
- June Palmer (1940–2004), aka June Power, model
- June Pointer (1953–2006), American singer, founding member of The Pointer Sisters
- June Salter (1932–2001), Australian actress
- June Sarpong (born 1977), British television presenter
- June Spencer (1919–2024), English actress and voice artist
- June Squibb (born 1929), American actress
- June Tabor (born 1947), English folk singer
- June Taylor (1918–2004), American choreographer
- June Thorburn (1931–1967), English actress
- June Tripp (1901–1985), sometimes known just as June, British actress
- June Tyson (1936–1992), American jazz singer
- June Vincent (1920–2008), American actress
- June Walker (1900–1966), American stage and film actress
- June Whitfield (1925–2018), English actress
- June Wilkinson (1940–2025), English model and actress

=== Sports ===
- June Croft (born 1963), British freestyle swimmer
- June Mar Fajardo (born 1989), Filipino basketball player
- June Ferguson (1928–2004), Australian sprinter and coach
- June Fulton, Botswanan lawn bowls player
- June James (American football) (1962–1990), American football linebacker
- June James (cricketer) (1925–1997), Australian cricket player
- June Jones (1953–2026), American football player and coach
- June Maston (1928–2004), Australian sprinter
- June Peppas (1929–2016), professional baseball player for the AAGPBL from 1948 to 1954

=== Others ===
- June Atkinson (born 1948), the North Carolina Superintendent of Public Instruction
- June Bacon-Bercey (1928–2019), American meteorologist
- June Callwood (1924–2007), Canadian journalist and social activist
- June Clark (nurse) (born 1941), Professor of Community Nursing at the University of Wales, Swansea
- June Cobb (1927–2015), American informant for the CIA
- June Dally-Watkins (1927–2020), Australian businesswoman, fashion-model and etiquette and deportment expert
- June Dobbs Butts (1928–2019), American educator and writer
- June Downey (1875–1932), American psychologist
- June Fletcher, American writer for The Wall Street Journal
- June Frazer (1936–2024), American politician
- June Gibbons (born 1963), one of two identical twins whose story is a curious case involving psychology and language
- June Trengereid Gruer (born 2000), Norwegian politician
- June Haimoff (1922–2022), English environmentalist
- June Jackson (1939–2019), New Zealand Māori activist and public servant
- June Lee, American physician and professor
- June Leonard (died 1994), American politician
- June Leow (born 1964), Malaysian politician
- June Lloyd, Baroness Lloyd of Highbury (1928–2006), British paediatrician and, in retirement, a cross bench member of the House of Lords
- June Lyne (1931–2019), American politician
- June McCarroll (1867–1954), American nurse (later a physician) who is credited with the idea of painting lines on highways to separate lanes
- June Miller (1902–1979), the second wife of Henry Miller
- June Mummery (born 1963/1964), British businesswoman and politician
- June Pallot (1953–2004), New Zealand professor of accounting and a registered architect
- June Rowlands (1924–2017), 60th mayor of Toronto, Ontario, and the first woman to hold that office
- June C. Smith (1875–1947), American jurist, Chief Justice of the Illinois Supreme Court
- June Westbury (1921–2004), Canadian politician

== Fictional characters ==
- June, a duckling in the Donald Duck Universe
- Chameleon June, in the Japanese manga series Saint Seiya
- June Cleaver, in the 1950s television series Leave It to Beaver
- June Slater, in the US soap opera Loving

== See also ==
- June (Basque given name)
