= Jonathan Boston =

New Zealand academic

Jonathan Boston ONZM
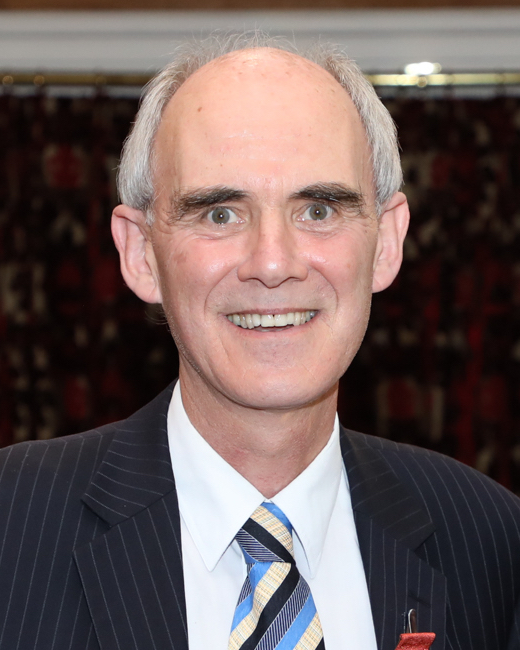
- Boston in 2021
- Born: 1957 (age 68–69)

Academic background
- Education: University of Canterbury; University of Oxford
- Thesis: The theory and practice of voluntary incomes policies with particular reference to the British Labour government's social contract, 1974–79 (1984)
- Doctoral advisor: Jim Sharpe; David Soskice

Academic work
- Discipline: Public policy
- Website: staff page

Jonathan George Boston ONZM (born 1957) is a New Zealand academic and professor of policy studies at the Victoria University of Wellington School of Government.

== Academic career ==
Boston got his MA from the University of Canterbury and his DPhil from the University of Oxford.

He was the co-chair of the Expert Advisory Group on Solutions to Child Poverty, and has written extensively on climate change policy.

In the 2021 New Year Honours, Boston was appointed an Officer of the New Zealand Order of Merit, for services to public and social policy.

== Selected works ==
- Boston, Jonathan, John Martin, June Pallot, and Pat Walsh. Public management: the New Zealand model. Auckland: Oxford University Press, 1996.
- Boston, Jonathan, John Martin, June Pallot, and Pat Walsh. "Reshaping the state: New Zealand’s bureaucratic revolution." Victoria University of Wellington Print (1991).
- Boston, Jonathan. "The theoretical underpinnings of public sector restructuring in New Zealand." Reshaping the state (1991): 1-26.
- Boston, Jonathan. The state under contract. Paul & Company Pub Consortium, 1995.
