= Shun =

Shun may refer to:

- Shunning, avoiding association with an individual or group
- Shun (given name), a masculine Japanese given name
- Seasonality (shun, 旬), in Japanese cuisine

== Emperor Shun ==
- Emperor Shun (舜; between c. 2294 and 2184 BC), a legendary leader of ancient China
- Emperor Shun of Han (順帝; 115–144), the Han emperor
- Emperor Shun of Liu Song (順帝; 467–479), the Southern emperor
- Li Zicheng (1606–1645), the sole member of the short-lived Shun Dynasty

== Other ==
- Shun Dynasty, dynasty established by Li Zicheng in 1644
- "Shun" (song), a 2009 song by musician Ringo Sheena.
- SHUN, an Internet Relay Chat command, used to prevent a user sending messages to a server's channels
- Shun Cutlery
- Shun (band), a music unit led by Susumu Hirasawa
  - SYUN, a label created by Hirasawa under DIW Records named after the group
- Shun, a boss character in the 2024 Nintendo Switch game Mario & Luigi: Brothership
- 俊 (disambiguation)
