= June Lake =

June Lake can refer to:

== Canada ==
- June Lake (Mackenzie Mountains), a lake in the Sekwi Range, Canada and site of several Elliptocephala species
- June Lake (Vancouver Island), a lake on British Columbia's Vancouver Island, Canada
- June Lake (Rainy River District), Ontario
- June Lake (Cochrane District), Ontario
- June Lake (Kenora District), Ontario
- June Lake (Algoma District), Ontario

== United States ==
- June Lake (Sharp County, Arkansas), a lake in Sharp County, Arkansas
- June Lake, California, a village in Mono County, U.S.
- June Lake (California), a lake next to the village, U.S.
- June Lake (Washington), a lake in the Alpine Lakes Wilderness, Washington, U.S.
- June Lake, lakes in Wisconsin in Iron County and Lincoln County
- June Lake, a lake in Marinette County, Wisconsin

== Other uses ==
- June Lake, a character in the 1938 American Western film The Frontiersmen

== See also ==
- June Lake Junction, California, an unincorporated community in Mono County
