= Jun =

Jun or JUN may refer to:

== People ==
- As a given name:
  - Jun, stage name of Lee Jun-young, South Korean singer and actor, member of the boy band U-KISS
  - Jun (Chinese entertainer), Chinese singer and actor, member of the Korean boy band Seventeen
  - Jun (given name), a common Japanese given name
  - Jun, form of the Korean given name Joon (Korean name)
- As a surname:
  - Tomáš Jun, Czech footballer
  - Jun, form of the Korean family name Jeon (Korean surname)
  - Jun, form of the Korean family name Joon (Korean name)
  - Jun, form of the Chinese given name Joon (Chinese name)
- Jun., abbreviation of Junior (suffix), epithet marking a younger person bearing an identical name

== Places ==
- Jun, Granada, Spain

== Science ==
- c-jun, a protein encoded by gene JUN

== Time ==
- Abbreviation of June
- A ten-day period in the Japanese calendar

== History ==
- Jun (郡) or commandery (China), an administrative division of imperial China
- Jun (軍, "army"), one of the administrative divisions of the Tang Empire

== Other ==
- Jun (drink), a Tibetan fermented tea drink
- JUN Auto, a Japanese car tuning shop
- 俊 (disambiguation)
