= Cercle Hermaphroditos =

Informal transgender advocacy organisation in the United States

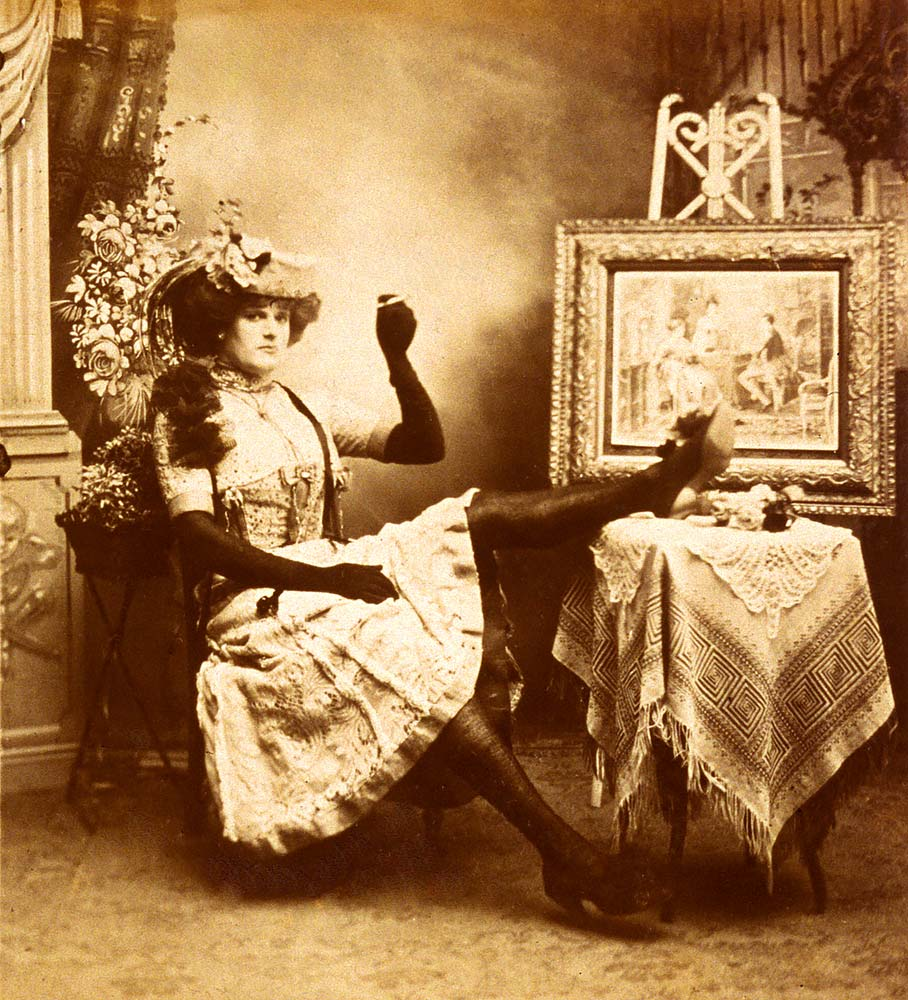
"Bowery Queen", ca. 1890s

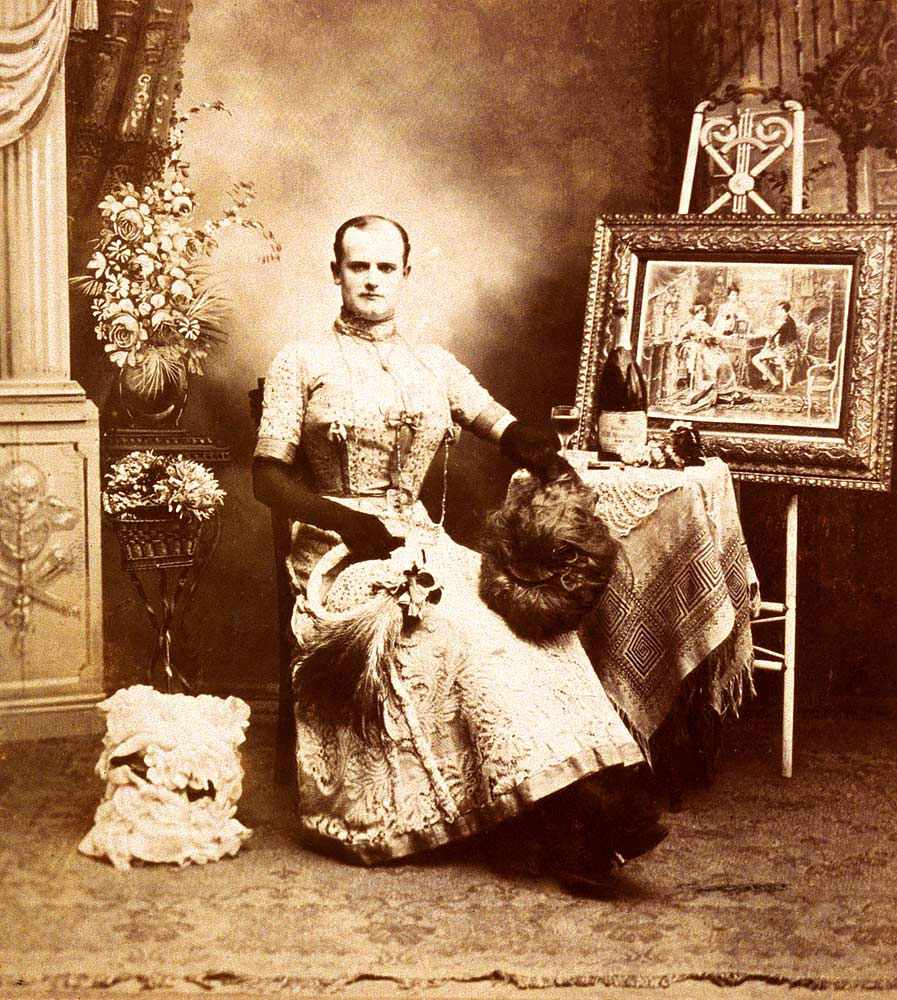
"Bowery Queen", ca. 1890s

The Cercle Hermaphroditos was the first known informal transgender advocacy organisation in the United States, founded in 1895 in New York City "to unite for defense against the world’s bitter persecution". The group first met at Paresis Hall, also called Columbia Hall or simply "the Hall," which was a center of homosexual nightlife in New York City. There, male sex workers would solicit men under an effeminate persona.

In a time when cross dressing was socially unacceptable and a punishable crime, places like Paresis Hall provided a place where self-described "instinctive female-impersonators," androgynes, queens, fairies, or Uranians could gather and feel more free to express themselves and socialize with similar people. These were Victorian era and Edwardian era words – with their own nuances of meaning – for people who were born male, felt they were at least partly women in mind or spirit, and preferred having sex with men; people who today might call themselves transgender women, non-binary people, or feminine gay men, in the language of today's LGBT communities.

The nature of Paresis Hall during this period is known to historians today from a variety of sources. However, the Cercle Hermaphroditos is more apocryphal, known chiefly from the autobiography of an "instinctive female-impersonator," Jennie June, who provides the main surviving description of it. June says all the group's members knew one another only by pseudonyms, for reasons of safety. Additionally, June also stated that the majority of the group were Ultra-Androgyne, & would always clothe themselves as female in their daily lives if the law permitted it. The group was led by pseudonymous Roland Reeves. Little evidence of the Cercle's existence is known to survive today, outside of June's autobiography. If it issued any pamphlets, none are yet known to historians. For this reason, some historians have raised questions about whether the Cercle existed at all.

The Cercle is noted by transgender historian Susan Stryker as "the first known informal organization in the United States to concern itself with what we might now call transgender social justice issues".

== June's Descriptions ==
Of the current knowledge we have, most is derived from the writings of activist Jennie June, concerning itself with recollections of conversations, happenings, activism, communion, current science of the time, & more.

Speaking of the membership, June notes: "The hermaphroditoi numbered about a score. All were highly cultured ultra-androgynes varying in age from eighteen to forty." "Cultured" meaning those who took great care to avoid being caught.
