= Mowry Saben =

American essayist and journalist

Israel Mowry Saben (March 24, 1870 – October 7, 1950) was an American essayist and journalist who was an early advocate for gender and sexual diversity.

== Life ==
Saben was born into a prominent family in Uxbridge, Massachusetts, the son of Israel Saben and Lydia Jane Albee. Richard Mowry, his father's maternal grandfather, was his great-grandfather. He had a younger sister, Jennie May, and younger brother named William. He later claimed his family was "Puritan" and that his father disinherited him for being "untamable". He attended Phillips Exeter Academy.

Starting 1891, Saben studied at Harvard University, being expulsed after in February 1892 police broke an "all-male gathering" in his room. In 1894, he started studying at Oxford University, later also studying at Heidelberg University and living in Europe for several years.

From 1898 to 1903, Saben was a travelling lecturer in the United States, giving talks “on various literary, ethical, and philosophical subjects,” such as Walt Whitman and Havelock Ellis' work and anarchism. One of his lectures became a basis for published book The Twilight of the Gods.

In 1900 Saben began his journalistic career at The Conservator, later being on the editorial staff of The New York Times and The Oregonian.

In 1919, Saben did work for United States House of Representatives Committee on Immigration and Naturalization, with the job being listed as a “janitor”, but probably being writing/editing instead. By 1921, he was listed as a “clerk” for the Committee. Saben also served as Assistant Secretary of Labor in the 1926-1929 period, when James J. Davis was secretary.

Starting in the mid-1930s, Saben contributed to The Argonaut, an influential weekly publication in San Francisco. Shortly before his death, he was also a contributing editor to Truth Seeker, the “official organ of the National Liberal League.”

He died in San Francisco in 1950, three weeks after falling ill with a liver condition.

=== Personal life ===
Saben never married. His Harvard friend Edwin Arlington Robinson implied in letters that Saben was attracted to men, with Robinson's biographer Scott Donaldson claiming that Saben was "probably attracted to men and women".

Since 1916 to receiving treatment in 1924, Saben suffered from anal fistula, which could have been a complication from being a receptive partner in anal sex.

== Jennie June ==
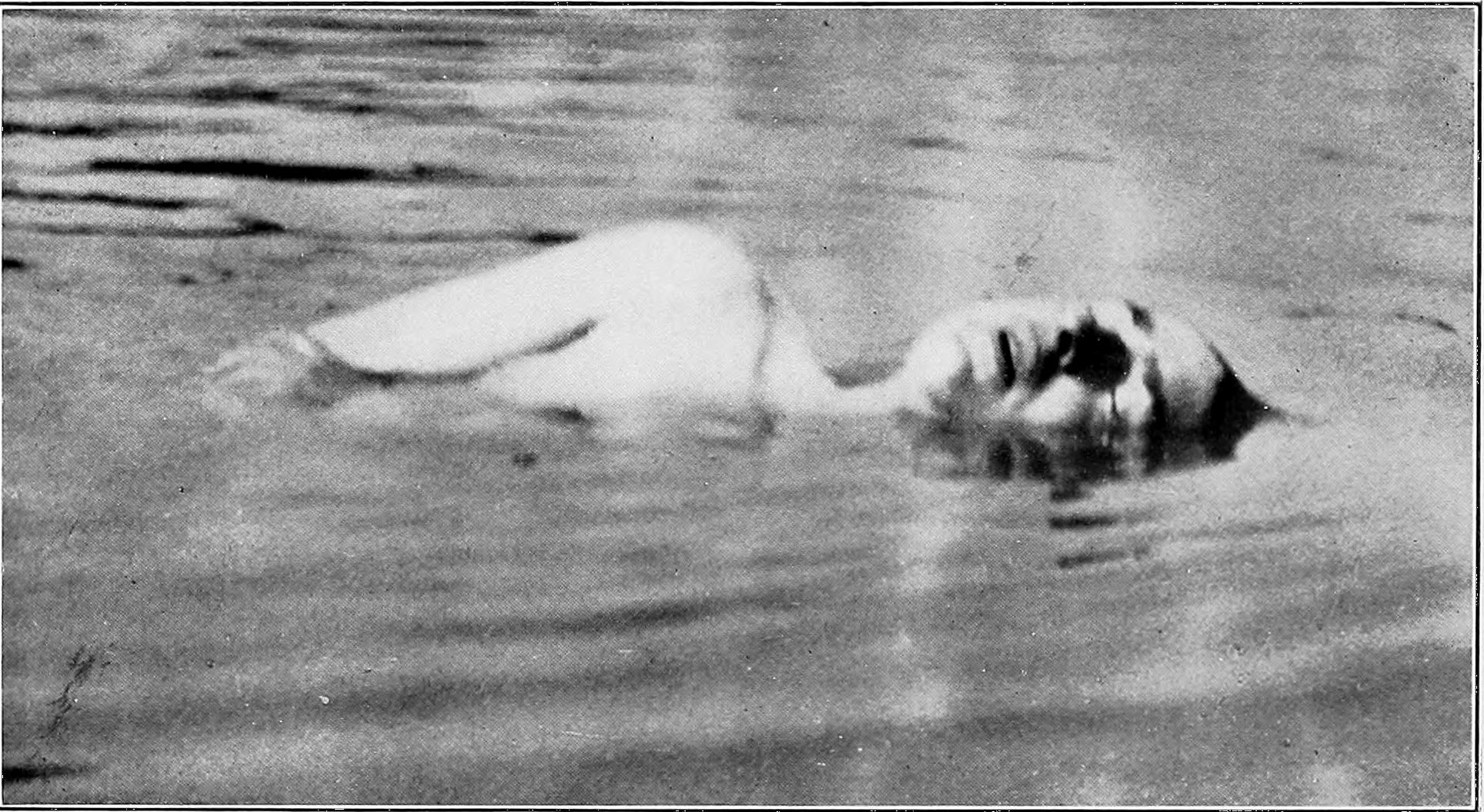
Jennie June at the age of thirty four

According to journalist Channing Gerard Joseph, Saben may have been the real identity of the pseudonymous Jennie June, a gender-non-conforming writer who in 1918 published The Autobiography of an Androgyne. Though June altered identifying details in his books to maintain his anonymity, there is considerable overlap with the details of Saben's own life. According to Joseph, June's manuscript and Saben's letters share typing quirks and reference similar stances and publications.
