= Paresis Hall =

Brothel and gay bar in New York City

- Interactive map of the Paresis Hall area
- Alternative names: Columbia Hall

General information
- Location: 392 Bowery (now 32 Cooper Square), New York City, United States
- Coordinates: 40.728183°N 73.991400°W
- Owner: James T. Ellison

Columbia Hall, commonly known as Paresis Hall, was a brothel, gay bar and meeting spot for "inverts" located at 392 Bowery in Manhattan, New York City, in the 1890s. Located near Cooper Union, the hall was owned by the gangster James T. Ellison.

== Name ==
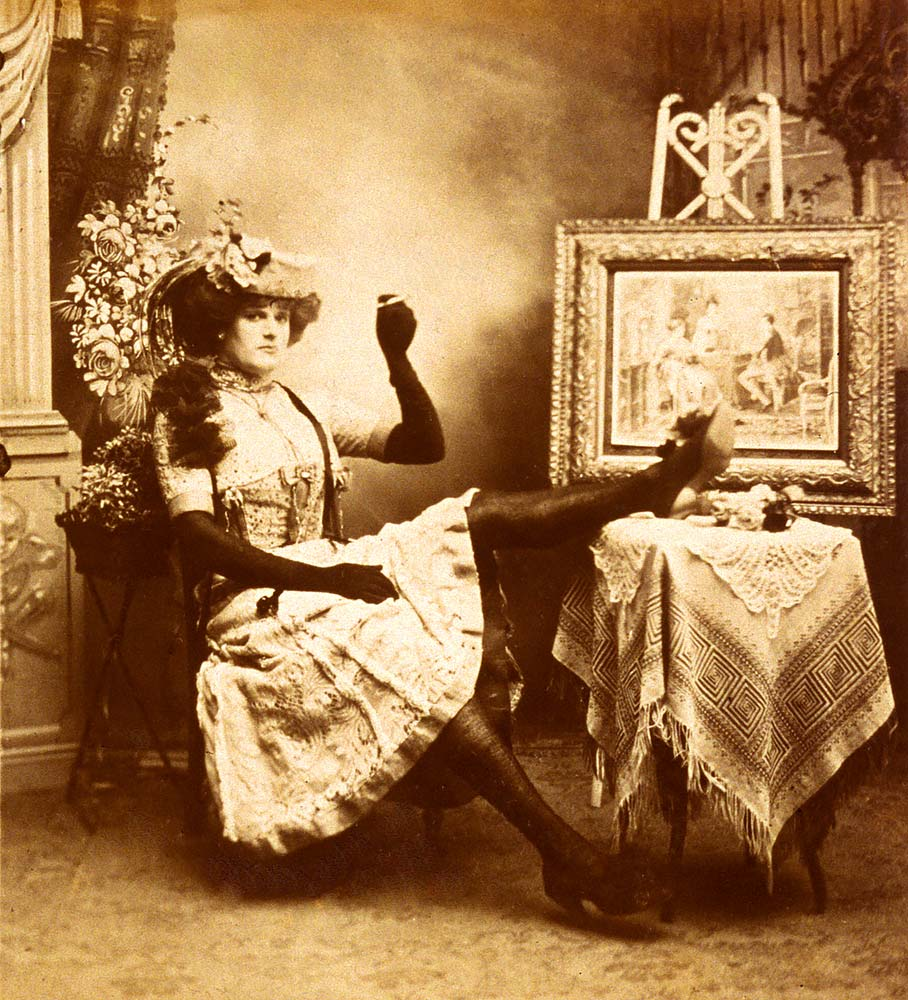
"Bowery Queen", c. 1890s

Paresis Hall took its common nickname from general paresis, a term for syphilitic insanity.

Jennie June wrote that the name "Paresis Hall" was the popular name, but androgynes disliked that name, and instead referred to it as "the Hall". June wrote that the term paresis was used as a general term for insanity, but also wrote that the name followed a superstition that androgynes could cause virile men to succumb to insanity, later discovered to be a side effect of advanced syphilis.

== Floors ==
On the ground floor, Paresis Hall had a small bar room in front, and a small beer garden behind it. The two floors above the ground floor were rented out in small rooms. At least ten rooms above the bar were used for private encounters.

== Cercle Hermaphroditos ==
One space above the bar was permanently rented by the Cercle Hermaphroditos, an early transgender advocacy organization. They stored clothing there because of the illegality of and public hostility to dressing in women's clothing.

According to historian Susan Stryker, the Cercle Hermaphroditos was the first group in the United States to be concerned with what today would be considered transgender social justice issues.

== Opposition ==
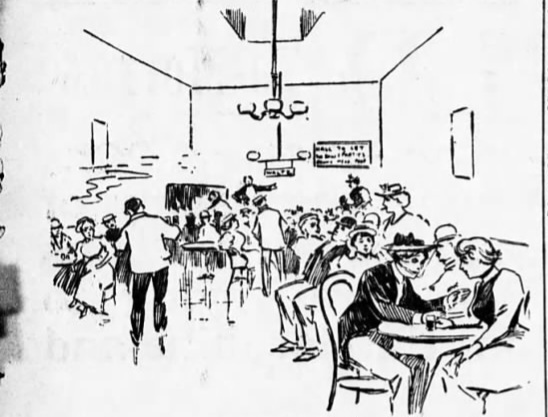
Interior illustration of Columbia Hall featured in The Evening World, 9th June 1894

Paresis Hall was particularly renowned and reviled even at the time, and was a common target for both police activity and religious protests. Despite this, evidence suggests it was active until at least 1899.

== See also ==
- Cross-dressing#Legal issues
- LGBT culture in New York City
