= June Lake (Vancouver Island) =

- Location within Vancouver Island
- Location: Vancouver Island, British Columbia
- Coordinates: 49°29′00″N 125°16′00″W
- Lake type: Natural lake
- Basin countries: Canada

June Lake is a lake on Vancouver Island north of Great Central Lake and north east of Oshinow Lake.

== See also ==
- List of lakes of British Columbia
