= June Lee =

American physician

June H. Lee, M.D.
- Education: Johns Hopkins University, University of California, Davis
- Scientific career
- Workplaces: Genentech, MyoKardia, UCSF, Foresite Labs

June Lee is an adjunct professor in the UCSF School of Medicine, biotech executive, and medical doctor with expertise in pulmonary, critical care medicine and translational research.

== Background ==
June Lee was born in Seoul, South Korea, and immigrated to United States at age 10. June, her two brothers, and her parents settled in southern California.

She graduated from John F. Kennedy High School in Granada Hills. She developed interest in medicine and science early in part due to a familial hereditary condition. She received her undergraduate degree in chemistry at Johns Hopkins University in 1988, and earned her medical degree at the University of California, Davis in 1992. She performed residency in internal medicine at UCLA and fellowship in pulmonary and critical medicine at UCSF.

== Career ==
=== Hospital work ===
Lee served as the medical director of the High-Risk Asthma Clinic at San Francisco General Hospital. She maintained an independent research program prior to Genentech, funded by the American Lung Association, to investigate IL-13 induced transcription, among other pulmonary treatments.

=== Genentech ===
Lee joined the clinical development organization at Genentech initially to help launch a new biologic treatment for asthma (the data from a large respiratory study – TENOR – that resulted in multiple insights into risk factors and demographics for asthma sufferers).

=== UCSF ===
Lee holds a professorship at UCSF in the School of Medicine. She was the director of Early Translational Research at UCSF. From 2011 to 2017, Lee served as the director of the Catalyst Program inside UCSF, which served as an internal incubator for entrepreneurial ideas from faculty, in addition to providing de-risking outsourcing partnerships and educational modules for graduate students.

=== MyoKardia ===
Lee served as the chief operating officer and chief development officer for MyoKardia. Myokardia was acquired by Bristol Myers Squibb for $13.1 billion in November 2020.

=== Esker Therapeutics ===
June was the President and Founding CEO of Esker Therapeutics.

=== Other ===
She is a member of the board of directors for Novus Therapeutics, GenEdit and serves on the scientific advisory board for Foresite Labs and Aer Therapeutics. She also serves on the advisory board for the Johns Hopkins University Center for Therapeutic Translation.

== Public service ==
Lee has been a volunteer member of the Council of Korean Americans since 2013, and currently sits on its board of directors and previously served as chair of the board. She has served previously as chair of the Drug, Device, Discovery, and Development Workgroup of UC BRAID (University of California Biomedical Research Acceleration Integration and Development).

Lee is a fellow of the American College of Chest Physicians.
