= Shun Cutlery =

Japanese kitchen knife brand

- Industry: Kitchenware
- Founded: 2002; 24 years ago
- Headquarters: Tokyo, Japan
- Key people: Koji Endo, CEO and President of the KAI Group; Nori Sawamura, Chief of North American Operations
- Products: Kitchen knives
- Website: shun.kaiusaltd.com

Shun Cutlery is a kitchen knife brand of the KAI Group, headquartered in Tokyo, Japan. In the United States, Shun is sold by Kai USA in Tualatin, Oregon—alongside the Kershaw Knives and Zero Tolerance Knives brands.

== History ==
The origins of the Kai Group date back to 1908, when founder Saijiro Endo established the company in Seki City, Japan. The company produced various cutlery throughout the 20th century, including folding knives, razors, and kitchen cutlery. In 2002, Kai introduced the Shun Cutlery brand to the Western market. All Shun knives are currently made in Seki City and are distributed to over 30 countries.

=== Awards ===
The Shun Classic Hollow-Ground Santoku was the first Shun to earn a Blade Show award, winning Knife of the Year in 2003

Shun has been recognized at the annual Blade Show in Atlanta, Georgia. Additionally, International Forum Design presented the Shun/Ken Onion Chef's Knife with an iF Product Design Award in 2005.

== Products ==
A selection of knives in the Shun Kanso series, including the chef's, utility, and paring knives.

Shun Cutlery produces several lines of kitchen knives in Seki City, Japan.

Shun Series

- Classic
- Classic Pro
- Dual Core
- Fuji
- Hikari
- Hiro
- Kaji
- Kanso
- Premier
- Shun Blue
- Sora

== Appearances in media ==
A Shun Hollow-Ground Slicing Knife appeared in season 3 of Hannibal. A Classic Bird's Beak knife also made an appearance on True Detective.

A set of Shun Premier cutlery was seen on the season 4 finale of The Blacklist. Outdoorsman Steven Rinella also used a Premier Chef's Knife on season 5 of MeatEater.

Mystery writer Jeffery Deaver included a Shun Premier Slicing Knife in the crime novel The Kill Room.

A virtual Shun knife is an award in the mobile game Family Guy: The Quest for Stuff.

Meghan, Duchess of Sussex, was featured in the first season of With Love, Meghan cutting foods with the Shun Classic hollow-ground santoku knife in Blonde and the Shun Classic paring knife in Onyx.
