= Jun Ahn =

South Korean photographer

- 안준
- Born: 1981 (age 44–45); Seoul, South Korea
- Education: University of Southern California
- Notable work: Self-Portrait (2013), One Life (2018)
- Style: Portrait Photography
- Awards: Ones to Watch (2013), Asian Artist to Watch (2013)
- Website: https://ahnjun.com

Jun Ahn (안준) is a South Korean photographer, known primarily for her Self-Portrait series of photographs taken from atop high buildings. She has worked extensively in the United States, particularly in New York City, now living with her family in Seoul, South Korea.

She has produced the books Self-Portrait (2018) and One Life (2018) and Until You Left Off Dreaming About(2013).

== Career ==
Ahn was educated at the University of Southern California, graduating with a degree in art history in 2006, followed by two years of postgraduate study of photography at the Pratt Institute. While at the Pratt she began work on the Self-Portrait project.

In 2009 and in 2010 she was awarded the Dean's Scholarship at Parsons The New School for Design, and in 2011 received both the Dean's and a departmental scholarship. During this time her work received its first major exhibitions, including a joint exhibition with Kazue Taguchi at PS 122 in New York. The Parsons awarded her a Master of Fine Arts with honors in January 2012, following which she enrolled in a PhD program in photography at Hongik University in Seoul. Ahn received a PhD in photography. Her dissertation examined the aesthetics of high-speed photography in the context of her work.

=== Self-Portrait ===
South Korean artist Jun Ahn describes her series Self-Portrait (2008–2013) as “a kind of performance without an audience.”

Self-Portrait depicts Ahn on or near the top of skyscrapers, often leaning from a window or seated on a ledge. Ahn was inspired by a joke about jumping off a building due to the stock market losses from the 2008 financial crisis. She began to think of tall buildings in urban areas as places of contrasts. Ahn sees cities as areas of simultaneous comfort and anxiety, with her photos showing her on the edge of both a physical and psychological space.

Aiming her lens straight down, she records her feet and the sheer drop to the streets below, so that the city reads as a vertiginous bird’s-eye field. The work is strongly experiential, pushing the viewer to feel the same mix of thrill, fear and anxiety that such a position provokes. The project began with a photograph of her feet she took while sitting on the edge of an apartment building while a student at Pratt, and has continued since. The bulk of the photographs are from New York and Seoul, with some from Hong Kong. While Ahn used various safety measures for Self-Portrait, she never altered her photographs in a graphics editor like Photoshop.

For these photographs, Ahn works by gaining access to the building legitimately - it can take several months for the owners to give permission for the project - and setting a digital camera to take a large volume of high-speed images while she poses. These are then sifted to find a picture depicting Ahn looking unconcerned or distracted, captured in what she describes as "...a certain moment of time that did exist, but which we couldn't perceive with the naked eye because it happened too fast."Ahn names the scientist and photographer Harold Edgerton — pioneer of the high-speed electronic flash, famous for his image of a bullet piercing an apple — as her greatest influence. For her, such pictures reveal an aesthetic in which the image is severed from ordinary perception and free to generate its own context within an isolated space and time; photography, she says, is “reality and fantasy, the truth and fake at the same time.” She frames her own practice as the capture of a fleeting, dreamlike instant in which reality meets fantasy, and aligns it with what she calls the “directed decisive moment,” a deliberate play on Henri Cartier-Bresson’s celebrated phrase. In doing so she both extends and complicates the conventional relationship between photography and performance, in which the camera merely documents an otherwise ephemeral act.

The Guardian reported that "In the most dangerous shots, such as when she is using her whole body to lean dangerously over the edge, a harness is sometimes used. She explains: "Of course it is not a safe situation. But I always try to be careful.""

=== One Life ===
Ahn began One Life in 2013, after completing Self-Portrait. She was influenced by her time as a teacher at the Korea University Museum. Noting the high levels of anxiety among her students, she started One Life to show and examine the uncertainty and randomness of life. The photography for One Life happened over five years and involved objects captured while in the air, most commonly apples. Ahn said the photographs represent how life is “a process of free fall,” like an object affected by gravity..

== Works on Artificial Intelligence ==
Since the advent of text-to-image artificial intelligence, Ahn has published various projects and research exploring the structure in which datasets are formed and concepts are visualized.

=== Good Morning, John ===
Around 2023, Ahn extended her practice from high-speed photography into artificial intelligence and text-to-image generation. She had long used high-speed photography to record phenomena beyond ordinary human perception, and she ties that interest directly to machine vision: noting that the speed at which we perceive the world is limited to roughly a tenth of a second, she observes that “all those high-speed photographic images are part of AI datasets. Hence, we are already sharing memories with machines.”

Drawing on her background in art history, she turned to examining how such systems visually interpret natural language. While working with Microsoft’s Bing Image Creator (now Copilot), Ahn found that the platform algorithmically filtered out words such as “yourself” and “god” from its image-generation parameters; in response she devised prompt structures to work around those restrictions. The resulting series — Good Morning, John, together with the related A Room for You and God — visualizes, through such prompts, a self-anthropomorphized system greeting its maker in the morning. Ahn then re-photographed the AI-generated images as they appeared on floating monitors.

In the series, the artificial intelligence appears as portraits in the form of human faces. Ahn draws an analogy to the idea of a god shaping humans from clay in his own image: the intelligence that humans have built likewise mirrors the human form. She asks what such an intelligence might think on seeing its own portrait from behind, using the works to probe how humans and machines perceive one another and how an artificial intelligence might define itself.

The title echoes Nam June Paik’s 1984 satellite broadcast Good Morning, Mr. Orwell, an optimistic answer to the surveillance dystopia of George Orwell’s Nineteen Eighty-Four; the name “John” refers to John McCarthy, who coined the term “artificial intelligence.” For Ahn the title at once announces the arrival of mainstream AI and holds together the Orwellian wariness and the Paik-like optimism that shape her approach to new media.

=== Until You Left Off Dreaming About ===
Ahn’s project, Until You Left Off Dreaming About, marked a full turn to AI image-making. Created around 2023 while she was recovering from major surgery — bedridden and confronting her own mortality — it is composed entirely of AI-generated images. Rather than photographing the world, Ahn used text-to-image generators, which she likened to a form of dream-like imagination, to give shape to scenes she had only pictured in her mind. The images draw on memories of other people’s stories and of moments shared with her while she was living and studying in the United States in the early 2000s, before the spread of smartphones. Published by Case Publishing in 2024, the book gathers 307 images across 288 pages, with texts in English, Japanese, French and Korean.

Ahn has framed the series as an attempt to picture a life she did not lead. Wondering whether, had she set off travelling in her early twenties instead of sitting exams and working part-time jobs, she might have made such photographs, she describes the resulting landscapes as “a nostalgia for something that I have never had.”

The project has been taken up in scholarship on AI and photography. In the journal Photographies, the photography theorist David Bate cites Until You Left Off Dreaming About as a case study in what he terms “AI as composite memory,” describing it as a 2023 book of 307 text-generated images made with Midjourney and published in Japan, its prompts drawn from Ahn’s recollections of life as a Korean student in Los Angeles before the advent of smartphones. For Bate such generative images are “not simply fake or real, but statistical samples” — aggregates of cultural data with no single origin in time or place — so that works like Ahn’s stage a new relation to the photographic archive, in which culturally formed memories are recombined into speculative forms of subjective memory.

== Publications ==
- Self-Portrait. Kyoto: Akaaka, 2018.
- One Life. Tokyo: Case, 2018.
- Until You Left Off Dreaming About Tokyo: Case, 2023.

== Exhibitions ==
=== Solo exhibitions ===
- 2012: Self-Portrait, Anna Nova Gallery, St. Petersburg, Russia
- 2013: Ahn Jun Solo Exhibition, Kips Gallery, New York AHAF 13’ Mandarin Oriental Hotel, Hong Kong
- 2014: Self-Portrait, Christophe Guye Galerie, Zurich, Switzerland
- 2015: On the Edge of Time, Mandarin Oriental Hotel, Hong Kong
- 2016: The Present, 63 Art Museum, Seoul, Korea
- 2017: InvisibleScapes, Xijiantang Art Museum, Jindezhen, China
- 2018: On The Verge, Photographic Center Northwest, Seattle, WA, USA

=== Group exhibitions ===
- 2011: Parsons Festival, New York, United States
- 2013: The Youth Code, Christophe Guye Galerie, Zurich, Switzerland
- 2014: Double Mirror: Korean-American Artists, American University Museum, Washington, United States
- 2015: As Far as the Mind Can See, exd'15, Porto, Portugal
- 2016: Ich, Schirn Kunsthalle, Frankfurt, Germany
- 2018: Space; Crashes in Street Life, Triennial of Photography Hamburg

== Awards ==
- 2013: "Ones To Watch," British Journal of Photography, London
- 2013: "Asian Artist to Watch in 2013," South China Morning Post, Hong Kong
- 2021: "2021 Parcours Femme, Elle x Paris Photo, Paris
