= Jennie June (autobiographer) =

American writer and activist

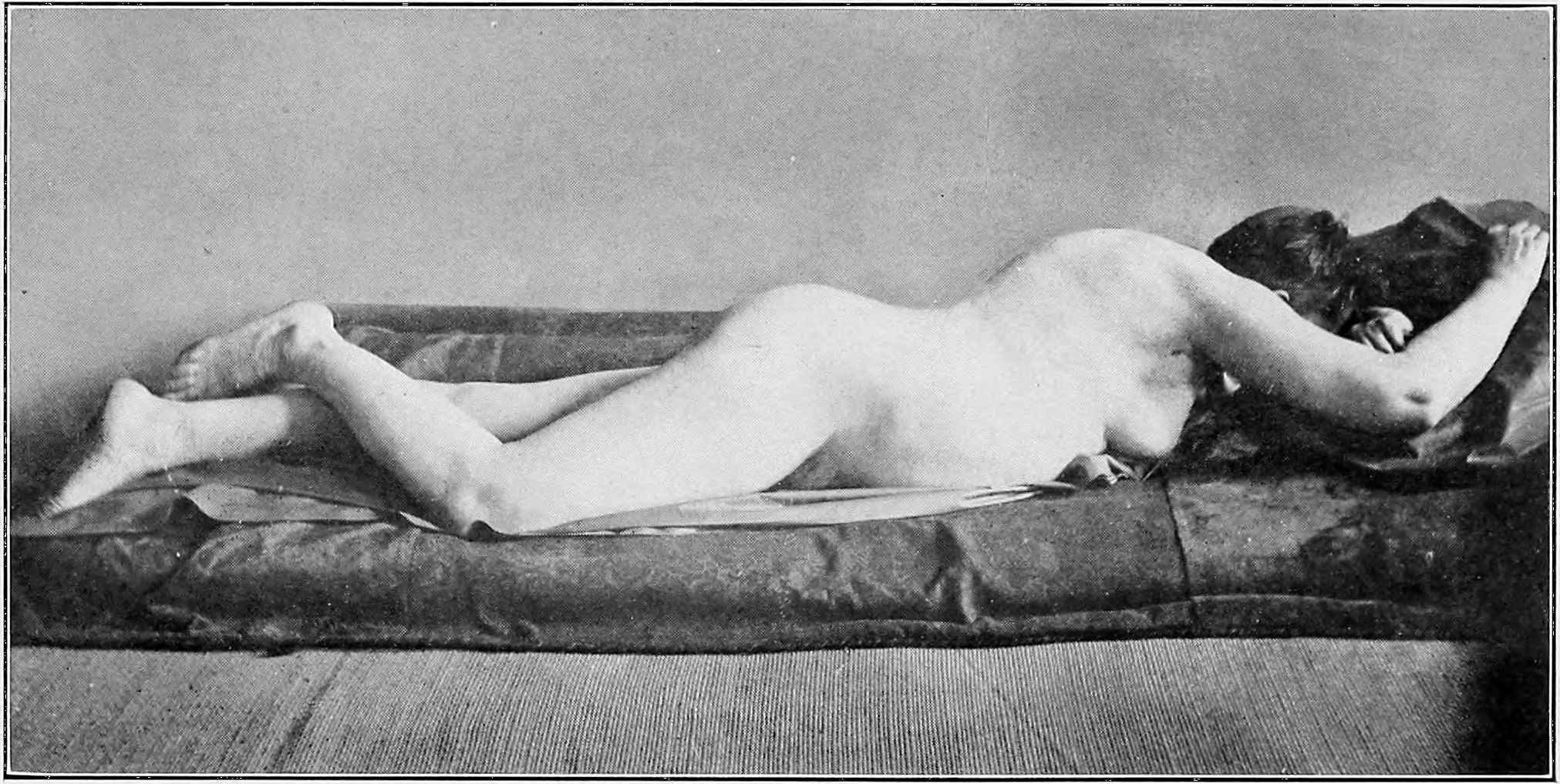
- Jennie June posing as "A Modern Living Replica of the Ancient Greek Statue of Hermaphroditos", 1918
- Born: 1874; Connecticut, U.S.
- Died: Unknown
- Occupations: Autobiographer; law clerk
- Writing career
- Pen name: Earl Lind, Ralph Werther
- Years active: 1895–1922
- Notable works: The Autobiography of an Androgyne; The Female-Impersonators; The Riddle of the Underworld

Jennie June (1874 – after 1922) was a pseudonymous American writer known for advocating for the rights of people who did not conform to gender and sexual norms.

June was one of the earliest transgender individuals to publish an autobiography in the United States. Although June expressed a lifelong desire to be a woman, June consistently used masculine pronouns in reference to themself. June wrote of feeling like a combination of male and female and of their practice of alternating between these two gender expressions.

They published their first memoir, The Autobiography of an Androgyne, in 1918, and their second, The Female-Impersonators, in 1922. June also wrote an unpublished third autobiography in 1921. June claimed their goal in writing these books was to help create an accepting environment for young adults who do not conform to gender or sexual norms. In 1895, June created the Cercle Hermaphroditos, an organization for the rights of androgynes. Most members were claimed by June as being ultra-androgynes.

June's identity is unknown; they also wrote under the pseudonyms Earl Lind and Ralph Werther. Queer history researcher Channing Gerard Joseph believes that June was most likely the writer and journalist Israel Mowry Saben (1870–1950), an early advocate for gender and sexual diversity.

== Early life ==
According to their pseudonymous memoir, Jennie June was born into a Puritan family in 1874 in Connecticut. They were assigned male at birth. June was the fourth child out of eleven children of a middle-class family. As a child, June believed that they would only wear skirts in adulthood and had asked friends to refer to them by "Jennie". Though, when June was seven, they would be breeched. This led to June experiencing bouts of depression, and prompted June to start wearing their sister's clothing, and praying to live as a woman.

In childhood, June was sent to a school for boys who needed strict discipline; following this experience, they became very shy and introverted. In June's adolescence they experienced some breast growth, though June would state they had felt disappointed by their genitalia staying the same. During this time, June would also start praying to no longer be gender-nonconforming and to not desire men.

At eighteen, due to bouts of depression pertaining to their gender identity, June would seek help from venereologist Dr. Prince A. Morrow and psychiatrist Dr. Robert S. Newton. Morrow and Newton had seen gender nonconformity as a defect and attempted to cure June through various treatments, which included drugs, hypnosis, aphrodisiacs, and electroconvulsive therapy. These treatments had no effect, and June remained gender nonconforming and depressed.

June later graduated with honors at an unidentified university and then attended graduate school but was subsequently expelled after a physician notified the university that June was gender nonconforming. June experienced depression and suicidal ideation following this expulsion. Though it was also influential to their later writings.

== Personal life ==
In June's professional life, they had presented as a man. They worked as a law clerk for Clark Bell, who was an editor for The Medico-Legal Journal and its publishing company. Many who had worked with June would state that June was uncomfortable around the presence of men and often disengaged from topics of a sexual nature. At the same time, they would also be noted to be hardworking by co-workers.

== Identity and transition ==
In June's writings, June had described themself with all of these contemporary words for their gender and sexual variance:

- androgyne, an ancient word meaning one who has a combination of masculine and feminine qualities.
- invert, a contemporary word from psychiatry and sexology for all kinds of people who would in the 20th and 21st centuries be called lesbian, gay, bisexual, or transgender (LGBT).
- urning, a new contemporary word meaning someone assigned male at birth who is attracted to men. This word was created by urnings themselves who advocated for their rights. It was often Anglicized as "Uranian", but June used the original Germanic version "urning", for themself. Karl Heinrich Ulrichs (1825–1895) developed this theory in which men who are attracted to men and women who are attracted to women are thus because they are members of a third sex, a mixture of both male and female, with the psyche or essence of the "opposite" sex, even though their bodies may not look like a mixture of male and female. The overall phenomenon he called Uranismus (in the original German: Urningtum); gay men were uranians (German urnings), lesbians were uraniads (German urningin, as -in is the feminine suffix); whereas heterosexuals were Dionings, so bisexual men were uranodionings, and so on, all of which were distinct from zwitter (intersex). Ulrichs based this naming system on Plato's Symposium, where two different kinds of love [are] ruled by two different goddesses of love—Aphrodite, daughter of Uranus, and Aphrodite, daughter of Zeus and Dione. Aphrodite rules those who love the opposite sex. Ulrichs argued that their condition was as natural and healthy as that of what we now call heterosexual people, and he started the movement fighting for their equal legal rights to express their love "between consenting adults, with the free consent of both parties", in their words from 1870, and that they should not be pathologized nor criminalized for doing so. Although Uranismus was generally addressed in terms of orientation, Ulrichs specifically described various categories of uranians in terms of their gender nonconformity and gender variance. For example, in regard to feminine gay men or queens (whom he called Weiblings), Ulrichs wrote in 1879, "The Weibling is a total mixture of male and female, in which the female element is even predominant, a thoroughly hermaphroditically organized being. Despite his male sexual organs, he is more woman than man. He is a woman with male sexual organs. He is a neutral sex. He is a neuter. He is the hermaphrodite of the ancients." June compares themself to this ancient deity Hermaphroditus in their own self-portrait photography.
- bisexual, in the sense of being both male and female, as June said they were never attracted to women at all.
- "instinctive female impersonator", meaning that it was their nature to want to live as a woman.
- fairie [sic], a word widely used in the contemporary underworld for people who were assigned male at birth and who had receptive sex with men.
- Ultra-Androgyne, meaning those at the very end of Androgyne who both felt and acted predominantly female. Those of this type were described as shaving and plucking their beard hair, in public preferring bright clothing in lieu of the risk associated with female clothing, although some risqué did don the latter. Furthermore, they usually took on submissive/passive roles during intercourse and despised vulgarity and other typically masculine things. Additionally, June states the correct pronouns for an Ultra-Androgyne would be he/her. A quote from her second book reads: "Superficially and according to man-made law, ultra-androgynes are men. According to the unabridged dictionary, they are neither men nor women. That is, they are capable neither of begetting nor conceiving. But in respect to mind and feelings, in respect to their protoplasm—and thus essentially—they are women." June estimated they numbered at least 1 in every 300 individuals globally.

June's third doctor was a psychiatrist who understood inversion better. (The transcription of the manuscript of The Riddle of the Underworld also calls him Dr. Robert S. Newton, giving this name to two different doctors, which is a transcription error.) The psychiatrist taught June that being an androgyne was natural for them and not a "depravity". This finally cured June's lifelong depression, because instead of trying to purge themself of their inversion out of the fear that it was a sin, they instead concluded that God had predestined them to be an invert.

According to one autobiography, June had engaged in "intimate relations" with 800 young men, half of whom were volunteer soldiers or sailors.

At the age of 28, June fulfilled their lifelong desire to have an orchiectomy, the removal of the testicles. June expected this would make them healthier and decrease their extreme and "disturbing" desires for sex and eliminate some masculine features they disliked, such as facial hair. During that era, there was the incorrect but widespread medical belief that nocturnal emissions would damage a person's health and intelligence, and June was fearful of that possibility. Castration was one of the commonly recommended treatments thought to cure males of inversion.

== Community and activism ==
As a young adult, June found safe havens in places such as the gay bar Paresis Hall, or Columbia Hall, in New York City to express their feminine identity. Paresis Hall was one of many establishments considered the center of homosexual nightlife where male prostitutes would solicit men under an effeminate persona.

June was one of the members of the Cercle Hermaphroditos in 1895, led by pseudonymous Roland Reeves, along with other androgynes who frequented Paresis Hall. The purpose of the organization was "to unite for defense against the world's bitter persecution" and to show that being an invert was natural. The Cercle is noted by transgender historian Susan Stryker as "the first known informal organization in the United States to concern itself with what we might now call transgender social justice issues". Little evidence of the Cercle's existence is known to survive today, outside of June's autobiography. If it issued any pamphlets, none are yet known to historians. For this reason, some historians have raised questions about whether the Cercle existed at all.

== Autobiography ==
June published their first autobiography, The Autobiography of an Androgyne, in 1918, and their second, The Female-Impersonators, in 1922. June would state that they had kept diaries pertaining to their life and that their autobiographies had been based on these diaries. The two books were published under the name "Earl Lind ('Ralph Werther'--'Jennie June')" and edited by Dr. Alfred W. Herzog, Editor of the Medico-Legal Journal.

June's autobiographies were organized into episode-like sections, wherein they discuss incidents in their life, as well as their opinions on certain social matters. June's stated goal in writing their autobiographies was to rally the support of Americans to create an accepting environment for gender nonconforming individuals. June hoped their autobiographies would prevent gender nonconforming individuals from committing suicide.

The memoir describes in detail many personal narratives as well as June's sexual encounters and desires, including their story of their castration, but also contains pleas for understanding and acceptance of "fairies". The Autobiography of an Androgyne also describes how June felt that they lived a double life in the sense that they were an educated, middle-class white male scholar but also had intense, distressing yearnings for performing masochistic sexual acts.

== The Female-Impersonators ==
June's second book, released under the alias Earl Lind, was released in 1921 with 1,000 copies produced that were intended to be sent to various individuals in the medical communities. It focused on subjects such as hate-crimes, murder, blackmail, general violence and sexual abuse. The book also focuses on June's early years, and the lives of two other gender nonconforming individuals.

== The Riddle of the Underworld ==
In 2010, Dr. Randall Sell, a professor at Drexel University, became intrigued by the first two volumes of the trilogy. After searching for around twenty years for the long-lost third volume, he finally discovered the partial manuscript in the Victor Robinson papers of the National Library of Medicine.

Called The Riddle of the Underworld, written in 1921, this third volume was to focus on the communities of inverts all over the world. It includes an encounter in which June was beaten by men whom they had tried to pick up. June once again defends gender and sexual nonconformists, insisting that they were simply born of a different nature but natural nonetheless.

As mentioned in their second book, one chapter of Riddle was to be dedicated to the Gynander, those with "physically female bodies" who leaned into masculinity by varying degrees, but this one was not found within the Robinson manuscript.

Riddle was slated to be released in parts in Dr. Robinson's Medical Life journal by or after March 1922, but this never came to be despite the contract and conditions for publication found with the manuscript. A planned trilogy collection of all books was intended to release in fall 1922, but this never happened. Early 1922 appears to be the last time June was active within the Underworld.

== Mowry Saben theory ==
The date of June's death is unknown.

Historian Channing Gerard Joseph theorizes that June was likely Mowry Saben (1870–1950), the writer and journalist. Saben was born in Uxbridge, Massachusetts, into a prominent family and had a younger sister, Jennie May. They graduated from Harvard University, Oxford University, and Heidelberg University. They died in San Francisco in 1950.

== Legacy ==
June left instructions for the creation of a memorial plaque. June wanted the plaque to be placed on the Grand Street facade of a new police building, near the site of their debut, where they had first taken the name Jennie June. A police building could be considered an intriguing choice, given the police harassment June and their friends experienced.

== Works ==
- Autobiography of an Androgyne, published 1918
- The Female-impersonators, published 1922
- The Riddle of the Underworld, written in 1921, unpublished. Only three chapters of the manuscript are known to survive

== Photos ==
Jennie June published these photographs of themself in their books. Along with June's use of pseudonyms, these photos mostly obscure June's face, as a further protection of anonymity, even while exposing June's body, because there were laws in New York against cross-dressing. Some of these photographs treat their subject as a medical specimen because a popular Victorian pseudoscience called physiognomy believed that personality could be seen in the shape of the body, supporting June's argument that it is in their nature to be an invert. The statue that June imitates in one of these photos is the Sleeping Hermaphroditus, a lost bronze original by the ancient Greek Polycles (working c. 155 BC). The Borghese Hermaphroditus is usually considered the main ancient Roman copy of that lost original and has been in the Louvre since before 1863. The one in Uffizi that June mentions is another ancient Roman copy.

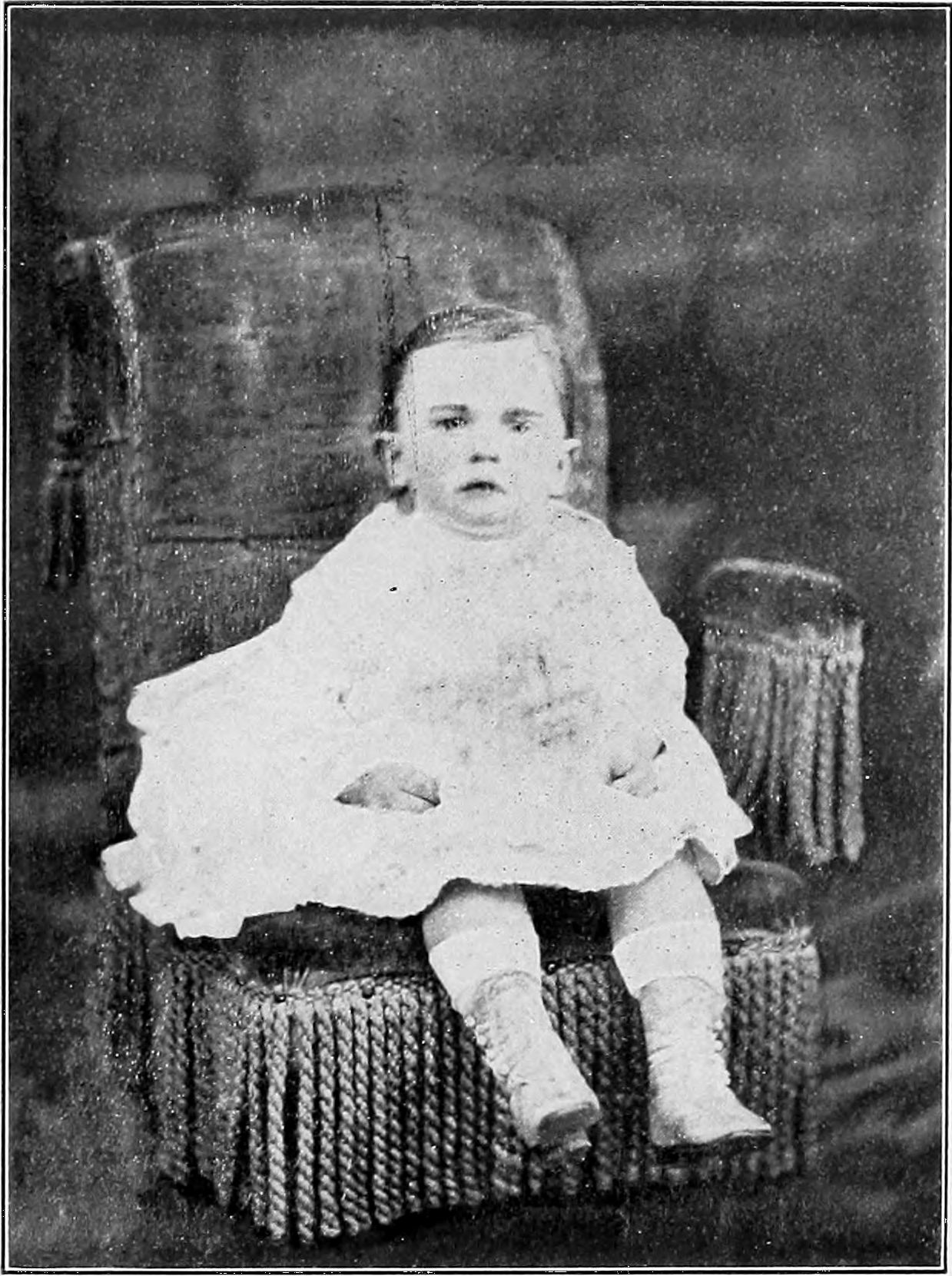
"The Author Ready to Set Out on Life's Journey"

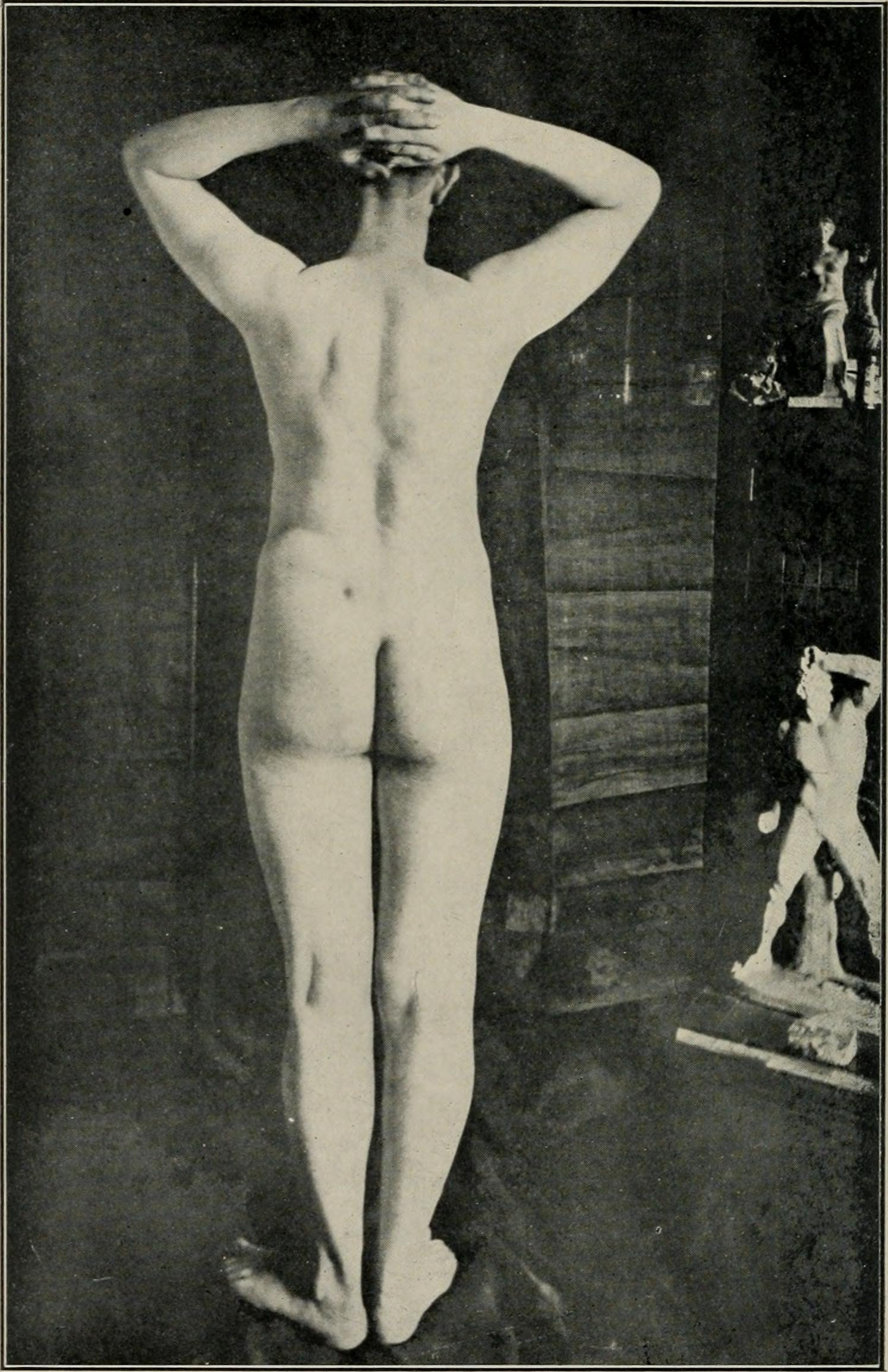
"Rear View of Author at Thirty-three"

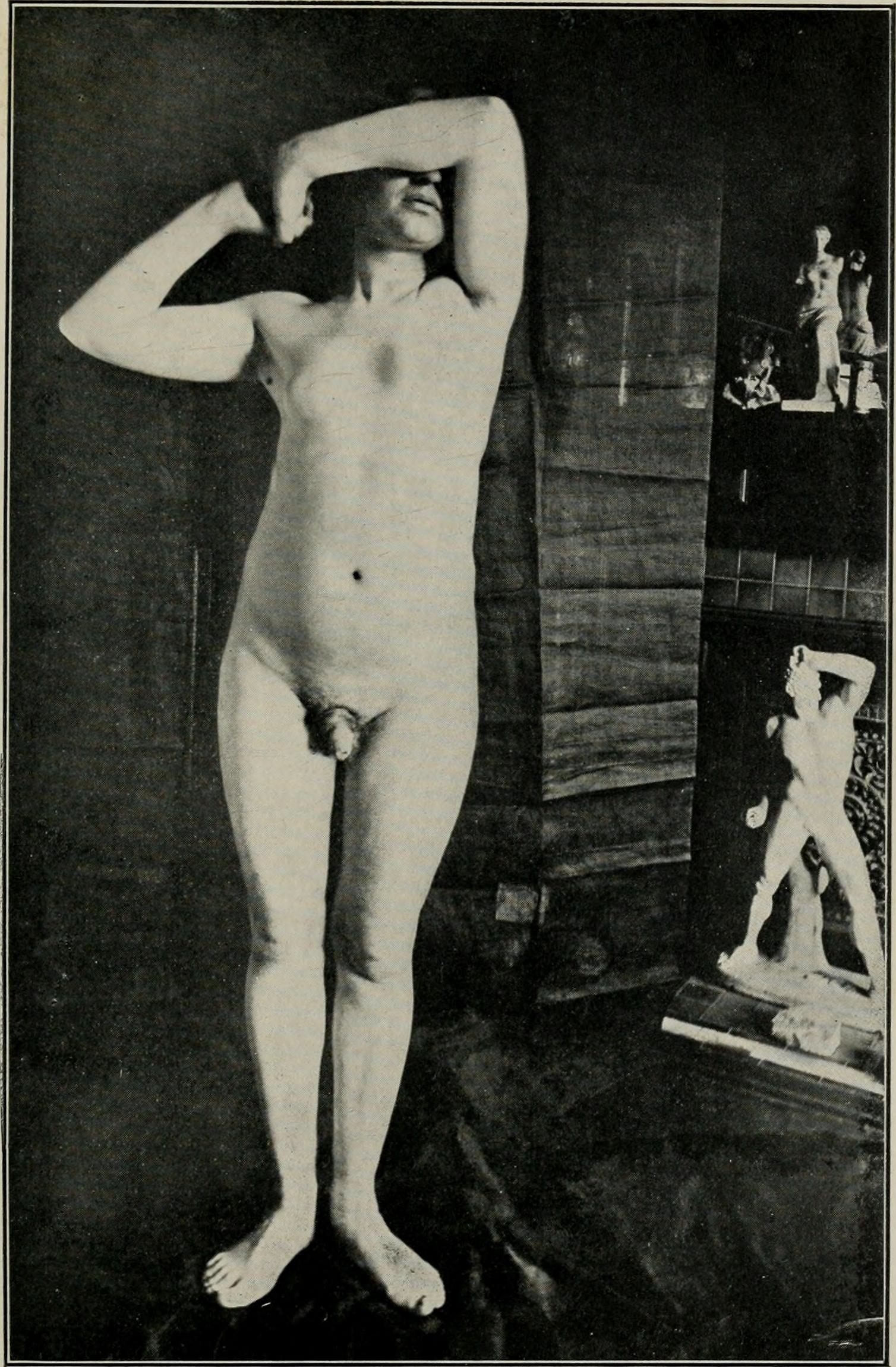
"Front View of Author at Thirty-three"

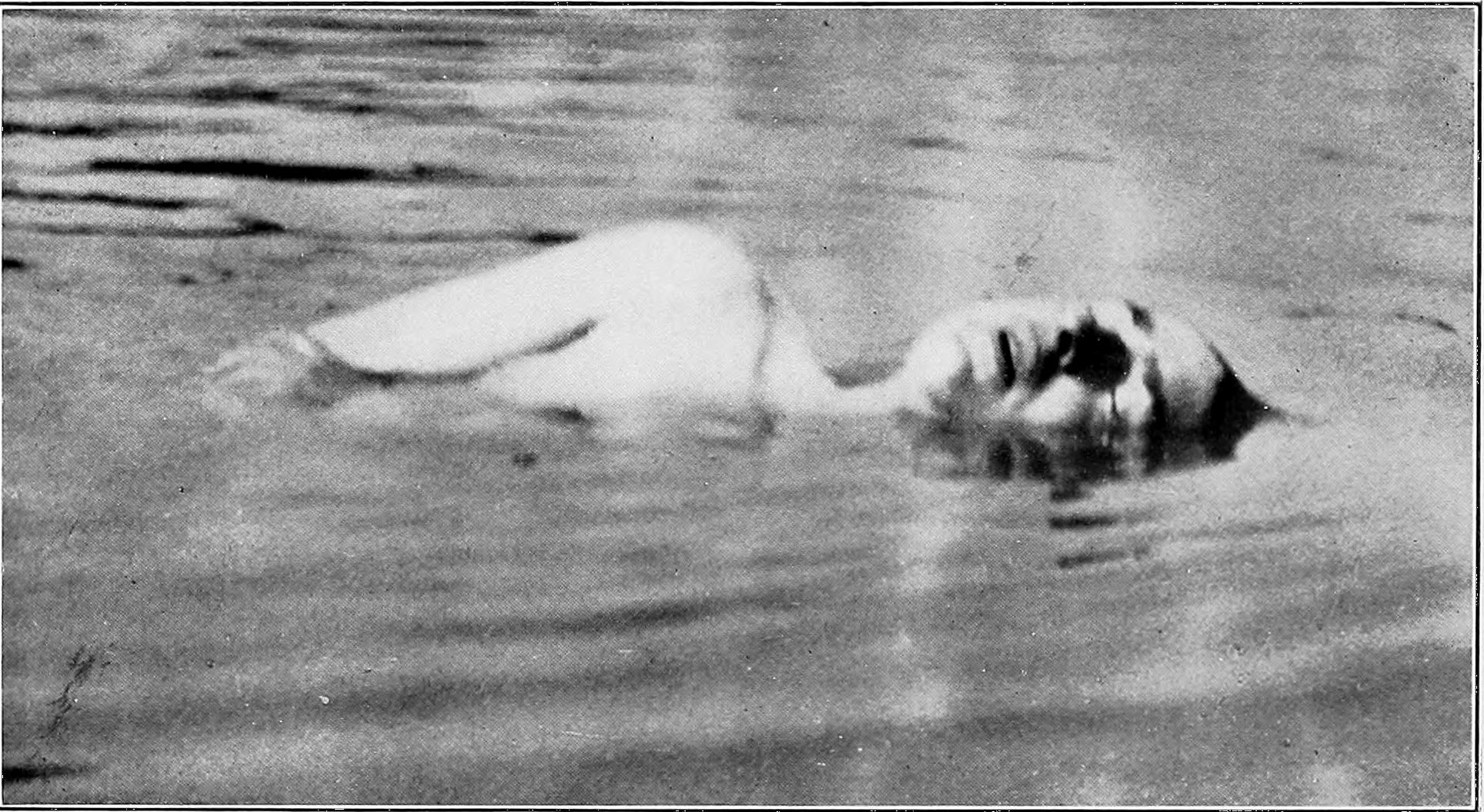
"The Author at Thirty-four"

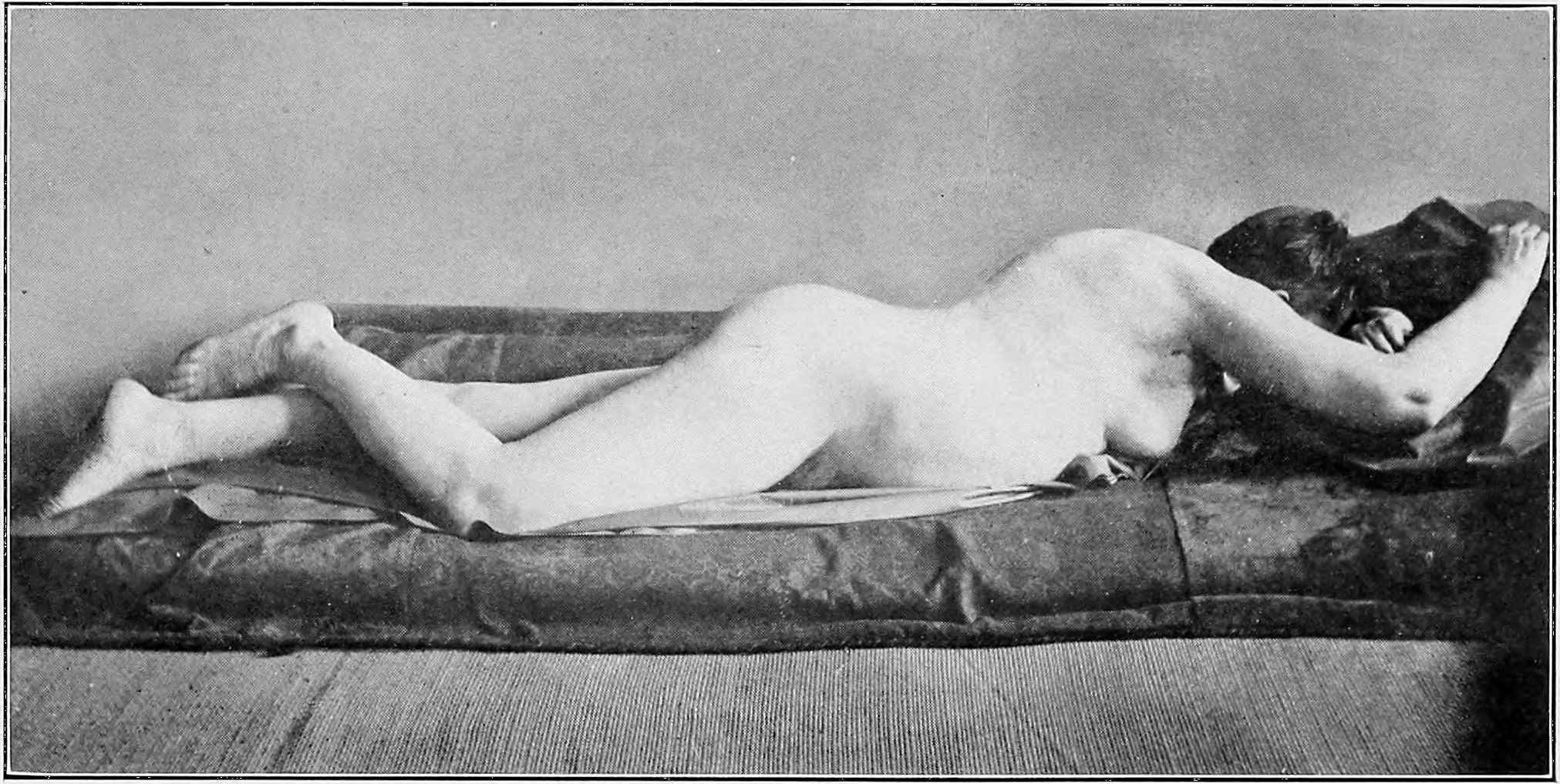
"The Author—a Modern Living Replica of the Ancient Greek Statue, 'Hermaphroditos' (Photo by Dr. A. W. Herzog)"

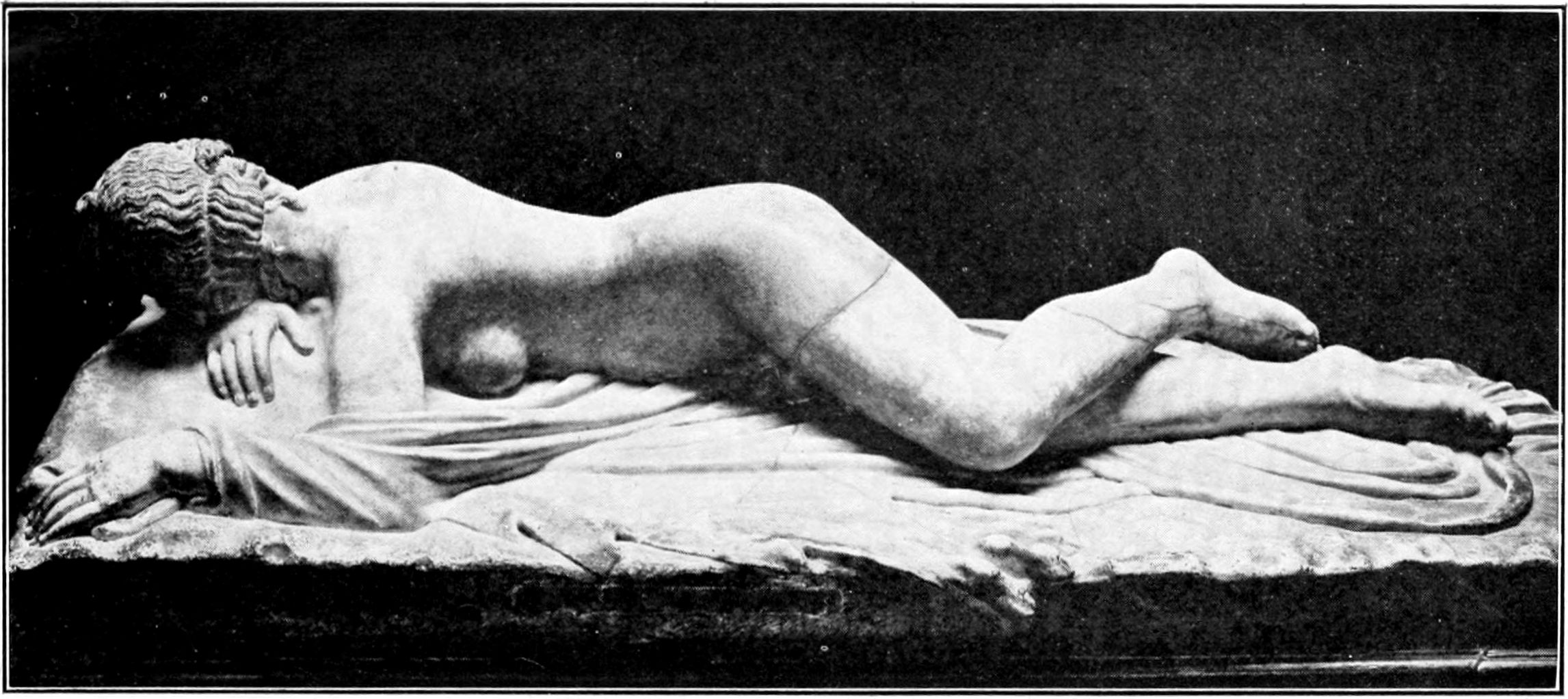
June included this photo of the statue that they were imitating, captioning it "Ancient Greek Statue of an Androgyne, Called 'Hermaphroditos,' Now in the Uffizi Gallery, Florence, Italy"

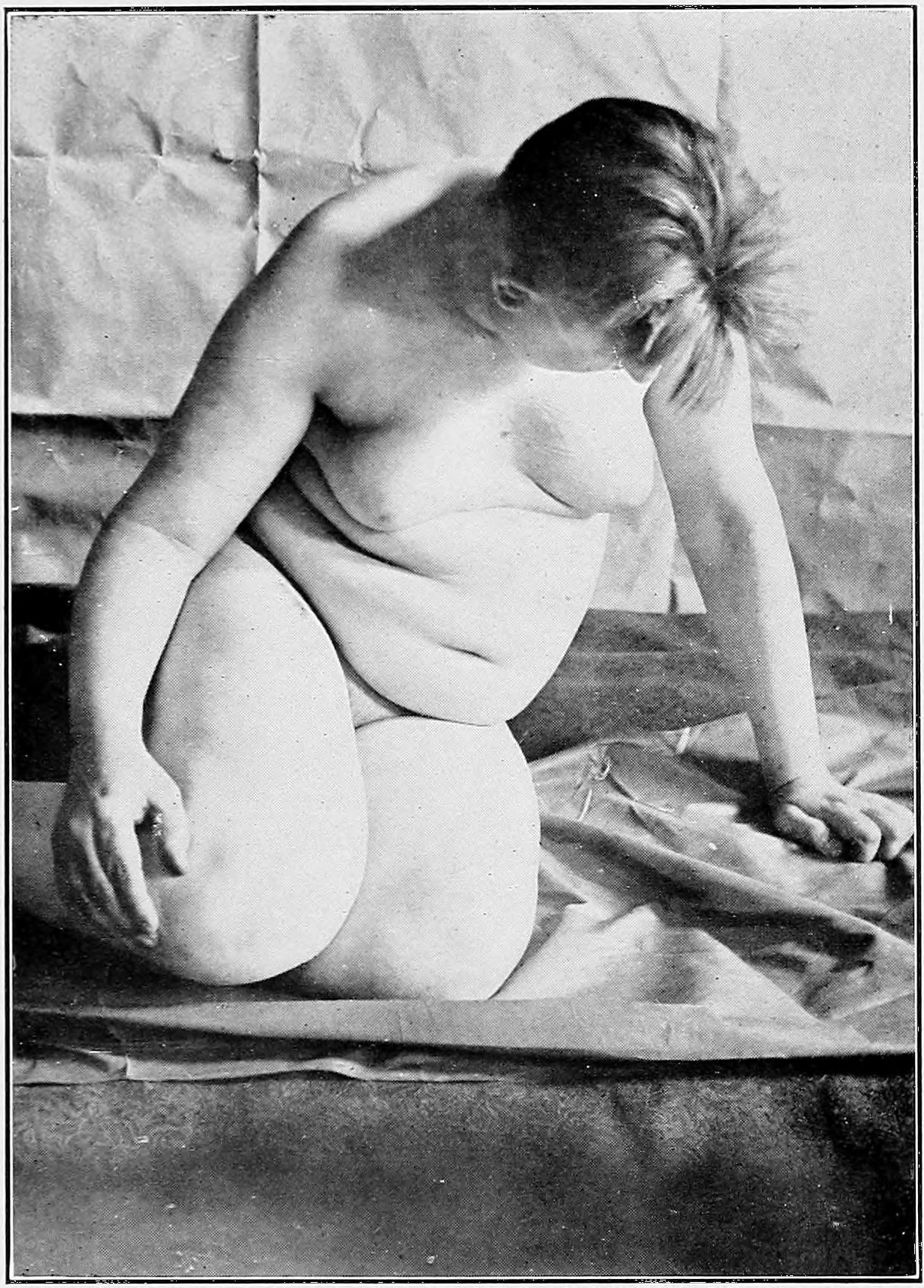
"The Author at Forty-four"

== See also ==
- The Public Universal Friend, an 18th-century genderless preacher from a religious family in New England
- History of transgender people in the United States
