= June Fletcher =

American journalist

June Fletcher is an American business and financial writer for The Naples Daily News. Her beat focuses on business, finance and real estate.

She formerly was a business and real estate reporter for The Wall Street Journal.

== Early life and education ==
Fletcher was named Miss Bikini USA before entering Princeton University in 1969, the first year of coeducation. She received a bachelor's degree magna cum laude in English from Princeton. She also holds a master's degree from Oxford University in English.

== Career ==
Fletcher was the "House Talk" columnist for WSJ.com from 2005 to 2008. Before becoming a columnist for The Wall Street Journal (WSJ), she was a staff reporter for 13 years. She is a regular contributor to the WSJ's "Weekend Journal", and is the columnist for House Talk. She is also a contributing writer for The Daily Beast, Yahoo!, and Financial Planning magazine. Before working for the WSJ, she was a senior editor at Builder magazine. She was Home Front reporter for The Wall Street Journal from 1995 to 2008.

== Works ==
Fletcher is the author of a consumer book on buying and selling real estate titled House Poor, published by Collins.
