= June Clark (nurse) =

British nurse and academic (1941–2025)

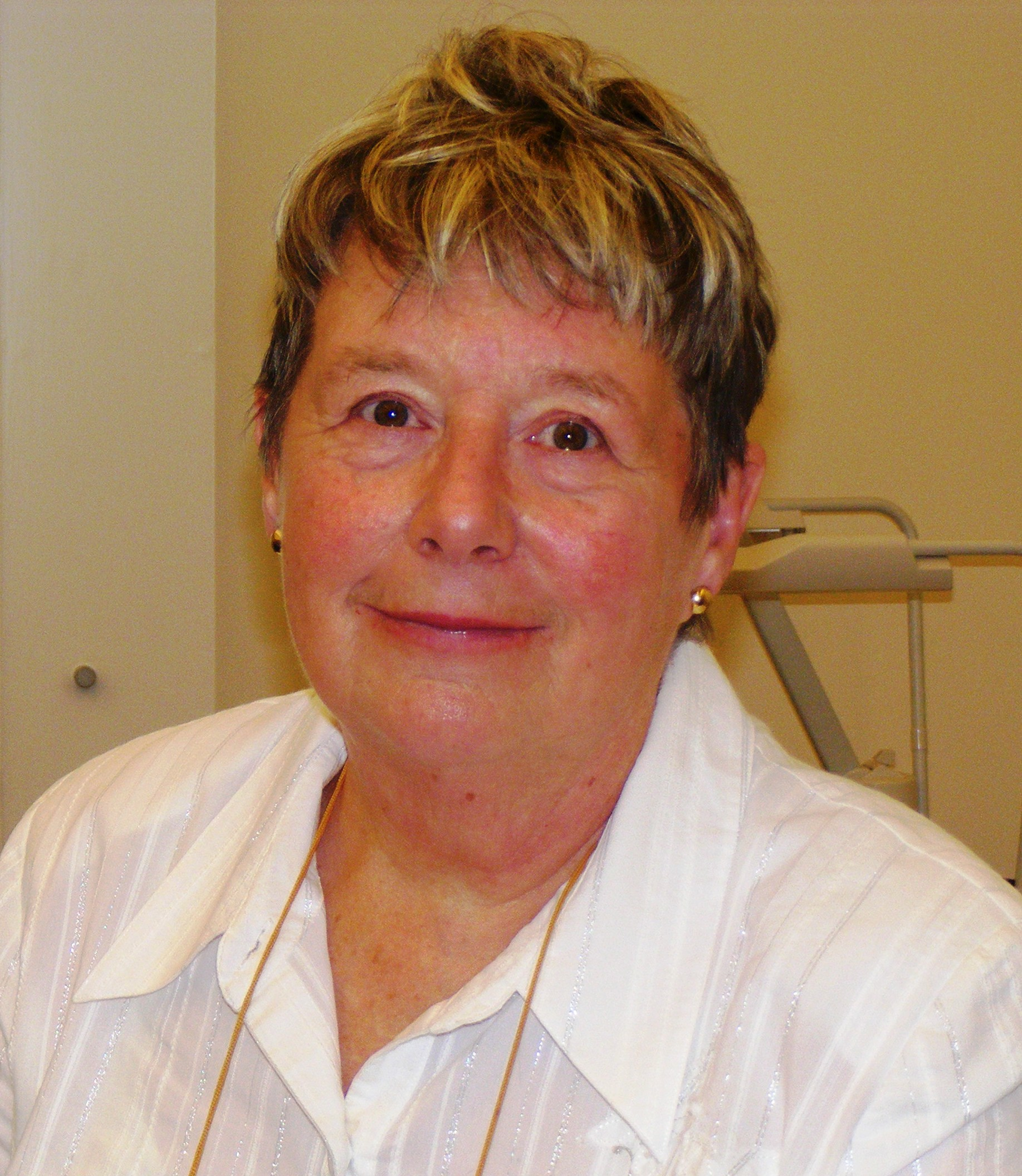
- Born: 31 May 1941; Sheffield, South Yorkshire, England
- Died: 14 May 2025 (aged 83)

Academic background
- Education: University of London; University College Hospital; University of Reading; South Bank Polytechnic

Academic work
- Discipline: Nursing
- Institutions: Middlesex University; Swansea University

Dame Margaret June Clark, DBE FRCN FAAN FLSW (31 May 1941 – 14 May 2025) was a British nurse and academic who was Professor Emeritus of Community Nursing, at Swansea University in Wales.

== Life and career ==
Before qualifying as a nurse, Clark studied Classics as an undergraduate, receiving a BA degree from the University of London.

Before her retirement in 2003, Clark was responsible for the development of a programme of research in community health nursing and primary health care at Swansea University. Her special interest was the development and use of standardised nomenclatures to describe nursing practice, in particular in primary health care. In 1990, she left the NHS and went into higher education as Professor of Nursing to start a new School of Nursing at Middlesex University. In 1997, she "went home to Wales" as the first professor of nursing at Swansea University.

During the 1990s, she was consultant to the International Council of Nurses' project to develop an International Classification of Nursing Practice (ICNP). She was deputy president of the Welsh Nursing Academy. Clark qualified as a nurse at University College Hospital, London, after obtaining an honours degree in Classics at the University of London.

Clark worked as a health visitor, and remained in community nursing as a manager, professor, and political advocate for nearly 40 years. She obtained her MPhil degree at the University of Reading in 1972, and her PhD degree from South Bank Polytechnic in 1985 on the importance of health visiting.

She was heavily involved in nursing at an international level. Following the break-up of the Soviet Union, she worked to help develop nursing leadership in Kazakhstan and Romania. She was a visiting professor at the University of Primorska, Slovenia. She was a frequent speaker at international conferences, had participated in numerous international task groups and workshops, had acted as consultant to the WHO and the ICN, and had represented the UK on ICN and European Union committees. In 2001, she was the keynote speaker of the 'Anna Reynvaan Lecture' in Amsterdam, The Netherlands.

Clark was an active member of Sigma Theta Tau International, and was instrumental in establishing the Upsilon-Xi Chapter in Wales – the first in the UK and only the third in Europe and was STTI Board member from 2009 to 2011.

She was an RCN activist since her student days and has held many leadership roles in the RCN, including serving as president from 1990 to 1994.

Clark died on 14 May 2025, at the age of 83.

== Legacy ==
- The June Clark Travel Scholarship Trust

== Honours ==
In 1995, Clark was appointed Dame Commander of the Order of the British Empire (DBE) for her services to nursing.

She was made a Fellow of the Royal College of Nursing in 1982.

Clark was awarded the RCN Award of Merit in 1996.

She was elected a Fellow of the Learned Society of Wales in 2012.
