= June Pallot =

New Zealand professor of accounting and architect (1953–2004)

- Born: September 1953
- Died: 5 November 2004 (aged 51)
- Awards: New Zealand Suffrage Centennial Medal; Fellow of the New Zealand Institute of Chartered Accountants

Academic background
- Education: University of Auckland; Victoria University of Wellington

June Pallot (September 1953 – 5 November 2004) was a New Zealand professor of accounting at the University of Canterbury, and a registered architect. She was an international expert in public sector accounting, and was known for her overview of public sector reforms.

== Academic career ==
Pallot initially trained as an architect, graduating with a Bachelor of Architecture from the University of Auckland, where she was in the so-called 'pioneer class', the first year to have a significant number of women. After graduation she worked for Don Donnithorne in Christchurch, and registered as an architect in 1978, but then moved to Wellington in 1979 to study accounting at Victoria University of Wellington. After completing her qualification, she joined the faculty, placing her in Wellington at a period of significant public sector reform. Pallot specialised in public sector accounting. In 1996 she joined the staff of the University of Canterbury. She was a Visiting Fellow at the University of Edinburgh, and advised on reform of government accounting and budgeting in Scotland and Japan.

Pallot was a member of the Telecom Establishment Board from 1986 to 1991. From 1993 to 1995 she was also seconded to the Audit Office as Assistant Auditor General.

== Awards and honours ==
Pallot was awarded a New Zealand Suffrage Centennial Medal in 1993. Pallot was honoured as a Fellow of the New Zealand Institute of Chartered Accountants in 1995. She was a member of the Public Sector Accounting Committee, Financial Reporting Committee, Financial Reporting Standards Board and Society of Local Government Managers.

Pallot died of breast cancer on 5 November 2004, aged 51. The University of Canterbury named a lecture series in honour of Pallot, and her most influential work was brought together in a book The Legacy of June Pallot: Public Sector Financial Management Reform, published in 2009. The August 2005 issue of Financial Accountability & Management was dedicated to her memory.

== Personal life ==
Pallot was married to architect Graeme Craigie, who she had met during her architectural training.

== Selected works ==
- Newberry, Susan; Pallot, June (1 August 2003). "Fiscal (ir)responsibility: privileging PPPs in New Zealand". Accounting, Auditing & Accountability Journal. 16 (3): 467–492. doi:10.1108/09513570310482318. ISSN 0951-3574.
- Pallot, J (1998). "New public management reform in New Zealand: The collective strategy phase". International Public Management Journal. 1 (1): 1–18. doi:10.1016/s1096-7494(99)80083-x. ISSN 1096-7494.
- Boston, Jonathan (2002). Public management : the New Zealand model. Oxford University Press. ISBN 0-19-558325-6. OCLC 636090055.
- Pallot, June (2000), "New Forms of Accountability in New Zealand: Challenges for Public Sector Audit", Neues öffentliches Rechnungswesen, Wiesbaden: Gabler Verlag, pp. 105–128, doi:10.1007/978-3-663-05866-3_5, ISBN 978-3-663-05867-0
- Jackson, Keith; Boston, Jonathon; Martin, John; Pallot, June; Walsh, Pat (November 1993). "Capitalist Bureaucracy in New Zealand". Public Administration Review. 53 (6): 578. doi:10.2307/977371. ISSN 0033-3352. JSTOR 977371.
