= Joon (Korean name) =

Korean given name

Joon (Korean: 준), also spelled Jun, Chun, or June, is a rare Korean family name, as well as a Korean given name.

== As a family name ==
The family name Joon is written with only one hanja, meaning (俊). The 2000 South Korean Census found 72 people with this family name. All belonged to one clan, from Cheongju.

== As a given name ==
People with the given name Joon include:

- Heo Jun (c. 1537 – 1615), Joseon dynasty court physician
- Yi Tjoune (1859–1907), late Joseon dynasty and Korean Empire diplomat
- Choe Jun (1884–1970), South Korean businessman
- Oh Joon (born 1955), South Korean diplomat
- Heo Jun (television personality) (born 1977), South Korean television personality
- Jung Joon (born 1979), South Korean actor
- Mun Jun (born 1982), South Korean speed skater
- Park June (born 1986), South Korean professional computer gamer
- Kwon Jun (born 1987), South Korean footballer
- Ahn Jun (fl. 2000s), South Korean photographer

People with the stage name "Joon" include:

- Kim Joon (born Kim Hyung-joon, born 1984), South Korean rapper, former member of boy group T-max
- Lee Joon (born Lee Chang-sun, born 1988), South Korean singer, former member of boy group MBLAQ
- Jun. K (born Kim Min-joon, born 1988), South Korean singer-songwriter, member of boy group 2PM

== See also ==
- Pieter Joon (born 1942), Dutch athlete, founder of World Organization Volleyball for Disabled
- Joon Wolfsberg (born 1992), German singer-songwriter
