= Shun (given name) =

- Gender: Male

Origin
- Origin: Japanese
- Meaning: Different meanings depending on the kanji used

Shun (written: 旬, 駿, 俊, 峻, 舜, 隼 or 瞬) is a masculine Japanese given name. Notable people with the name include:

- Shun Fujimoto (藤本 俊; born 1950), Japanese gymnast
- Shun Ito (伊東 俊; born 1987), Japanese footballer
- Shun Iwasa (岩佐 俊), Japanese general
- Shun Ishikawa (石川 駿; born 1990), Japanese professional baseball infielder
- Shun Horie (堀江 瞬; born 1993), Japanese voice actor
- Shun Kuwahara (桑原 俊; born 1981), Japanese gymnast
- Shun Medoruma (目取真 俊; born 1960), Japanese writer
- Shun Morishita (森下 俊; born 1986), Japanese footballer
- Shun Nagasawa (長沢 駿; born 1988), Japanese footballer
- Shun Nakahara (中原 俊; born 1951), Japanese film director
- Shun Nakamura (footballer) (中村 駿; born 1994), Japanese footballer
- Shun Nogaito (野垣内 俊; born 1986), Japanese footballer
- Shun Oguri (小栗 旬; born 1982), Japanese actor, voice actor and film director
- Shun Sato (figure skater) (佐藤 駿; born 2004), Japanese figure skater
- Shun Sato (footballer) (佐藤 隼; born 1997), Japanese footballer
- Shun Sugata (菅田 俊; born 1955), Japanese actor
- Shun Tono (東野 峻; born 1986), Japanese baseball player
- Shun Yamaguchi (山口 俊; born 1987), Japanese baseball player
- Shun Yashiro (八代 駿; 1933–2003), Japanese actor and voice actor

== Fictional characters ==
- Shun Aonuma, a character from the novel and anime series From the New World
- Shun, a support character in the Japanese RPG Ar Tonelico II
- Shun Di, a fictional Drunken Kung Fu Master in Virtua Fighter Series
- Andromeda Shun, a main character in the anime series Saint Seiya
- Shun Ibusaki, a character in the manga series Shokugeki no Soma
- Shun Izuki, a character in the manga series Kuroko no Basuke
- Shun Kaidou, a character in the manga series Saiki Kusuo no Sai-nan
- Shun Kazama, a main character in the Studio Ghibli film From Up on Poppy Hill
- Shun Kazami, a character in the anime series Bakugan
- Shun Kenzaki, A Character from the YouTube Series Origin, portrayed by Sen Mitsuji
- Shun Namiki, a character in the sentai series Denji Sentai Megaranger
- Shun Nitta, a character in the anime series Captain Tsubasa
- Shun Hashimoto, a main character in the family BL manga series L'étranger
- Shun, a boss character in the 2024 Nintendo Switch game Mario & Luigi: Brothership
- Shun Akiyama, a character in the game series Yakuza/Like a Dragon
