= Joon Wolfsberg =

German singer-songwriter (born 1992)

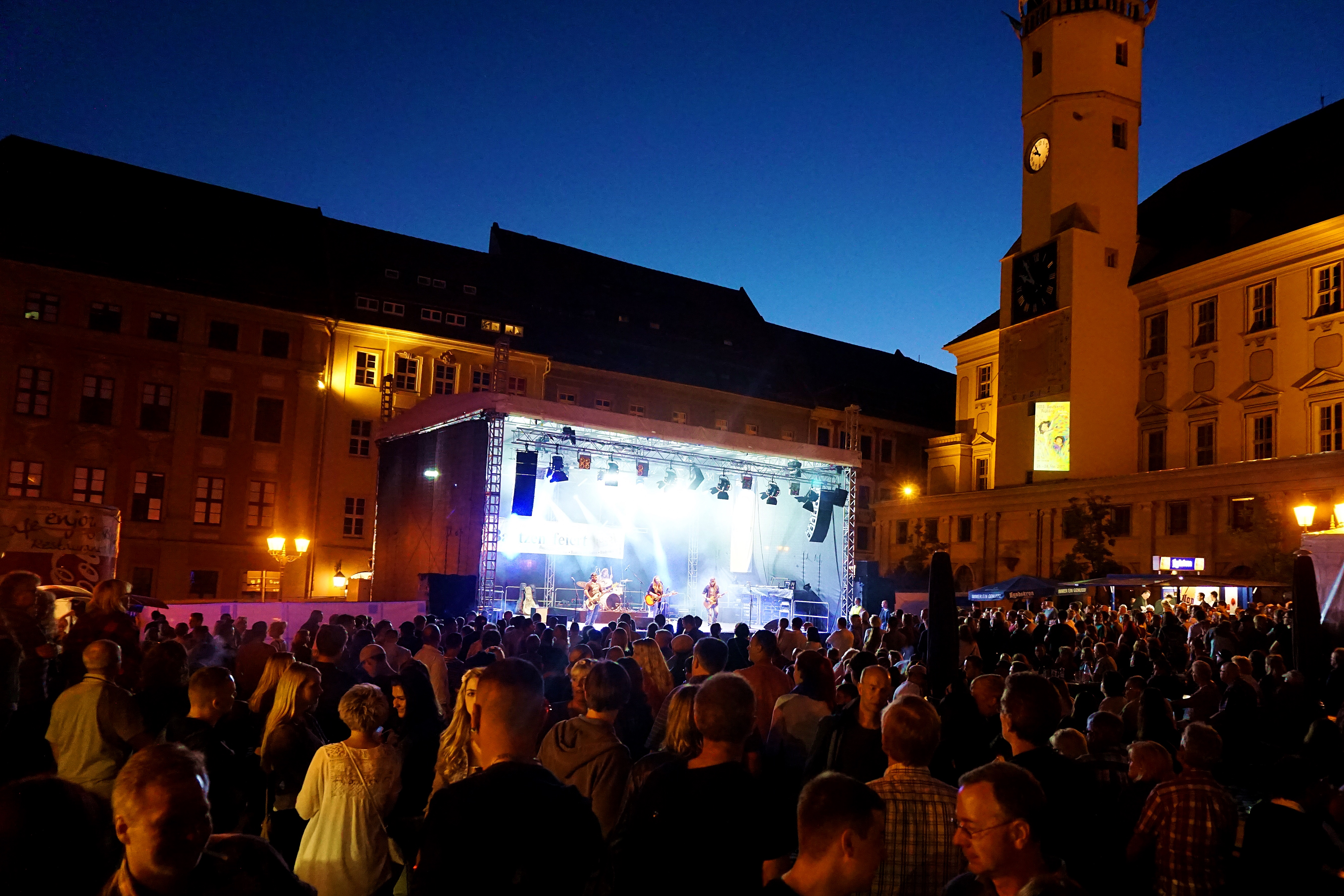
- Joon Wolfsberg performing in 2017.

Background information
- Also known as: Joon Wolfsberg Band
- Origin: Erfurt, Thuringia, Germany
- Genres: Alternative rock
- Years active: 2012–present
- Label: Cow Universe Records
- Members: Joon Wolfsberg; Joe Wolfsberg; Toni Funk; Michael Nowatzky
- Website: www.joon-wolfsberg.com

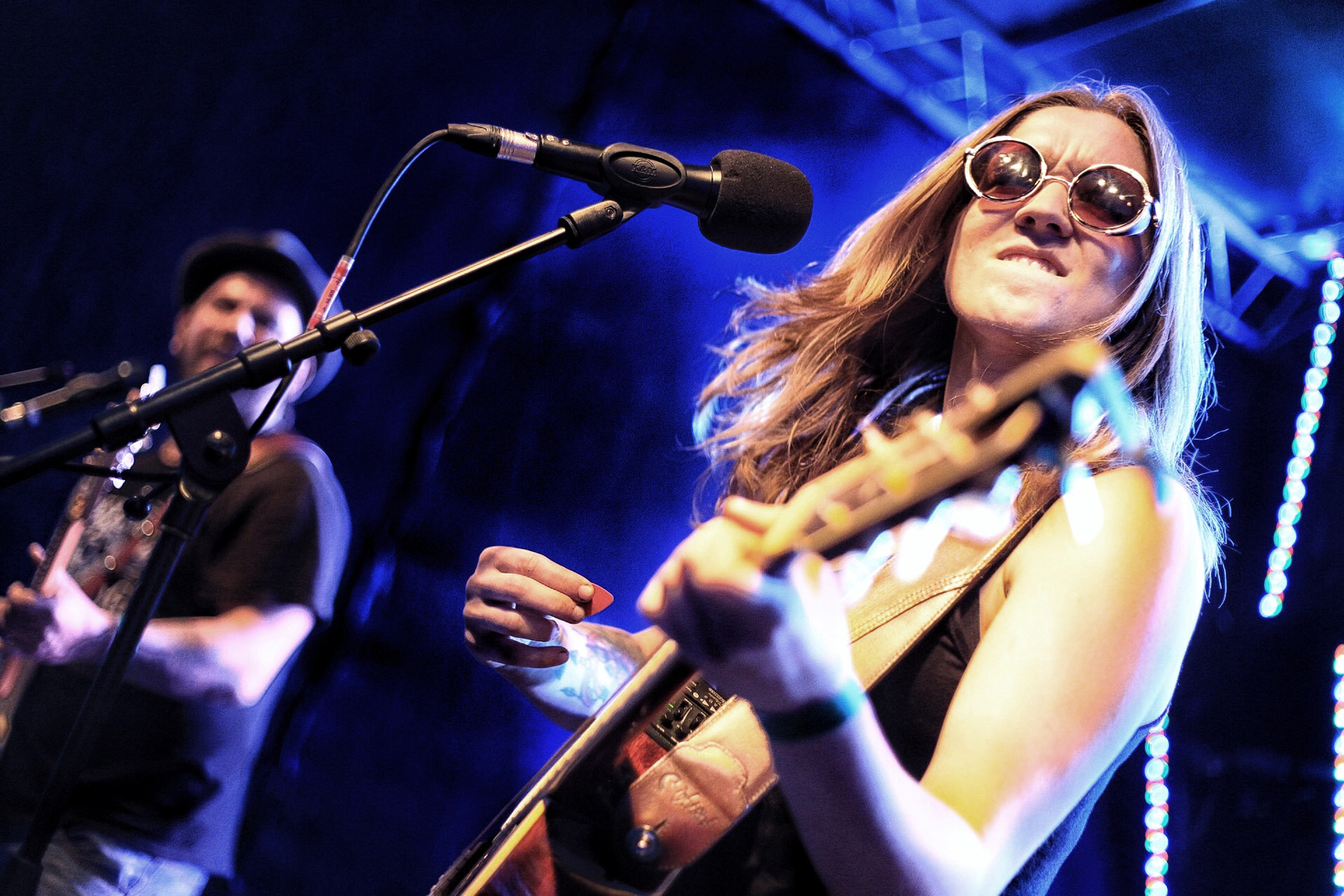
Joon Wolfsberg Live in 2015.

Joon Wolfsberg (born March 8, 1992) is a German singer-songwriter, best known as the lead vocalist, songwriter, and name giver of the band "Joon Wolfsberg“

== Live ==
She was introduced to music at the age of 6, taking piano, drums and singing lessons at the public music school Erfurt in Germany. At the age of 15 she taught herself how to play the guitar. After high school in 2010 she completely dedicated herself to music. At this time she already performed her own songs on the street as a street musician.

=== Career ===
In 2007 with the age of 15 she began to write her own songs. In 2008 Joon Wolfsberg composed a song for a project from the singer Will.I.Am of the Black Eyed Peas, at this time she still worked under the artist name „Joon W.“ Since 2010 she writes all her songs together with her dad Joe Wolfsberg (who also is the producer of all the records she made)

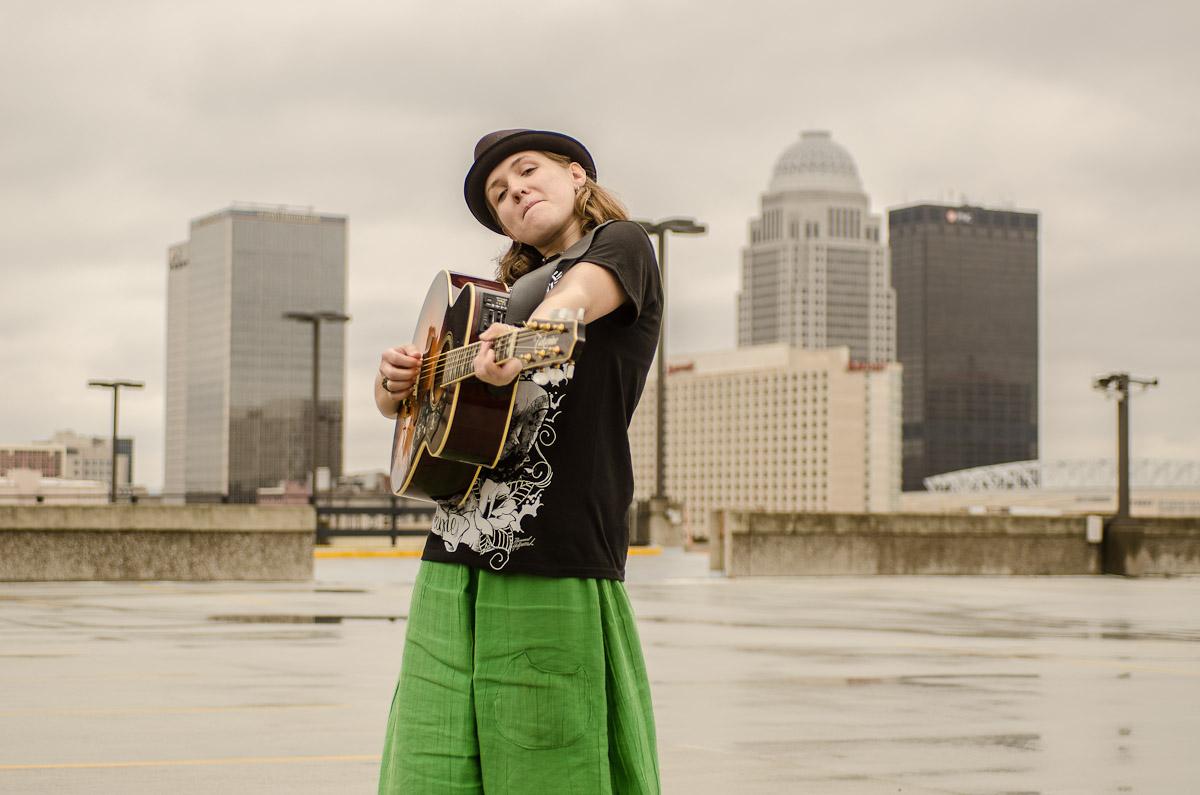
Joon Wolfsberg, March 2012

In January 2011 she recorded her debut album „Made In USA“ in the „Tracking Room Studios“ in Nashville together with Dave Roe (last bass player of Johnny Cash), Buddy Hyatt (piano player at Toto), Shawn Fichter (drummer of Peter Frampton), Smith Curry (guitar player of Kid Rock) and Bobby Terry (Guitar Player for Amy Grant).

The record „Made In USA“ was released on April 1, 2011 as digital version and on May 14, 2011 as physical copy. The single „Please“ received 'hot rotation airplay' on Radio Swiss Pop and became very well known among the Swiss. It continued to get airplay.

The „Made in USA“ album got a lot attention and was also shared in the music scene of Los Angeles. In this way the connection to the band members of Blind Melon, Brad Smith (Bass) and Christopher Thorn (guitar) and Dave Krusen (first drummer of Pearl Jam) took place. With them she recorded her second album „Wonderland“ again in the „Tracking Room Stuios“ Nashville /TN in 2012.

The Financial Times Germany elected the Wonderland Album to be the album of the week on June 3, 2012 and gave it 5 out of 5 points.

In the end of 2012 Joon Wolfsberg founded her first band in Germany. In 2013 she recorded the third album „Revolujoon“ and in 2014 the fourth album „The Deluxe Underdog“ together with her new band members Toni Funk (guitar) and Michael Nowatzky (drums) in a german recording studio.

Rolling Stone elected the album „The Deluxe Underdog“ to be on place 9 out of the 52 worst albums of 2014.

== International Critics ==
Joon Wolfsberg wurde zwar in Köln geboren und wuchs in Erfurt auf – klingt aber ziemlich international. Irgendwo zwischen der Jefferson-Airplane-Sängerin Grace Slick, Folkrock-Elementen und ganz viel Joon Wolfsberg singt sich die von ihrem Vater produzierte 20-jährige Newcomerin durch echte Ohrwürmer. Einige ihrer Songs wie ‚Big Fish‘ oder ‚Free Your Mind haben‘ sogar Chartqualitäten. Gut – die Texte sind nicht immer das Gelbe vom Ei, aber geschenkt: Hier steht die Musik im Vordergrund. […]

— Willy Theobald - July 3rd 2012

Doch wenn man ihren ins Alt driftenden Gesang und den zwischen abgeklärtem Folk-Rock und in Nostalgie badenden Alternativ-Rock-Sound ihrer Band vernimmt, könnte man meinen, die Dame hätte schon viel mehr hinter sich als zwei Dekaden Leben.

— Ostsee-Zeitung.de

Joon Wolfsberg ‚The Deluxe Underdog‘: 1,5 Sterne. Halb Totenkopf, halb Rock-Chick – die Erfurterin müht sich an großem Blues-Rock ab.

— Fabian Broicher - December 9th 2014

Save Him ‚1220 Wells Street‘: Tipping A Hat To The Past Whilst Creating A Glorious Future - They say that those who don’t learn from the past are doomed to repeat it, Joon and her musical gang prove that it is by learning from the past that they get a hand in writing music’s next chapter and it is a chapter that fans of songs built on integrity and honest are going to revel in.

— A&R Factory - February 7th 2018

== Discography ==
- Green Boots (Demo Album) (2010)
- Made in USA (2011)
- Wonderland (2012)
- Revolujoon (2013)
- The Deluxe Underdog (2014)
- 1220 Wells Street (2017)
