= Joon (Chinese name) =

俊
- Gender: Male
- Languages: Chinese, Cantonese, Hakka

Origin
- Language: Old Chinese
- Origin: 俊
- Derivation: This character was first seen in Xiaozhuan The whole word means a person who can use the power of others to realize his ideals. This gives rise to the meaning of a leader, and by extension means that the ability and wisdom are beyond ordinary people. "Mencius Gongsun Chou Shang": "Respect the virtuous and make the Junjie reign." It also refers to the ability and wisdom.
- Meaning: "talented, handsome" (which is usually only masculine).

Other names
- Related names: 君, 隽, 軍, Related to Korean Jun and Joon and Japanese Joon.

Joon
- Chinese: 俊
Transcriptions
Standard Mandarin
- Hanyu Pinyin: Jùn
Hakka
- Pha̍k-fa-sṳ: zǔn
Yue: Cantonese
- Jyutping: zun4
Southern Min
- Bbánlám Pìngyīm: zung3

Joon, also Jun is commonly Chinese given name written as 俊 in Southeast Asia such as Malaysia and Singapore and less commonly used in China and Taiwan. Currently there are no records of how many people are named Joon.

== List of Chinese given name Joon ==
- Cheong Jun Hoong (張俊虹) - a Malaysian diver.
- Mak Joon Wah - a Malaysian physician.
- He Jun - a Chinese former basketball player.
- He Jun - a Chinese wheelchair curler.
- Liu Jun (刘隽) - a Malaysian choreographer, dancer and singer.
- Leong Jun Hao (梁峻豪) - a Malaysian badminton player.
- Wen Junhui (文俊辉) - professionally known by his stage name Jun (준), is a Chinese singer, rapper, dancer, actor, model and songwriter based in South Korea.
- Lin Jun Jie (林俊杰) - better known by his stage name JJ Lin, is a Singaporean singer, songwriter, record producer, and actor.
- Yeo Jun Wei (姚俊威 or 杨俊伟)
- Gong Jun (龚俊) - also known as Simon Gong, is a Chinese actor and model.
- Hu Jun (胡軍) - a Chinese actor best known for playing dramatic roles in various films and television series.
- Lin Yanjun (林彦俊) - also known as Evan Lin, is a Taiwanese singer, rapper and actor.
- Di Jun (帝俊) - also known as Emperor Jun is one of the ancient supreme deities of China.
- Zhu Jun (host) (朱军) - also known as Deon Zhu is a Chinese host and actor.
