= June (Basque given name) =

June is a Basque female given name meaning 'place of the reeds'. The first records of this name appear in the Middle Ages. For example, there was one woman named June Juneiz in Pamplona in the 12th century.

== Notable people ==
- June Crespo (born 1982), Spanish artist
- June Fernández (born 1984), Spanish journalist
