= Jun (given name) =

- Pronunciation: [d͡ʑɯᵝɴ]
- Gender: Unisex

Origin
- Origin: Japanese
- Meaning: It can have many different meanings depending on the kanji used.

Other names
- Related names: Junko; Jun'ichi; Junji

Jun (じゅん, ジュン) is a Japanese given name used by either gender.

== Written forms ==
Jun can be written using different kanji characters and can mean:

- 純, "genuine/pure"
- 潤, "moisture"
- 淳, "pure/genuine"
- 順, "obey"
- 準, "conform to/consult with"
- 洵, "truth"
- 隼, "falcon"

The name can also be written in hiragana or katakana.

== People with the name ==
- Jun (musician), Japanese musician
- Jun Akiyama (準, born 1969), Japanese wrestler
- Jun Akiyama (秋山 淳, born 1973), Japanese video game developer
- Jun Ando (安藤 淳; born 1984), Japanese footballer
- Jun Aonami (蒼波 純; born 2001), Japanese actress
- Jun Aoyama (隼, born 1988), Japanese football player
- Jun Ashida (淳, 1930–2018), Japanese fashion designer
- Jun Azumi (淳, born 1962), Japanese politician
- Jun Banaag (born 1951), Filipino radio anchor
- Jun Endo (遠藤 純; born 2000), Japanese women's footballer
- Jun Etō (淳, 1933–1999), Japanese literary critic
- Jun Falkenstein (淳, 1969), Japanese-American animation director
- Jun Fan (Bruce Lee) (振, 1940–1973), martial artist, actor, philosopher
- Jun Fubuki (ジュン, born 1952), Japanese actress
- Jun Fukuda (純, 1923–2000), Japanese director
- Jun Fukushima (福島 潤, born 1976), Japanese voice actor and narrator
- Jun Fukuyama (福山 潤, born 1978), Japanese voice actor and singer
- Jun Hatanaka (畑中 純; 1950–2012), Japanese manga artist
- Jun Hayashi (潤, born 1972), Japanese politician
- Jun Ichikawa (準, 1948–2008), Japanese film director and screenwriter
- Jun Inoue (井上 順; born 1947), Japanese television personality, singer, actor and comedian
- Jun Ishikawa (author) (淳, 1899–1987), Japanese author, translator and literary critic
- Jun Ishikawa (composer) (石川 淳, Ishikawa Jun, born 1964), a Japanese composer who was formerly employed at game company HAL Laboratory, best known for composing for the Kirby series
- Jun Itoda (潤, born 1972), Japanese comedian
- Jun Izumida (純, born 1965), Japanese wrestler
- Jun Kaname (潤, born 1981), Japanese actor
- Jun Kaneko (born 1942), Japanese ceramic artist
- Jun Kasai (純, born 1974), Japanese wrestler
- Jun Kasama (笠間淳; born 1984), Japanese voice actor
- Jun Kato (加藤 純; born 1980), Japanese tennis player
- Jun Kawada (順, 1882–1962), Japanese tanka poet and entrepreneur
- Jun Kobayashi (小林 洵; born 1999), Japanese footballer
- Jun Kondo (淳, born 1930), Japanese theoretical physicist
- Jun Konno (潤, born 1967), Japanese judoka
- Jun Konno (voice actor) (金野 潤, Konno Jun, born 1975)
- Jun Maki (準, 1948–2009), Japanese copywriter
- Jun Masuo (遵, born 1986), Japanese actor
- Jun Matsumoto (潤, born 1983), member of the J-pop group Arashi
- Jun Miki (淳, 1919–1992), Japanese photographer
- Jun Mitsuhashi (三橋 淳; born 1932), Japanese entomologist
- Jun Miyake (純, born 1958), Japanese composer
- Jun Mizusawa (潤, born 1989), Japanese voice actress
- Jun Morinaga (純, born 1937), Japanese photographer
- Jun Mochizuki (淳), Japanese mangaka
- Jun Murai (純, born 1955), Japanese computer scientist
- Jun Murakami (淳, born 1973), Japanese actor
- Jun Nagai (純, born 1944), Japanese middle-distance runner
- Jun Nagao (淳, born 1964), Japanese composer
- Jun Nagura (潤, born 1968), Japanese comedian and actor
- Jun Natsukawa (純, born 1980), Japanese gravure idol
- Jun Nishikawa (JRA member) (西川 純; born 1950), Japanese communist and hijacker
- Jun Nishikawa (footballer) (西川 潤; born 2002), Japanese footballer
- Jun Onose (潤), better known as J, Japanese musician
- Jun Osakada (淳, born 1974), Japanese sprinter
- Jun John Sakurai (純), Japanese American particle physicist and theorist
- Jun Sawada (born 1955), Japanese businessman, CEO of Nippon Telegraph and Telephone
- Jun Seba (淳, 1974-2010), Japanese hip hop producer
- Jun Sena (じゅん, born 1974), Japanese musical actress of Takarazuka Revue
- Jun Senoue (純, born 1970), Japanese video game composer and musician
- Jun Shibata (淳, born 1976), Japanese pop singer-songwriter
- Jun Shibuki (淳, born 1968), Japanese musical actress and performer
- Jun Shiraoka (順, born 1944), Japanese photographer
- Jun Suemi (純, born 1959), Japanese illustrator
- Jun Tanaka (poet) (純, 1890–1966), Japanese poet
- Jun Tanaka (chef), British Japanese chef
- Jun Takami (順, 1907–1965), Japanese novelist and poet
- Jun Takeuchi (潤), Japanese video game director and producer
- Jun Togawa (純, born 1961), Japanese singer, musician and actress
- Jun Ushiroku (淳, 1884–1973), general in the Imperial Japanese Army
- Jun Yamaguchi (淳, born 1967), Japanese composer
- Jun Yamashita (山下 潤; born 1997), Japanese sprinter
- Jun Yamazaki (born 1956), Japanese diplomat
- Wakanami Jun (順, 1941–2007), Japanese sumo wrestler

== Fictional characters ==
- Jun Aoi (ジュン), a character in Martian Successor Nadesico series
- Jun Himeya, a character in Ultraman Nexus
- Jun Hono (ジュン), a character in the works of manga artist Go Nagai
- Jun Isashiki (純), a character in Ace of Diamond
- Jun Kazama (準), a character in the Tekken fighting games
- Jun Fudo, the protagonist of Devil Lady
- Jun Sakurada (ジュン), the protagonist of the anime series Rozen Maiden
- Jun Sazanami (ジュン), a character from the Japanese franchise Ensemble Stars!
- Jun Shiomi (汐見 潤), a character from the Food Wars!: Shokugeki no Soma manga and anime series
- Jun Suzuki (鈴木 純), a character in the K-On! manga and anime series
- Jun Kurosu (淳), a character in Persona 2
- Jun Kazari (飾利 潤), a character in the Magia Record mobile game for the Puella Magi Madoka Magica anime franchise
- Jun Motomiya (ジュン), a character in Digimon Adventure 02
- Jun Yabuki (ジュン) or Yellow Four II, a character in the Super Sentai series Choudenshi Bioman
- Jun Yamamoto (純), a character in Special A
- Jun Yamano (純), a character in the Yoroiden-Samurai Troopers series
- Jun (ジュン), a character in the anime Pokémon appearing in DP episode 101
- Jun Manjoume (準), a character in Yu-Gi-Oh! GX
- Jun-A266, A Spartan soldier in Halo: Reach
- Jun Ushiro (宇白 順), a character in Bokurano: Ours
- Jun Naruse (成瀬 順), a character in The Anthem of the Heart
- Tao Jun, a character in Shaman King
- Jun Sato, a character in Star Wars Rebels
- Jun Kiyama, a character in Denshi Sentai Denziman
- Jun Shirogane, a character in Princess Connect! Re:Dive

== See also ==
- Iron Virgin Jun, a Japanese manga and OVA series created by Go Nagai
- Jun (disambiguation)
- Jeon (Korean name)
