= Junko =

- Pronunciation: Jú-n-kó
- Gender: Female

Origin
- Origin: Japanese
- Meaning: different meanings depending on the kanji used

Other names
- Related names: Jun

Junko is a feminine Japanese given name. It is typically written in kanji, but can be written in hiragana (じゅんこ) or katakana (ジュンコ).

Junko can be written using kanji including:

- 純子, "pure, child"
- 順子, "order, child"
- 淳子, "pure, child"
- 潤子, "rich/favor/wet, child"
- 準子, "conform, child"
- 洵子, "truth, child"

== People ==
- Junko (manga artist) (ぢゅん子), Japanese manga artist
- Junko Abe (阿部純子; born 1993), Japanese actress
- Junko Akimoto (秋元 順子; born 1947), Japanese singer
- Junko Asahina (朝比奈 順子; 1953–2021), Japanese actress and singer
- Junko Asami (麻見 順子; born 1967), Japanese voice actress and narrator
- Junko Asari (浅利 純子; born 1969), Japanese retired marathon runner
- Junko Chodos (born 1939), Japanese-American contemporary artist
- Junko Furuta (古田 順子; 1971–1989), Japanese torture and murder victim
- Junko Hagimori (萩森 侚子; born 1964), Japanese voice actress
- Junko Hiramatsu (平松 純子; born 1942), Japanese former competitive figure skater
- Junko Hirose (広瀬 順子; born 1990), Japanese Paralympic judoka
- Junko Hirotani (広谷 順子; 1956–2020), Japanese singer
- Junko Hori (堀 絢子; born 1942), Japanese actress and voice actress represented by Production Baobab
- Junko Hoshino (星野 純子; born 1989), Japanese skier
- Junko Ikeuchi (池内 淳子; 1933–2010), Japanese actress
- Junko Ishida (石田 順子; born 1966), Japanese former football player
- Junko Isoda (磯田 順子; born 1981), Japanese former swimmer
- Junko Itō (born 1954) American linguist
- Junko Iwao (岩男 潤子; born 1970), Japanese voice actress
- Junko Izumi (和泉 淳子; born 1969), Japanese actress and kyōgen performer
- Junko Karube (軽部 潤子), Japanese manga artist
- Junko Kawada (河田 純子; born 1974), Japanese former J-pop idol, singer-songwriter and actress
- Junko Kawano (河野 純子), Japanese game designer, game director and writer
- Junko Kazukawa (数川 純子; born 1963), Japanese ultrarunner
- Junko Kitamura (born 1956), Japanese ceramic artist
- Junko Kobayashi (小林 順子; 1975–1996), Japanese university student who was murdered
- Junko Kōmura (香村 純子; born 1976), Japanese screenwriter
- Junko Kubo (久保 純子; born 1972), Japanese television announcer
- Junko Kudō, Japanese professional dancer
- Junko Mabuki (麻吹 淳子; born 1955), Japanese retired pink film actress
- Junko Maru (丸 純子; born 1976), Japanese actress
- Junko Matsui (松井 潤子; 1906–1989), Japanese actress
- Junko Maya (真屋 順子; 1942–2017), Japanese actress
- Junko Mihara (三原 じゅん子; born 1964), Japanese actress
- Junko Minagawa (皆川 純子; born 1975), Japanese voice actress
- Junko Mitsuhashi (三橋 順子; born 1955), Japanese social and cultural historian
- Junko Miyashita (宮下 順子; born 1949), Japanese actress
- Junko Miyazono (宮園 純子; born 1943), Japanese actress
- Junko Mizuno (水野 純子; born 1973), Japanese manga artist
- Junko Mori (森 純子; born 1974), Japanese metalwork sculptor
- Junko Mori (composer) (森 潤子; born 1949), Japanese composer
- Junko Moriyama (森山 淳子; born 1975), Japanese retired female volleyball player
- Junko Nishida (西田 順子; born 1915), Japanese high jumper
- Junko Nishimuro (西室 淳子; born 1980), Japanese curler
- Junko Noda (野田 順子; born 1971), Japanese voice actress
- Junko Ogata (緒方 純子; born 1962), Japanese serial killer
- Junko Ohashi (大橋 純子; 1950-2023), Japanese singer
- Junko Okada (岡田 純子; born 1973), Japanese voice actress
- Junko Omote (表 純子; born 1974), Japanese professional golfer
- Junko Onishi (大西 順子; born 1967), Japanese jazz pianist
- Junko Onishi (大西 順子; born 1974), Japanese former butterfly swimmer
- Junko Ozawa (小澤 純子; born 1973), Japanese former football player
- Junko Sakurada (桜田 淳子; born 1958), Japanese singer
- Junko Sakurai (桜井 純子; born 1967), Japanese swimmer
- Junko Sawamatsu (沢松 順子; born 1948), Japanese retired tennis player
- Junko Shigemitsu (born 1949), Japanese-American physicist
- Junko Shimakata (嶋方 淳子; born 1967), Japanese voice actress
- Junko Tabei (田部井 淳子; 1939–2016), first woman to climb Mt. Everest
- Junko Takeuchi (竹内 順子; born 1972), Japanese voice actress
- Junko Tanaka (田中 順子; born 1973), Japanese synchronized swimmer
- Junko Torikai (鳥飼 淳子; born 1975), Japanese former swimmer
- Junko Yagami (八神 純子; born 1958), Japanese singer-songwriter
- Junko Yaginuma (八木沼 純子; born 1973), Japanese former figure skater
- Junko Yamakawa (山川 純子; born 1975), Japanese alpine skier
- Junko Yasui (安井 純子; born 1960), Japanese professional golfer
- Junko Yoshioka, New York City-based fashion designer
- Jungo Morita (森田 淳悟; born 1947), Japanese former volleyball player

== Fictional characters ==
- Junko Enoshima (江ノ島 盾子), character and the main antagonist of the "Hope's Peak Academy" arc in Danganronpa
- Junko Hattori (服部 絢子), character in the light novel series Ichiban Ushiro no Daimaou
- Junko Kaname (鹿目 詢子), character from the anime series Puella Magi Madoka Magica
- Junko Konno, (紺野 純子), character from the MAPPA idol anime series Zombie Land Saga
- Junko Mochida (持田 潤子), minor character in the hentai anime series Bible Black
- Junko Saotome (早乙女淳子), character from Nana
- Junko Asagiri (朝霧 純子), character from Desert Punk
- Junko Takei (竹井醇子), character from Strike Witches
- Junko Wallop, character in the animated television series Storm Hawks
- Junko (純狐), character in Legacy of Lunatic Kingdom from Touhou Project
- Ibara Junko, character in Megatokyo
