= Junji =

- Gender: Male

Origin
- Origin: Japanese
- Meaning: It can have many different meanings depending on the kanji used.

Other names
- Related names: Jun; Jun'ichi; Jun'ichirō; Junko

Junji (じゅんじ, ジュンジ) is a common masculine Japanese given name.

== Written forms ==
Junji can be written using different kanji characters and can mean:

- 純二, "chaste, two"
- 純次, "chaste, next"
- 純治, "chaste, govern"
- 淳司, "pure, conduct"
- 淳次, "pure, next"
- 準二, "conform, two"
- 准次, "associate, next"
- 順二, "sequence, two"
- 順治, "sequence, govern"
- 潤次, "moisture, next"

The name can also be written in hiragana or katakana.

== People ==
- Junji Arias (born 1976), Filipino singer and songwriter
- Junji Fukuhara (福原 淳嗣; born 1967), Japanese politician
- Junji Hasegawa (長谷川 淳二; born 1968), Japanese politician
- Junji Higashi (東 順治; 1946–2023), Japanese politician
- Junji Hirata (平田 淳嗣; born 1956), Japanese retired professional wrestler
- Junji Hoshino (星野 順治; born 1974), Japanese former professional baseball pitcher
- Junji Ishiwatari (いしわたり 淳治; born 1977), Japanese musician, songwriter and record producer
- Junji Ito (伊藤 潤二; born 1963), Japanese horror manga artist
- Junji Ito (fighter) (伊藤 淳二; born 1986), Japanese retired mixed martial artist
- Junji Kawano (川野 淳次; born 1945), Japanese former football player
- Junji Kinoshita (木下 順二; 1914–2006), Japanese playwright
- Junji Koizumi (小泉 淳嗣; born 1968), Japanese former football player
- Junji Kunishige (國重 純二; 1942–2013), Japanese scholar and translator
- Junji Majima (間島 淳司; born 1978), Japanese voice actor
- Junji Nishikawa (西川 潤之; 1907–????), Japanese football player
- Junji Nishime (西銘 順治; 1921–2001), Japanese politician
- Junji Nishimura (西村 純二; born 1955), Japanese anime director and producer
- Junji Nishizawa (西澤 淳二; born 1974), Japanese former football player
- Junji Ogawa (小川 淳司; born 1957), Japanese Nippon Professional Baseball player
- Junji Sakamoto (阪本 順治; born 1958), Japanese film director
- Junji Suzuki (鈴木 淳司; born 1958), Japanese former politician
- Junji Takada (高田 純次; born 1947), Japanese actor and comedian
- Junji Tanigawa (谷川 じゅんじ; born 1965), Japanese artist, product and spatial designer
- Junji Watanabe (渡部 惇二; born 1944), Japanese boxer
- Junji Yamamichi (山道 淳司; born 1994), Japanese footballer
- Junji Yamauchi (山内 潤治), Japanese electrical engineer
- Junji Yayoshi (弥吉 淳二; 1968–2018), Japanese guitarist and record producer
- Junji Yuasa (湯浅 純二; born 1944), Japanese diver

== Characters ==
- Junji Manda (じゅんじ), a character in the anime series Ojamajo Doremi
- Junji, a character in the Adventures on the Orange Islands season of the Pokémon anime series. Known in the dub as Gulzar.
