= Junjie =

Junjie may refer to:

- Gu Junjie (born 1985), Chinese triple jumper
- JJ Lin (Lin Junjie, born 1981), a Singaporean singer-songwriter and actor based in Taiwan
- Qin Junjie (born 1991), Chinese actor
- Brilliance BS4, a car, also known as Zhonghua Junjie
- Junjie Xu, the model for Po from Kung Fu Panda: Legends of Awesomeness
- Junjie, a supporting character from the Canadian animated series Slugterra.

== See also ==
- Junji
