= The End of the World and the Cat's Disappearance =

- Poster
- 世界の終わりのいずこねこ
- Directed by: Michihiro Takeuchi
- Based on: Sekai no Owari no Izukoneko by Daisuke Nishijima
- Release date: March 7, 2015
- Running time: 88 minutes
- Country: Japan
- Language: Japanese

The End of the World and the Cat's Disappearance (世界の終わりのいずこねこ, Sekai no owari no Izukoneko) is a 2015 Japanese apocalyptic science fiction film directed by Michihiro Takeuchi and based on the manga by Daisuke Nishijima. It was released in Japan on March 7, 2015.

== Cast ==
- Izukoneko as Itsuko
- Jun Aonami as Suko
- Daisuke Nishijima as Miike-sensei
- Momoko Midorikawa as Rainy
- Ako Nagai as Irony

== Reception ==
On Twitch Film, Patryk Czekaj said that "despite various technical and budgetary limitations [the film] turns out to be a truly entertaining and enjoyable experience, as well as a perfect morning viewing."
