= List of Bokurano episodes =

Episodes of Japanese anime television series

The Japanese anime television series Bokurano was based on the manga Bokurano: Ours by Mohiro Kitoh, about a group of middle-school students who unwillingly assume the task of piloting a giant mecha named Zearth in a series of battles against mechas from parallel worlds, where the survival of Earth is dependent on their continuing to win at the cost of the life of the pilot of each battle. The anime was directed by Hiroyuki Morita and produced by Gonzo, the series premiered on April 8, 2007, on Japan's Tokyo MX, Sun TV, and other stations. Episodes were released in Japan on eight DVDs between July 25, 2007, and March 26, 2008.

== Episodes ==
No.	Title	Original release date
1	"Game"; Transliteration: "Gēmu" (Japanese: ゲーム)	8 April 2007
Fifteen children at a summer school program encounter the mysterious Kokopelli and agree to be testers for a game he claims to have completed recently. Soon, they are summoned into the cockpit of a giant robot, with Kokopelli piloting. Thus the first round takes place.
2	"Zearth"; Transliteration: "Jiāsu" (Japanese: ジアース)	15 April 2007
The children start having second thoughts about the game, but a floating being known as Koyemshi appears and teleports them to the cockpit of the robot, which the group later dubs Zearth. On the evening of the same day, a new enemy appears, and Waku is chosen to fight it.
3	"Secret"; Transliteration: "Himitsu" (Japanese: 秘密)	22 April 2007
Komo reveals the truth to her father, and while Waku's funeral is being held, Kodama is selected to be the third pilot.
4	"Strength"; Transliteration: "Tsuyosa" (Japanese: 強さ)	29 April 2007
Kodama fights the third enemy without caring about his surroundings, causing many casualties in the process, until he discovers the meaning of losing someone important to him.
5	"Weakness"; Transliteration: "Yowasa" (Japanese: 弱さ)	6 May 2007
After the children discover the fate that awaits them, they are assembled and interrogated by the military, except for Kako, who coincidentally is the next chosen pilot.
6	"Lust"; Transliteration: "Jōyoku" (Japanese: 情欲)	13 May 2007
The children try to find Kako without success, until Chizu discovers where he is hiding and tries to cheer him up. However, Kako has other plans for her.
7	"Scars"; Transliteration: "Kizu" (Japanese: 傷)	20 May 2007
The story of Chizu's relationship with her teacher is revealed, before she is selected to replace the deceased Kako.
8	"Vengeance"; Transliteration: "Fukushū" (Japanese: 復讐)	27 May 2007
The fourth battle begins, but Chizu is more worried about taking revenge on her teacher than facing her enemy.
9	"Family"; Transliteration: "Kazoku" (Japanese: 家族)	5 June 2007
Selected to fight the fifth enemy, Daichi's final wish is to spend his remaining time happily with his siblings, but his plans are ruined when the battle starts sooner than he expected.
10	"Friends"; Transliteration: "Nakama" (Japanese: 仲間)	12 June 2007
Bullied by her classmates because of her mother's past as a prostitute, Nakama, after being chosen to engage into the sixth round, resorts to extremes to arrange enough money to complete a personal project of hers in time.
11	"Life"; Transliteration: "Inochi" (Japanese: 命)	19 June 2007
Nagi, a childhood friend of Moji's needs a heart transplant, but so far the only compatible donor found is Moji himself. While dealing with Nagi's drama, he is selected to fight the seventh enemy.
12	"Related by Blood"; Transliteration: "Chi no Tsunagari" (Japanese: 血のつながり)	26 June 2007
Maki is in awe as her foster mother is about to have a baby. She hopes to at least witness her brother's birth, but when she is appointed the pilot for the eighth round, she is left with little hope to be able to do so.
13	"Earth"; Transliteration: "Chikyū" (Japanese: 地球)	3 July 2007
During Maki's fight, the children discover the true nature of the enemies they are battling, and what really is at stake on every single bout.
14	"Hesitation"; Transliteration: "Mayoi" (Japanese: 迷い)	10 July 2007
Kirie wonders if he will find the resolve to fight in the next battle. While Tanaka starts to look for means to protect the remaining children, Seki discovers her secret.
15	"Self-Destruction"; Transliteration: "Jimetsu" (Japanese: 自滅)	17 July 2007
The ninth round begins, but after witnessing his mother's miserable life, Kirie refuses to fight. Just when his companions are about to lose hope, something that nobody expected happens.
--	"Recollection"; Transliteration: "Tsuisō" (Japanese: 追想)	24 July 2007
A summary of the events so far.
16	"True Identity"; Transliteration: "Shōtai" (Japanese: 正体)	31 July 2007
Given another chance, Kirie finally decides to face the enemy, but when he surprisingly unveils Machi's identity, a commotion is created among the rest of the group.
17	"Affection"; Transliteration: "Jōai" (Japanese: 情愛)	7 August 2007
Chosen for the tenth round, Anko's life is turned upside down when a scandal involving her father brings up turmoil to her household. But she ends up finding in Kanji the strength to carry on with her duty.
18	"Reality"; Transliteration: "Genjitsu" (Japanese: 現実)	14 August 2007
After Komo is selected for the eleventh match, her father resigns from his position as a politician, but not before revealing the truth about Zearth and the children to the world.
19	"Mother"; Transliteration: "Haha" (Japanese: 母)	21 August 2007
Tamotsu reveals to Ushiro who his real parents were and tells him their story.
20	"Fate"; Transliteration: "Shukumei" (Japanese: 宿命)	28 August 2007
Machi reveals to the remaining pilots all she knows about the battles, and how she and her brother got themselves involved on them.
21	"Truth"; Transliteration: "Shinsō" (Japanese: 真相)	4 September 2007
While Kanji fights the twelfth enemy, the real objective of the masterminds is revealed. Later, Ushiro receives a proposal from Koyemshi that may save his life if he accepts.
22	"Distance"; Transliteration: "Michinori" (Japanese: 道程)	11 September 2007
Ushiro takes Kana to her father's house, having Machi traveling with them. On the way, he reminisces about his infancy days, and later, he asks Machi's help to protect Kana from Koyemshi's intentions.
23	"Snowscape"; Transliteration: "Yukigeshiki" (Japanese: 雪景色)	18 September 2007
The human armies decide to intervene during the thirteenth battle, while Machi betrays Koyemshi and becomes the next pilot in Kana's place.
24	"Story"; Transliteration: "Monogatari" (Japanese: 物語)	25 September 2007
Ushiro declines Seki's offer and becomes the pilot for the final round. During the long battle, he reminisces about his fallen comrades while struggling to save the Earth once and for all.

== See also ==
- List of Bokurano chapters
- List of Bokurano characters
