= List of Bokurano: Ours chapters =

The first volume of the original Japanese release of Bokurano: Ours, published by Shogakukan on June 30, 2004.

The manga series Bokurano: Ours is written and illustrated by Mohiro Kitoh. The first chapter premiered in the January 2004 issue of the seinen manga magazine Monthly Ikki, where it was serialized until its conclusion in the August 2009 issue. Its chapters were collected in eleven tankōbon volumes published by Shogakukan. It is about a group of middle-school students who unwillingly assume the task of piloting a giant mecha named Zearth in a series of battles against mechas from parallel worlds, where the survival of Earth is dependent on their continuing to win at the cost of the life of the pilot of each battle.

The manga is licensed for an English-language release by Viz Media, which began serializing it in the online English version of Ikki on July 23, 2009; the first print volume was scheduled to be published in February 2010. It is also licensed in French by Asuka, in Italian by Kappa Edizioni, in South Korea by Daiwon C.I., and in Taiwan by Ever Glory Publishing.

== Volume list ==
No.	Original release date	Original ISBN	North American release date	North American ISBN
1	June 30, 2004	978-4-09-188502-9	February 16, 2010	978-1421533612
1. "Kokopelli ①" (「ココペリ」①, "Kokoperi" (Ichi)); 2. "Kokopelli ②" (「ココペリ」②, "Kokoperi" (Ni)); 3. "Kokopelli ③" (「ココペリ」③, "Kokoperi" (San)); 4. "Takashi Waku ①" (「和久隆」①, "Waku Takashi" (Ichi)); 5. "Takashi Waku ②" (「和久隆」②, "Waku Takashi" (Ni)); 6. "Masaru Kodaka ①" (「小高勝」①, "Kodaka Masaru" (Ichi))
2	December 24, 2004	978-4-09-188503-6	September 21, 2010	978-1421533896
7. "Masaru Kodaka ②" (「小高勝」②, "Kodaka Masaru" (Ni)); 8. "Daiichi Yamura ①" (「矢村大一」①, "Yamura Daiichi" (Ichi)); 9. "Daiichi Yamura ②" (「矢村大一」②, "Yamura Daiichi" (Ni)); 10. "Mako Nakarai ①" (「半井摩子」①, "Nakarai Mako" (Ichi)); 11. "Mako Nakarai ②" (「半井摩子」②, "Nakarai Mako" (Ni)); 12. "Mako Nakarai ③" (「半井摩子」③, "Nakarai Mako" (San))
3	June 30, 2005	978-4-09-188504-3	February 15, 2011	978-1421533902
13. "Isao Kako ①" (「加古功」①, "Kako Isao" (Ichi)); 14. "Isao Kako ②" (「加古功」②, "Kako Isao" (Ni)); 15. "Isao Kako ③" (「加古功」③, "Kako Isao" (San)); 16. "Isao Kako ④" (「加古功」④, "Kako Isao" (Yon)); 17. "Chizuru Honda ①" (「本田千鶴」①, "Honda Chizuru" (Ichi)); 18. "Chizuru Honda ②" (「本田千鶴」②, "Honda Chizuru" (Ni))
4	December 26, 2005	978-4-09-188306-3	August 9, 2011	978-1421533919
19. "Chizuru Honda ③" (「本田千鶴」③, "Honda Chizuru" (San)); 20. "Chizuru Honda ④" (「本田千鶴」④, "Honda Chizuru" (Yon)); 21. "Kunihiko Moji ①" (「門司邦彦」①, "Moji Kunihiko" (Ichi)); 22. "Kunihiko Moji ②" (「門司邦彦」②, "Moji Kunihiko" (Ni)); 23. "Kunihiko Moji ③" (「門司邦彦」③, "Moji Kunihiko" (San)); "Bokurano Bonus" (ぼくらのおまけ, Bokura no Omake)
5	June 30, 2006	978-4-09-188323-0	January 17, 2012	978-1421533926
24. "Kunihiko Moji ④" (「門司邦彦」④, "Moji Kunihiko" (Yon)); 25. "Maki Ano ①" (「阿野万記」①, "Ano Maki" (Ichi)); 26. "Maki Ano ②" (「阿野万記」②, "Ano Maki" (Ni)); 27. "Maki Ano ③" (「阿野万記」③, "Ano Maki" (San)); 28. "Maki Ano ④" (「阿野万記」④, "Ano Maki" (Yon)); 29. "Yosuke Kirie ①" (「切江洋介」①, "Kirie Yōsuke" (Ichi))
6	December 26, 2006	978-4-09-188349-0	June 19, 2012	978-1421533933
30. "Yosuke Kirie ②" (「切江洋介」②, "Kirie Yōsuke" (Ni)); 31. "Yosuke Kirie ③" (「切江洋介」③, "Kirie Yōsuke" (San)); 32. "Yosuke Kirie ④" (「切江洋介」④, "Kirie Yōsuke" (Yon)); 33. "Takami Komoda ①" (「古茂田孝美」①, "Komoda Takami" (Ichi)); 34. "Takami Komoda ②" (「古茂田孝美」②, "Komoda Takami" (Ni)); 35. "Takami Komoda ③" (「古茂田孝美」③, "Komoda Takami" (San)); "Bokurano Backstage Revealed" (ぼくらの楽屋ご開帳, Bokura no Gakuya Go Kaichō)
7	July 30, 2007	978-4-09-188372-8	November 20, 2012	978-1421533940
36. "Takami Komoda ④" (「古茂田孝美」④, "Komoda Takami" (Yon)); 37. "Takami Komoda ⑤" (「古茂田孝美」⑤, "Komoda Takami" (Go)); 38. "Aiko Tokosumi ①" (「往住愛子」①, "Tokosumi Aiko" (Ichi)); 39. "Aiko Tokosumi ②" (「往住愛子」②, "Tokosumi Aiko" (Ni)); 40. "Aiko Tokosumi ③" (「往住愛子」③, "Tokosumi Aiko" (San)); 41. "Aiko Tokosumi ④" (「往住愛子」④, "Tokosumi Aiko" (Yon))
8	January 30, 2008	978-4-09-188389-6	April 16, 2013	978-1421533957
42. "Aiko Tokosumi ⑤" (「往住愛子」⑤, "Tokosumi Aiko" (Go)); 43. "Kanji Yoshikawa ①" (「吉川寛治」①, "Yoshikawa Kanji" (Ichi)); 44. "Kanji Yoshikawa ②" (「吉川寛治」②, "Yoshikawa Kanji" (Ni)); 45. "Kanji Yoshikawa ③" (「吉川寛治」③, "Yoshikawa Kanji" (San)); 46. "Kanji Yoshikawa ④" (「吉川寛治」④, "Yoshikawa Kanji" (Yon)); 47. "Kanji Yoshikawa ⑤" (「吉川寛治」⑤, "Yoshikawa Kanji" (Go))
9	September 30, 2008	978-4-09-188425-1	September 17, 2013	978-1421533964
48. "Kana Ushiro ①" (「宇白可奈」①, "Ushiro Kana" (Ichi)); 49. "Kana Ushiro ②" (「宇白可奈」②, "Ushiro Kana" (Ni)); 50. "Kana Ushiro ③" (「宇白可奈」③, "Ushiro Kana" (San)); 51. "Kana Ushiro ④" (「宇白可奈」④, "Ushiro Kana" (Yon)); 52. "Kana Ushiro ⑤" (「宇白可奈」⑤, "Ushiro Kana" (Go)); 53. "Jun Ushiro ①" (「宇白順」①, "Ushiro Jun" (Ichi)); "Bokurano Backstage Revealed" (ぼくらのおまけ, Bokura no Omake)
10	January 30, 2009	978-4-09-188435-0	February 18, 2014	978-1421535401
54. "Yoko Machi ①" (「町洋子」①, "Machi Yōko" (Ichi)); 55. "Yoko Machi ②" (「町洋子」②, "Machi Yōko" (Ni)); 56. "Yoko Machi ③" (「町洋子」③, "Machi Yōko" (San)); 57. "Yoko Machi ④" (「町洋子」④, "Machi Yōko" (Yon)); 58. "Yoko Machi ⑤" (「町洋子」⑤, "Machi Yōko" (Go)); 59. "Yoko Machi ⑥" (「町洋子」⑥, "Machi Yōko" (Roku))
11	December 26, 2009	978-4-09-188490-9; 978-4-09-159067-1 (limited edition)	September 16, 2014	978-1421565323
60. "Jun Ushiro ②" (「宇白順」②, "Ushiro Jun" (Ni)); 61. "Jun Ushiro ③" (「宇白順」③, "Ushiro Jun" (San)); 62. "Jun Ushiro ④" (「宇白順」④, "Ushiro Jun" (Yon)); 63. "Jun Ushiro ⑤" (「宇白順」⑤, "Ushiro Jun" (Go)); 64. "Jun Ushiro ⑥" (「宇白順」⑥, "Ushiro Jun" (Roku)); 65. "Koyemshi ①" (「コエムシ」①, "Koemushi" (Ichi)); "Bokurano Backstage Revealed" (ぼくらの楽屋ご開帳, Bokura no Gakuya Go Kaichō)

== See also ==
- List of Bokurano characters
- List of Bokurano episodes
