= Wonderful World End =

- Film poster
- ワンダフルワールドエンド
- Directed by: Daigo Matsui
- Written by: Daigo Matsui
- Produced by: Manabu Katahira; Takeshi Hayashi
- Cinematography: Hiroki Shioya
- Edited by: Daigo Matsui
- Music by: Seiko Omori; Masahiro Naoe
- Production company: Connects
- Release dates: October 23, 2014 (Shibukaru Festival); January 17, 2015 (Japan)
- Running time: 82 minutes
- Country: Japan
- Language: Japanese

Wonderful World End (Japanese: ワンダフルワールドエンド) is a 2014 Japanese youth music drama film directed by Daigo Matsui. It was released on January 17, 2015.

== Cast ==
- Ai Hashimoto as Shiori Hayano
- Jun Aonami as Ayumi Kinoshita
- Yu Inaba as Kohei Kawajima
- Go Riju as Takumi Tsukiyama
- Marie Machida as Sachiko Kinoshita
- Seiko Oomori
- Haruki Koketsu
- Masahiro Naoe

== Reception ==
Derek Elley of Film Business Asia gave the film a 6 out of 10 and said it "feels too long for its superficial subject matter; but taken in the right spirit it's a pleasant enough time-waster".

== See also ==
- List of lesbian, gay, bisexual or transgender-related films of 2015
