= Junji Tanigawa =

Japanese artist and designer

Junji Tanigawa 谷川じゅんじ (born 17 July 1965, Chiba prefecture, Japan) is a Japanese artist, product and spatial designer and the CEO at JTQ Inc.

== Career ==
Tanigawa was the designer of the Japan Media Arts Festival from 2005 to 2008.

Tanigawa was the designer of Japan House Los Angeles, an initiative of the Japanese Ministry of Foreign Affairs.

== Publications ==
- 2012 Junji Tanigawa, The Space Composer Page One Publishing（Singapore）

== Awards ==
- 2013 D&AD Award
- Display Design Awards (2002 - 2011)
- Display Industry Awards (2008, 2011)
