= Junko Yoshioka =

- Born: Japan
- Occupation: Fashion designer
- Awards: 1st place Millennium Designer Invitational; 1st prize Tokyo's Creative Competition for Fashion Designer

Junko Yoshioka is a New York City based fashion designer known primarily for her bridal wear. She has been the recipient of various awards and other recognitions, including first place (bridal) at the Millennium Designer Invitational (Tokyo 2000), and was named as one of the Top 100 Influential Japanese People in the World by Japanese Newsweek (2007).

Born in Japan, Junko Yoshioka began her career in Tokyo studying in the Japanese design school, Mode Gakuen, and apprenticing for an Italian designer. While still a student, a wedding gown design of hers won first prize out of some 10,000 entrants in Tokyo's Creative Competition for Fashion Design. She then spent several years refining her craft in Milan, earning her master's degree at the Marangoni Institute, and designing for MaxMara, Atsuro Tayama and Ante Prima.

In 2002, Yoshioka moved to New York City and launched the Bonaparte-NY line of bridal gowns. Her styles have been featured in the pages of InStyle, WWD, New York magazine, and the leading bridal publications.

Her signature design style encompasses sweeping silhouettes, asymmetrical cuts and unique hand-crafted details, often creating extra texture and dimension by juxtaposing silks with less traditional materials such as leather and wool.
