= Junji Yamauchi =

Junji Yamauchi from the Hosei University, Koganei, Tokyo, Japan was named Fellow of the Institute of Electrical and Electronics Engineers (IEEE) in 2012 for contributions to electromagnetic waveguides and design of surface wave antennas.
