= Junko Mori (composer) =

Japanese composer and music educator (born 1948)

- Born: 13 February 1948 (age 78); Japan Niigata Prefecture
- Other name: 森 (矢内) 潤子
- Occupation: composer
- Era: Contemporary

Junko (Yanai) Mori (森 (矢内) 潤子, born 13 February 1948) is a Japanese composer and music educator.

== Biography ==
Junko Mori was born in Niigata Prefecture, Japan, and attended the Tokyo National University of Fine Arts and Music, graduating with a Bachelor of Arts in music in 1971. She continued her studies in composition with Tomojiro Ikenouchi, Akio Yashiro, and Teizo Matsumura, and graduated with a Master of Music degree in composition in 1975, and a Master of Music in and musicology and solfeggio in 1978. After completing her studies, she worked as a music teacher and composer.

== Selected works ==
Stage

- Kyakyukyokekyongu torimono-chō (キャキュキョケキョングとりもの帖), Chamber Opera (1997)
- Keraseki-kin dai-kansō (ケラ咳菌大感染), Chamber Opera in 2 acts (1997)
- Kitakaze no wasureta hankachi (北風のわすれたハンカチ), Opera in 1 act, 2 scenes (1998)
- Nijihige-kō to nanairo no tsuma (虹ひげ公と七色の妻), Opera in 1 act, 18 scenes (1998)
- Kazura-sō no kidan (かずら荘綺譚 The Strange Tale of Kazura House), Mono-Opera (2001)
- Tori ni sarawareta musume (鳥にさらわれた娘) (2003); libretto by Rubie Usagi (宇佐木るび枝) after the story by Naoko Awa (安房直子)
- Akisu ni go-yōshin (空巣にご用心), Opera (2003); libretto by Rubie Usagi (宇佐木るび枝)
- Mia wa izuko e (ミアはいずこへ), Opera (2003)
- The Mystery of Kazura House (かずら荘の謎 Kazura-sō no nazo), Opera (2004)
- Tabidachi no asa (旅立ちの朝), Chamber Opera in 1 act (2005)
- A Dream Come True (夢が叶ったお話 Yume ga kanatta o-hanashi), Duo-Opera (2008)
- Kashi no ki yashiki no nazo (樫の木屋敷の謎), Duo-Opera (2009)
- Byōki ga naoru shinryōjo (病気が治る診療所), Chamber Opera in 1 act (2011)
- Shōga-dōri wa ō-nigiwai (しょうが通りは大にぎわい), Chamber Opera in 1 act (2012)

Chamber music

- String Quartet No. 3 (1975)
- Autumn Mist for flute or shakuhachi and guitar (1984)
- Imagery for piano (1987)
- Nightfall, Concertino for flute and guitar (1985)
- Twelve Children (12人のこども), Short Pieces for piano (1989)

Vocal

- Songs (テノールの為の歌曲) for tenor and piano (2007)

Mori's music has been recorded and issued on media, including:

- Windows: Selected Piano Works by Contemporary Japanese Composers Label: Jasrac, ASIN: B000MP8IXE
- Masayuki Koga/Douglas Hensley - Autumn Mist (1986) Cassette: Fortuna Records
