= Junko Maru =

Japanese actress (born 1976)

- 丸 純子
- Born: 24 January 1976 (age 50); Chiba Prefecture, Japan
- Occupation: Actress
- Years active: Late 1990s–
- Height: 153 cm (5 ft 0 in)

Junko Maru (丸 純子, Maru Junko; born 24 January 1976, in Chiba Prefecture) is a Japanese actress. She is represented with Office Some One Self.

== Biography ==
Maru graduated from the Tokyo Actors Studio. In the late 1990s, she was a reporter that appeared in news programmes etc. Maru rolled out to become an actress with the hair nude photo collection that was announced in 2001, he has appeared numerously to direct-to-videos and films after that and she has been playing leading acts.

== Filmography ==
=== Films ===
Date	Title	Producer	Distributor	Rating	Director	Notes	Ref.
2001	Sei Hanzai Jiken-bo: Double Face				Etsuo Komatsu	Lead role	
2005	Nureta Akai Ito			R15	Rokurō Mochizuki		
Oct 2010	Rōjin no Koi: Shi no Rikishi	Tokyo Theatres Company	Legend Pictures	R15	Hitoshi Ishikawa		
Jun 2012	Second Virgin no Onna: Tōri Ame	Cinema Rosa	Cinema Creation, Legend Pictures	R15	Yusuke Narita	Lead role	
Jun 2014	Ai-biki	Shinjuku K's Cinema	Legend Pictures	R15	Yukinari Hanawa	Lead role	
Jan 2016	Wakareta Nyōbō no Koibito	Shinjuku K's Cinema	Legend Pictures	R15	Satoshi Kaneda	Lead role	
Feb 2016	Yūwaku wa Arashi no Yoru ni	Shinjuku K's Cinema	Legend Pictures	R15	Shinji Imaoka		
Feb 2016	Otona no Renai Jijō	Shinjuku K's Cinema	Legend Pictures	R15	Kei Morikawa	Lead role	

=== Direct-to-video ===
Year	Title	Director	Publisher	Ref.
2001	The Scoop: Nerau Onna			
2001	Bōryoku Shōbai: Kinyū Garō-den 2			
2001	Bōryoku Shōbai: Kinyū Garō-den			
2002	Onna Inyōshi: Sei-hi Fūin			
2003	Hitodzuma Hiza makura: Kinji rareta Futari no Jikan	Kazuto Kubodera		
2003	Ochite yuku Hitozuma: Haitoku no Hate ni...	Hidekazu Takahara		
2003	Chiba Hifumi no: Shinrei Ankoku Report: Rekishi no Yami o Kiru: Shirō Amakusa no Onnen			
2004	Kūga no Shiro: Joshū 1316			
2004	Sexy Cats: Kaitō Cosplay Sanshimai			
2004	Kindan no Kajitsu: Ane no Toiki	Yuji Tajiri		
2004	Shin Kōkō Kyōshi: Kinji rareta Kankei			
2005	Midara ni Oboreru Hitozuma: Toshishita no Otoko to...	Fujiro Mitsuishi		
2005	Wakazuma Kateikyōshi: Hikisaka reta Yawahada	Shuji Kataoka		
2006	Hitozuma Dōsōkai: Sukidatta Hito ni Deattara...	Toshiro Enomoto		
2007	Irokoi: Nureru Onna	Shuji Kataoka		
2008	Hajirai: Dakitai hodo Kawaii Hitozuma	Toshiro Enomoto		
2009	Unmei no Hito	Shuji Kataoka		
2010	Akogare no Hito: Toshishita Otoko to Jōji ni Oboreta Hibi	Yuji Tajiri		
2010	Kimi no koto dake o Omou: Aiyoku no Umi ni Oborete...	Yuji Tajiri		
2010	Hajimete no Uwaki: Hitozuma no Yūwaku	Daisuke Goto		
2011	Kindan no Kajitsu DX: Daite mitai Onna-tachi		Legend Pictures	
2011	Uwakina Hitozuma-tachi Special		Legend Pictures	
2016	Hitodzuma Kateikyōshi: Hito Natsu no Keiken		Legend Pictures	

=== Advertisements ===
Title	Ref.
Kokusai Design College	
ASCII Digital Camera

=== VP ===
Title	Ref.
Sekisui Plastics Industry	

== Bibliography ==
=== Photo albums ===
Date	Title	Publisher	Photographer	Code	Ref.
May 2001	Maru Jun: Tabidachi	Bauhaus	Seisaku Nakamura	ISBN 978-4894616363	

=== Gravure ===
Title	Issue	Article	Photographer	Notes
Shūkan Friday	14 Apr 2001	News Plus 1 Bijin Reporter ga Sarashita "Hair Ratai"	Seisaku Nakamura	
Shūkan Gendai	13 Jul 2002	"Scoop Nude: Junko Maru: TV Reporter mo Kanjiru 'ndesu..."	Yuji Matsumoto	
The Best Magazine Original	Oct 2002	"News Plus * no Chisei-ha Reporter ga Nude ni natta!"	Yuji Matsumoto	
Dondon	Oct 2002	Gensō no Tobira	Yuji Matsumoto	
Shūkan Friday	15 Oct 2010	Junko Maru "Jiken na Kanjuku Rashin"		From the film Rōjin no Koi: Shi no Rikishi
Shūkan Friday	25 Feb 2011	Junko Maru "Kiseki no Rashin"	Koki Nishida	
Friday Dynamite	27 Apr 2011, Extra No.	Junko Maru "Bijuku Nude"	Koki Nishida	
Shūkan Friday	22 Jun 2012	Junko Maru "Torokeru Kanjuku Nude"		From the film Second Virgin no Onna: Tōri Ame
Shūkan Friday	20 Jun 2014	Junko Maru: Tsuini Kanjuku Nude!!		From the film Ai-biki
Shūkan Friday	8 Aug 2014	Junko Maru: Karende Utsukushi sugiru Hair Nude	Takao Karaki	
Shūkan Friday	12 Sep 2014	Junko Maru "Iyashi no Hair Nude"	Takao Karaki	
