= Jun Aonami =

Japanese actress (born 2001)

- 蒼波 純
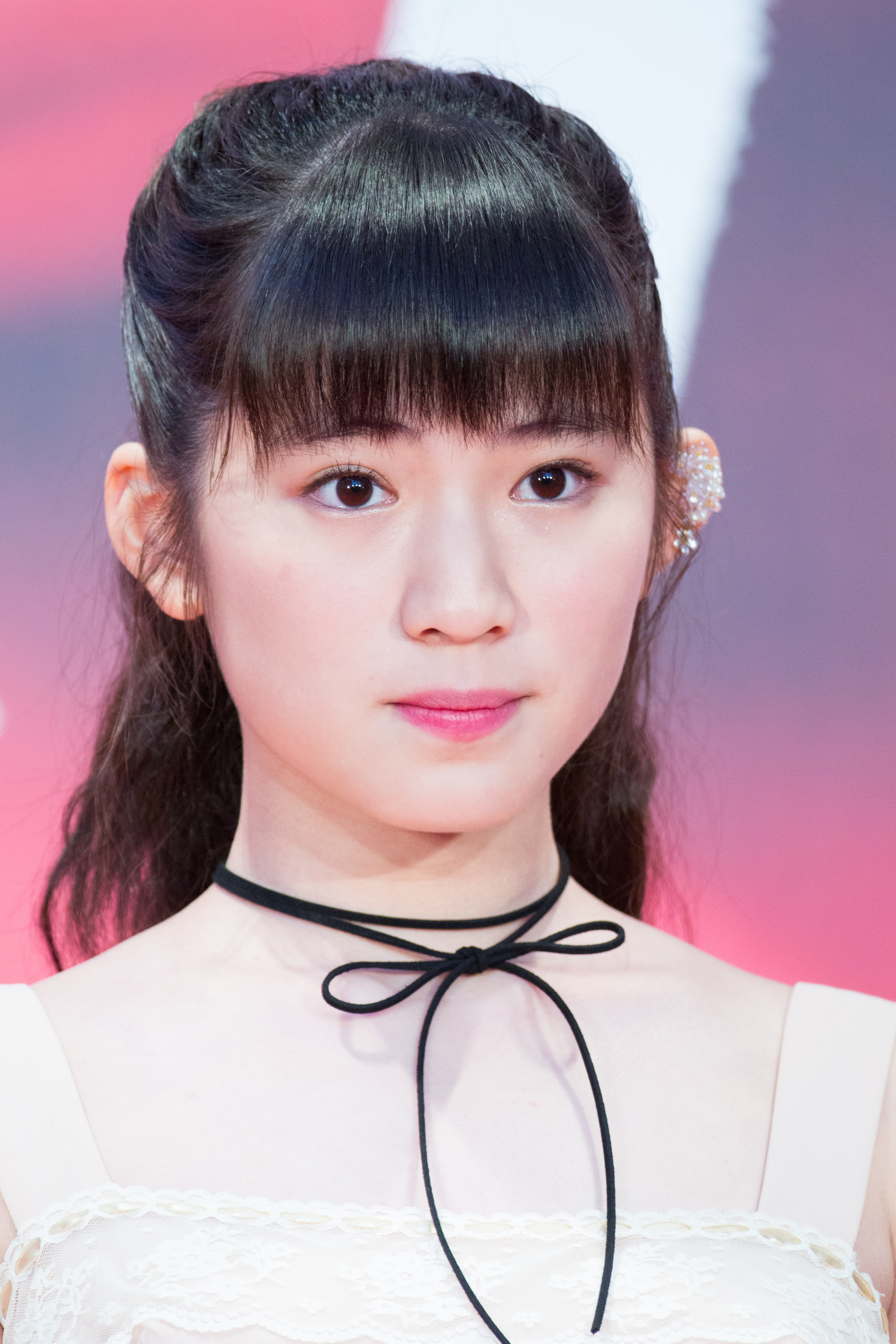
- Aonami at the 30th Tokyo International Film Festival in 2017
- Born: Jun Aonuma; June 27, 2001 (age 24); Ishinomaki, Miyagi Japan
- Occupations: Actress; model; singer
- Years active: 2013–present
- Agent: Pony Canyon
- Height: 160 cm (5 ft 3 in)

Jun Aonami (蒼波 純, Aonami Jun; born June 27, 2001 in Ishinomaki) is a Japanese Actress, model, and singer.

== Early life and career ==
Aonami born on 27 June 2001 in Ishinomaki. Since childhood she has had a great interest in otome games and some music games.

In December 2013, she changed her name with different kanji and joined Top Coat to raise her career in the entertainment industry. Her mom, who was a big fan of Go Yoshida, decided to enter Aonami into the Miss iD 2014 contest, where Yoshida happened to be one of the judges and won the grand prize for Miss iD 2014.

Since December 2013, she appeared in Seiko Oomori some music videos where her collaboration with Ai Hashimoto gained attention. She made her film debut alongside Ai as co-leads in the movie adaptation of the music video, Wonderful World End, and released in early 2015. After that, she appeared in other films like Samurai Life. She also made her stage debut in the play, Fanfare Circus.

In 2015, she formed a temporary idol unit called Zunne from JC-WC with Rinne Yoshida, who she co-starred with in the drama and movie Girls' Incidents Mostly Happen in the Toilet. The unit was intended to be active only until Yoshida turned 14.

In 2016, she portrayed the childhood version of the main character in the drama A Love Similar to Fate. She also appeared on the cover of issue 30 and in a swimsuit gravure.

In April 2019, she announced her transfer from Top Coat to Grick. Four years later, Grick announced Aonami contract had ended, which effectively meant that she was retiring from the entertainment industry. As of September at the same year, she is employed at a regular company in Miyagi Prefecture.

== Filmography ==
=== Film ===
Year	Title	Role	Notes	Ref(s)
2015	Wonderful World End	Ami	Lead role	
2015	SamuLife	Nozomi		
2015	The End of the World and the Cat's Disappearance	Suko		
2016	Summer of the Snow Woman	Fuuka	Lead role	
2018	Sunny/32	Junko Mukai		
2018	Shino Can't Say Her Own Name	Kayo's classmate		
2019	Houkago Soda Biyori Tokubetsuban	Muuko	Lead role	
2020	Geek Beef Beat	Teacher		
2021	Sweet Bitter Candy	Kaoru		

=== Television series ===
Year	Title	Role	Notes	Ref(s)
2016	Unmei ni, Nita Koi	Sakurai Kasumi		
2021	Troubles of the Blue Vampire	Hana Takigawa	Guest role Episode 1–2	
