= Kitamura Junko =

Japanese ceramic artist (born 1956)

Kitamura Junko (born 1956) is a Japanese ceramic artist.

Examples of her work are in the Museum of Fine Arts, Houston, The Brooklyn Museum, the British Museum, the Museum of Fine Art, Boston, and the Arthur M. Sackler Gallery, Smithsonian. She has won prizes for her work from the Siga Prefecture Art Exhibition in 1983, the Kyoto Art and Crafts Exhibition in 1984 and 1985, and the World Triennial Exhibition of Small Ceramics in Zagreb, Croatia in 1997. Kitamura completed her MFA at the Kyoto City University of Art. She is married to artist Yo Akiyama and was the student of two prominent Japanese artists: Suzuki Osamu and Kondo Yutaka.

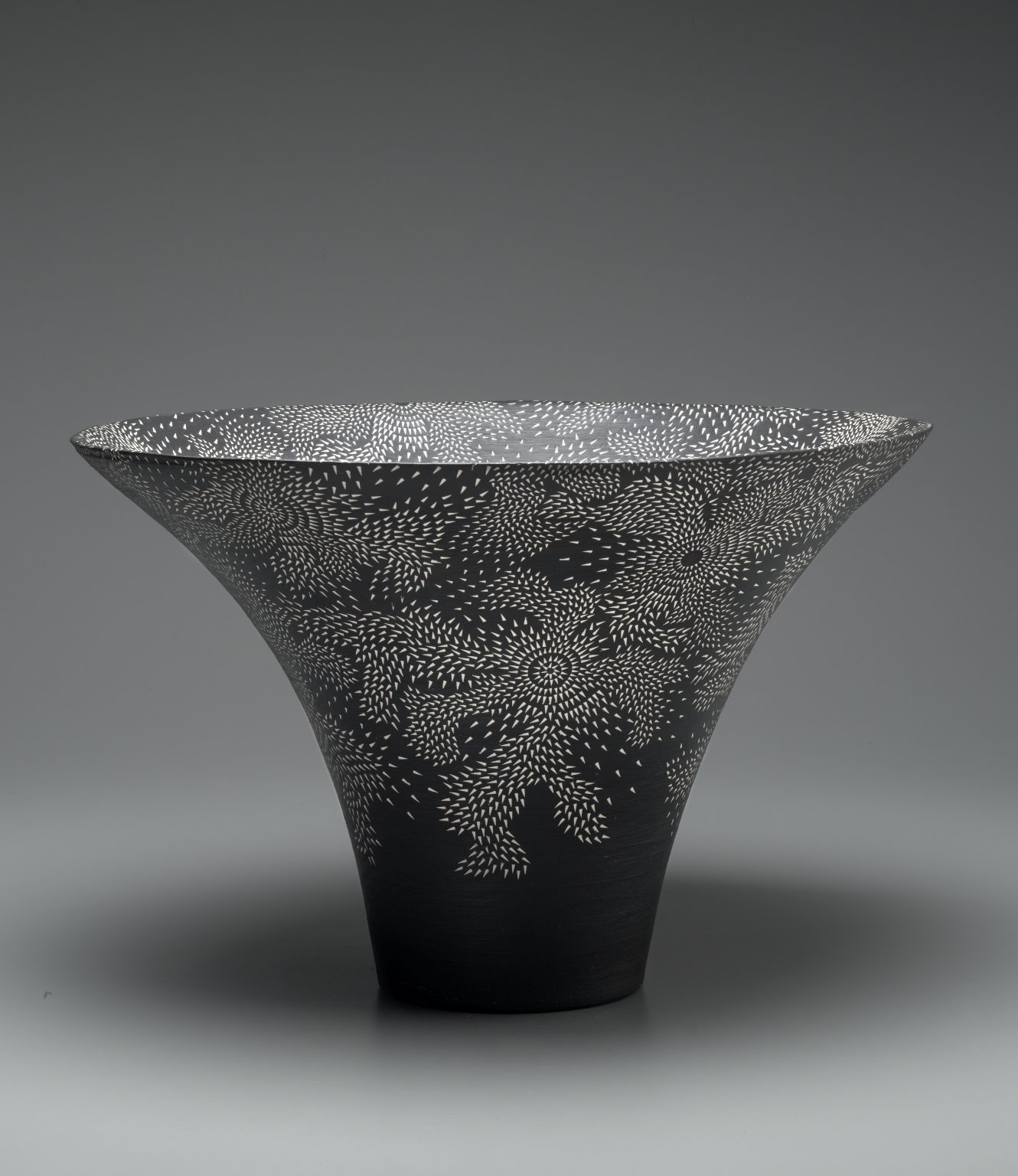
Kitamura Junko, Vase, The Brooklyn Museum

== Work and inspiration ==
Kitamura's ceramic works are made of stoneware and white slip, often decorated with intricate, dizzying patterns. The wheel-thrown pieces are sometimes adorned with white dots, which create a shifting pattern against the background, heightened by their subtle texture. Although the tiny decorations appears obsessive, Kitamura's work is inspired by the ancient 15th century Korean tradition of buncheong ware of slip-inlay. Her designs are punched into the surface by hand with bamboo, then inlaid with a white slip. Punch'ong, or otherwise known as buncheong ware could be either inlaid or stamped to create well defined patterns, or incised for a more freehand, inventive style. The buncheong tradition was interrupted by the Japanese invasions of Korea in 1592, and 1598, but was resumed in the seventeenth century by Korean and Japanese potters. Buncheong ware was adapted as a way of currency to the Korean government when metals such as bronze, silver, and gold were in short supply because of tribute sent to the Ming dynasty. It was also around this time because of the metal shortage that ceremonial vessels were recreated in a medium that was available. Kitamura's work also appears to reference or evoke pottery designs from the Jōmon period (10,500–300 BC).

== Gender in Japanese ceramics ==
Post-World War II, Japanese women began to enter the world of ceramics. While a number of female Japanese ceramic artists are prominent today, women were traditionally excluded from the apprentice system of ceramic production and not accepted as apprentices. The post-war university system allowed for an alternative teaching route, which allowed women to learn through a school rather than the apprenticeship system.

== Exhibitions ==
- Seen | Unseen: Akiyama Yo and Kitamura Junko
  - Nov 2020 to Dec 2020
- New Directions: Japanese Women Artists
  - Nov 2020 to Dec 2020
- A Moment in Time: Akiyama Yo and Kitamura Junko
  - Apr 2015 to May 2015
