= Jun Mitsuhashi =

Jun Mitsuhashi (三橋 淳, Mitsuhashi Jun; 19 April 1932 – 12 August 2024) was a Japanese entomologist, author, and a retired professor at the Tokyo University of Agriculture.

== Biography ==
Mitsuhashi graduated from the Faculty of Agriculture program at the University of Tokyo, receiving a Bachelor of Agriculture degree in 1955. In 1965, he received a Doctor of Agriculture degree at the University of Tokyo. He was a professor at the Tokyo University of Agriculture until 2012. His entomology works include scholarly articles and books. He was a recipient of the Society for In Vitro Biology's Lifetime Achievement Award in 2020.

== Publications ==
- Mitsuhashi, Jun (1997). "Insects as traditional foods in Japan". Ecology of Food and Nutrition. ISSN 0367-0244.
- Mitsuhashi, Jun (2016). Edible Insects of the World. CRC Press. ISBN 978-1-315-35088-2.
- Mitsuhashi, Jun (2019). Invertebrate Cell System Applications: Volume II. CRC Press. ISBN 978-1-351-09075-9.
