= List of Bokurano characters =

Cover Bokurano: Ours volume 1 published by Shogakukan, depicting (right to left) Takashi Waku, Aiko Tokosumi, and Masaru Kodaka, with Zearth behind.

Bokurano: Ours is a Japanese manga series written and illustrated by Mohiro Kitoh. It was serialized in Shogakukan's seinen manga magazine Monthly Ikki from 2003 to 2009. Its chapters have been collected in eleven tankōbon volumes. The series has been adapted as an anime television series called Bokurano directed by Hiroyuki Morita and produced by Gonzo that aired in 2007 and a light novel series called Bokura no: Alternative written by Renji Ōki, both with alternative storylines.

In all incarnations, the series is about a group of middle-school students who unwillingly assume the task of piloting a giant mecha named Zearth in a series of battles against mechas from parallel worlds, where the survival of Earth is dependent on their continuing to win at the cost of the life of the pilot of each battle. The following is a list of characters from the manga and anime versions, including those exclusive to the anime.

== Main characters ==
=== Kokopelli ===
Voiced by: Hiroki Tōchi

Kokopelli (ココペリ, Kokoperi) was the man who involved the children with Zearth, as well as the first pilot of the series. When the children first encountered him, he was hiding in a cave by the bay where the children were exploring. He seemed surprised to find them but persuaded the children into becoming pilots of Zearth by telling them he was looking for volunteers for a new game. Later, when the first battle takes place, he appears before the children within Zearth's cockpit, wearing a jet-black jumpsuit and sitting in a chair. From there, he teaches the children how to pilot Zearth as he destroys the first robot. During the battle, he explains that he is a human but not from their planet and that he has no concern for the lives of those who are killed in the crossfire. After the battle, he tells the children that it is now their responsibility to protect the Earth. As they are teleported out of the cockpit, Komo hears him start to whisper "I'm sorry." Kokopelli is later revealed to be a teacher from the same alternate world as Koyemshi and Machi, named Garaku (画楽) and nicknamed Gara (ガラ).

=== Takashi Waku ===
Voiced by: Daisuke Sakaguchi

Takashi Waku (和久 隆, Waku Takashi), nicknamed "Waku" (ワク), was an energetic and confident young boy. He was previously a talented soccer player and is considered popular. He wanted to become a professional player and his friends thought he had the talent for it. However, he found out that his salary-man father was a soccer player just like him in his youth and even played at the national level. The fact that someone just like him didn't make it shook Waku's resolve and he stopped playing soccer. He was chosen to become the first pilot of the children. After his battle, the children celebrated on Zearth's chest. When Ushiro patted Waku on the back, he fell off the side into the ocean. They thought that Ushiro accidentally pushed him, but he actually died a moment before, when his time as a pilot ended.

=== Masaru Kodaka ===
Voiced by: Sōichirō Hoshi

Masaru Kodaka (小高 勝, Kodaka Masaru), nicknamed "Kodama" (コダマ), is the boy chosen to pilot Zearth during the third battle. He is a relatively quiet boy who likes to keep to himself. His father is a wary individual who runs a civilian contracting company. Kodama's two gifted older brothers hate their father and try to go towards a different path, however Kodama looks up to him and his status as a "chosen" man. Being raised by his father seems to have warped Kodama's sense of ethics and morality to the point where he enjoys to take shots at stray cats with a pellet gun. During his time as a pilot, he makes no attempt to avoid casualties and marvels at the death he causes. This sense of wonder is cut short when he is sent crashing down on top of his beloved father's car, killing his father instantly. For a moment, he is left completely stunned, but manages to shake himself out of it in time to defeat his opponent. He dies unceremoniously a moment later. Kodama's death alerts the other pilots to their fate.

=== Daiichi Yamura ===
Voiced by: Tomokazu Sugita

Daiichi Yamura (矢村 大一, Yamura Daiichi), nicknamed "Daichi" (ダイチ), was a hard-working and responsible boy despite his gruff "no-nonsense" exterior. He dedicatedly took care of his three younger siblings: Futaba, Santa and Yoshi. He accepted this task because their mother had died much earlier, and their father abandoned them for unknown reasons three years ago. Their uncle on their father's side made up for his brother's disappearance by renting a home for the four siblings to live in, and paying for all expenses. Daichi earned his keep by working as a mail and newspaper boy, and for his uncle's landscaping business on his days off. He chose to live separately from his uncle with his siblings so that his father would have a place to return to if he ever decided to. During the fourth battle, Daichi refused to move until the citizens had sufficient time to escape, a practice later adopted by all future pilots. When the battle began, Daichi's will to protect his family gave him the strength to subdue his opponent long enough to carry it to the bay where no one else could get hurt. His last request to the group was for Ushiro to stop abusing Kana and take care of her, and for Koyemshi to discreetly dispose of his body so that his family would not mourn him. His story ends with his siblings going to the amusement park Daichi had protected during the battle with the tickets he had obtained for them. Following his death, his father returned.

=== Mako Nakarai ===
Voiced by: Yuka Iguchi

Mako Nakarai (半井 摩子, Nakarai Mako), nicknamed "Nakama" (ナカマ), is a girl who focuses all of her energy on living honestly and being an active benefit to the community in hopes that others would see her as a responsible and dependable person. Despite this, the well-known fact that her mother is a prostitute and her humorless, over-responsible attitude leaves her with no friends. Ever since elementary school, any kind of hatred or dishonesty tortures her, so much that she can't even raise a clenched fist at all of the kids who bully her, constantly having to keep to her duty and not protest in the slightest. Regardless, she looks up to her mother, and hopes to be able to stand proudly like she does. It was her mother's idea that she go to the nature school so that she would finally make some friends.

Ever since the first battle, Mako has secretly been making uniforms for herself and the other pilots, but when she finds out that she would be the fifth pilot she is hard pressed for time and money to complete them. She feels the quickest way to attain the necessary money is to prostitute herself and manages to convince her mother's pimp to arrange a John for her. Much to her surprise, the man she meets is an old acquaintance of her mother's who drives her home after buying her dinner. Her mother, having found out about the plan gives Nakama her needlework money that she has been saving so that she wouldn't have to resort to such drastic measures.

When the fifth battle begins, her opponent allows the populace time to evacuate which coincidentally gives Nakama the time she needs to finish the uniforms, though some are incomplete. Before returning to the cockpit, she finds out that one of the girls who bullies her is missing and uses Zearth's powers to locate her and teleport her out of harms way, after finally standing up to her. After defeating the enemy robot, she states that, if she is reincarnated, she wishes to return as a person just like her mother. Her story arc ends with the girls who bullied her finally helping clean the classroom.

=== Isao Kako ===
Voiced by: Yoshinori Fujita

Isao Kako (加古 功, Kako Isao), nicknamed "Kako" (カコ), was a troubled youth with many problems. He acted as an errand boy for a group of bullies to avoid being the subject of their abuse, and his parents would let him get away with just about anything, much to his older sister's chagrin. Kako's only "friend" was Kirie who also went to his school. Kako would constantly boss Kirie around since it made him feel less like a loser and Kirie would take this abuse without complaint. Kako in fact made Kirie accompany him to the nature school for this very reason. When he first entered the game, Kako was excited, hoping that his piloting Zearth would make him famous, but upon learning the price of piloting, he suffered a mental breakdown and hid in his room. His mental state was made even worse when Koyemshi visited him and told him that the other pilots were leaving him out of the loop and that he had so little time left. This pushed Kako overboard, and he went over to Chizu's house with every intention of raping her, but she stopped him at knifepoint. Moments later, he and the other pilots were retrieved by the army. While being held there, Kako experienced graphic nightmares involving him beating up on the bullies who would use him and raping the female one, or beating his sister and Chizu while they mocked him. While piloting Zearth, Kako hoped that the interference of the army would mean he wouldn't need to pilot and die. This hope was dashed when the futility of the army's attempts was made apparent. Kako then panicked and started running from the battle with no intention of stopping. The group was at a loss trying to find a way to get Kako to fight, but it was Kirie who finally spoke up and made a comment implying Kako's cowardice. This comment drove Kako into a rage and he began to mercilessly beat Kirie. Chizu stepped forward and stopped this display by stabbing her knife into Kako's throat and slitting his jugular.

In the TV series, Kako did not even pilot Zearth. After he was visited by Koyemshi, he tried to make a move on Chizu by inviting her to visit an aquarium together, but she refused. When he was selected as the following pilot, he panicked and disappeared. Chizu found him in the aquarium and tried to cheer him up, but when he tried to force his way on her, she pushed him and he fell from a stair, rendered unconscious. Chizu fled away from the aquarium leaving him behind, when it was destroyed by a missile fired during the battle between the military and the enemy robot, and Kako, just after recovering his senses, was killed by the debris. The children discovered what happened when his lifeless body was teleported to Zearth's cockpit with them, and Chizu claimed the responsibility for his death, before being selected to replace him.

=== Chizuru Honda ===
Voiced by: Ao Takahashi

Chizuru Honda (本田 千鶴, Honda Chizuru), nicknamed "Chizu" (チズ), was relatively calm and a bit quiet, yet particularly disgusted by the one-track minds of her male classmates. Her chair was black and fancy, carefully designed, shapely, and looked very old. While at school Chizu was in love with her teacher, but was being deceived. He lured her into a date and then blackmailed her to being gang-raped by his friends. For this reason she began to carry a knife with her at all times. During the combat she revealed she was pregnant and used Zearth's power to kill all of the men who assaulted her, resulting in many civilian deaths in the process - except the teacher Morihiro Hatagai (畑飼 守弘, Hatagai Morihiro), because her older sister, who was in love with him too, stopped her. After she finished the battle, just before she dies, she laments at how her baby was to go to her instead of being born in her sister, and asks Koyemshi to put her body and that of her baby into one of the many spots in Zearth. After her death, the rest of children figured that Chizu's baby (who died with her) was also listed in the contract, which means that one of them, besides Kana, was not bound to it.

Just like Kako's story, Chizu's scenario had a lot of changes in the TV series. She was seduced by her teacher just like in the manga, but instead of being blackmailed by him, he sold some pictures of them having sex which ended appearing on the internet. Despite having the faces digitally altered, they were identified by her classmates, which led to him being punished by the school's principal. He begged for Chizu's forgiveness, and just after she accepted his apologies, she discovered he was also dating her older sister. After Kako's death, she was chosen to assume his place.

=== Kunihiko Moji ===
Voiced by: Kōki Miyata

Kunihiko Moji (門司 邦彦, Moji Kunihiko), nicknamed "Moji" (モジ), is a boy whose great intuition helped some of the previous pilots to defeat their enemies. Moji was kind and insightful, often ready to give advice and wisdom to his comrades when they needed it. The other children often came to him for advice. He had two childhood friends: a girl named Tsubasa Hiiragi and a boy named Nagi Namoto, who had a heart disease. Upon checking, Moji found out that his heart was a perfect match for Nagi. After his victory, Moji has Koyemshi transport him to a hospital where Nagi could receive his heart. His chair was a plastic chair with a metal frame back that curved around into a semicircle, which was the same chair in the hospital's room where Nagi was being kept. Moji had wanted to give his heart to Nagi so that Nagi and Tsubasa could be together, despite his own feelings for Tsubasa. Ironically, Tsubasa was actually in love with Moji and only stayed by Nagi so that he wouldn't feel alone, which Nagi knew from the beginning, and as such urged her to go after Moji once he was better.

=== Maki Ano ===
Voiced by: Kumiko Higa

Maki Ano (阿野 万記, Ano Maki), nicknamed "Maki" (マキ), is the adopted daughter of an anime otaku, and is expecting a baby brother. Due to her father's interests, she is extremely knowledgeable about military equipment, vehicles and practices; when she was younger, she and her father used to play transforming heroes and transforming robots. She also has some experience with sewing, though by her own admission she isn't very good, and she and Komo finish the costumes that Nakama was unable to complete. Before her battle, she goes to Ushiro to tell him he has to protect Kana for the sake of his family, and the next day she goes out with Komo and gets a complete feminine makeover at a beauty salon. This leads to a lament about how she wished she had never been a girl because she was scared of reflecting the possibilities of her birth mother's behavior, but now that she would have a brother she had to leave an image of herself as a girl. Though she loves her family, she is insecure about having been adopted. When she tells her father that he shouldn't be watching anime while his first child is being born, he replies matter-of-factly that she is his first child. Her battle begins the night after her mother enters labour. During the battle, she discovers that the robots that they have been fighting are in fact piloted by humans of parallel universes, and that the battles are the method for choosing which ones survive, and which ones don't. With every victory, 10 billion people from another universe die. As she finishes her battle, she uses Zearth's powers to see the birth of her baby brother. Later, it is revealed that Maki's family was not informed of her fate and continued to look for her, until they were personally visited by Machi and Ushiro.

=== Yōsuke Kirie ===
Voiced by: Shintarō Asanuma

Yōsuke Kirie (切江 洋介, Kirie Yōsuke), nicknamed "Kirie" (キリエ), was a fat boy who was often bullied. His depressed hikikomori cousin Kazuko, who was bulimic and cut her own wrists, made him wonder about the worth of his life and that of others. Yet after Chizu's battle he stabbed, non-fatally, the teacher who had abused her, with the knife that she had given him. He discussed his views about the lack of importance of individual human lives with Tanaka, as well as about sacrifices. He wondered if he could bring himself the courage to fight and kill another human, even knowing that the entire world's fate depend on it, and asks Tanaka to kill him and replace him if he fails to it. Before his battle starts, he shows himself to the opponent robot, and its pilot, a girl, does likewise, showing him the many cuts and slits along her arm. After this moment, Kirie finally finds his resolve to fight. His chair is fancy with 3 curved wooden legs, based on the one from Kazu's makeup desk.

In the TV series, after being chosen as the next pilot, Kirie discovers his mother attempting suicide after months of unemployment and abandonment by her husband. Growing angry at the world that drove his mother to try to kill herself, he refused to fight when it was his turn. However, his opponent commits suicide in front of Zearth, ripping out and crushing its own cockpit. Despite the technical win, Kirie does not die, and in fact remains pilot for a second match. During the period between his two fights, his father returns to his mother after receiving news of her suicide attempt, and Tamotsu helps her find a job as a waitress. Seeing the world give his mother another chance at happiness, he decides to give the world another chance as well, which cements his resolve to fight in his second battle. Kirie is revealed to be a natural in piloting Zearth as he quickly and swiftly overwhelms the enemy robot. Before dying, Kirie confirms his suspicions about Machi and unveils her true identity as Koyemshi's sister.

=== Takami Komoda ===
Voiced by: Mamiko Noto

Takami Komoda (古茂田 孝美, Komoda Takami), nicknamed "Komo" (コモ), was the only daughter of a Navy official. It is through Komo that the army discovers the kids' involvement with Zearth. She was Maki's best friend since childhood. At first, Komo was rather quiet and bored by the world, preferring to read and play the piano alone, and secretly wondering if her father would have preferred a son instead. But as the time of her battle draws near, she goes outside to observe the world more closely and comes to appreciate how lively and beautiful it is. She almost loses her battle, but is saved when the enemy pilot discovers that Takami is the same age as his recently killed daughter, causing him to abandon his robot and runs away. The Japanese government sets up a plan to lure him up to a piano recital held by Komo after revealing to the world some bits of information regarding Zearth and its pilot's name. In the end, the enemy pilot attends the recital and is so moved by Komo's performance that he allows himself to be killed by her father a few minutes before the time limit.

Komo's setup is far simpler in the TV series, as she simply defeats her enemy by herself. Her father, whose position was changed to a politician, plays a more significant role in the story, as he tries to use his influence to reveal to the world the truth behind Zearth and the children, which ends up costing him not only his career, but his life as well.

=== Aiko Tokosumi ===
Voiced by: Yui Makino

Aiko Tokosumi (往住 愛子, Tokosumi Aiko), nicknamed "Anko" (アンコ), is the daughter of a newscaster who discovered her involvement with Zearth. Outgoing and energetic, though not very smart, Anko dreamed of being an idol singer. She told her father all of the truth when questioned by him, except about her ultimate fate. Anko's father and the military attempted to fabricate a story about Zearth and the children to soothe the public opinion. However, they were preempted by Karita, a boy who appeared on TV earlier falsely claiming he was a Zearth pilot and whose comments raised the public opinion's hate for Zearth, culminating in his assassination. Afterward, Anko's father received an authorization to broadcast his daughter's battle from inside the cockpit to the whole world. Even when seeing Anko in grave danger as the acid flowing from enemy's piercing needles managed to breach the cockpit, almost killing her and Machi, her father did not stop the transmission despite objections from the others. However, after sending these images to the world, messages supporting his daughter came to the station and he used them to encourage her to fight back. She managed to turn the tide of the battle by using the same needles the enemy robot pierced at Zearth's body to knock it down, and after the match was decided, her father revealed to her that he kept his cool at that moment because he was told about her inevitable death. After sending a message to the world apologizing for the casualties occurred during Zearth's battles, Anko sealed her victory by destroying the enemy cockpit, and died in her father's arms. Thanks to Anko's declaration, the army managed to create its official version of the story, claiming that Zearth's only pilots are Komo, Anko and the deceased Karita, in spite of all three now being dead.

Anko's story is much different in the TV series. Her father is a journalist who is working with Komo's father and Kanji's mother not only to find a way to save the children from the contract, but also to reveal the truth about Zearth to the whole world, despite the government's efforts to hide it. He is forced to resign after his affair with a famous model is disclosed. Thanks to Kanji, with whom she became very close, she found the strength to bear the whole scandal, fight her enemy head-on and obtain a quick victory before passing on happily in his arms.

=== Kanji Yoshikawa ===
Voiced by: Kenji Nojima

Kanji Yoshikawa (吉川 寛治, Yoshikawa Kanji), nicknamed "Kanji" (カンジ), is Ushiro's schoolmate and friend. Before his fight begins, he reveals to Ushiro that despite seeing him hurting Kana, he did not intervene because she asked him not to. He also reveals to him a secret that makes Ushiro start to change his point of view about her, and asks him to watch out for Machi. Kanji's opponent is by far one of the strangest who appeared in the manga as it first launches itself into the sky then lands in a very far away place - Hawaii to be exact, then starts to fire shots across the Pacific Ocean at Zearth, using needles it launched at the start of the battle as markers. After Japan attempts to defeat the enemy with a nuclear bomb and fails, Ushiro suggests to Kanji to use the lasers to target the enemy. Although Kanji could not directly target the enemy, a human soul could be used as a target, and Seki immediately volunteers. Koyemshi teleports Seki and 22 soldiers to where the enemy is, and Seki valiantly reaches the enemy in time for Kanji to fire, thus defeating it. After the victory, Kanji requests Koyemshi to teleport him to the top of the Chūtenrō tower where he contemplates who the next pilot will be in his final moments. Following his death, Kanji's father is prosecuted for the construction faults in Chūtenrō Tower, and he reveals to Machi and Ushiro that it will be demolished.

Kanji's role in the story is far more elaborated in the TV series. Not only he is the son of Mitsue Yoshikawa, a lead researcher with the task of unlocking the secrets behind Zearth's technology, but he also ends up emotionally involved with Anko when her family is shaken by a scandal. It was by his support that Anko managed to gain strength enough to bear with her situation and defeat her enemy, and while he sadly holds her body as she passes out, he has a vision of some mysterious people whom he believes to be the masterminds behind the whole battles they have to fight. Koyemshi once stated to Machi that he chose Kanji to be the pilot for the final battle, but he changed his mind and had him battle earlier.

=== Kana Ushiro ===
Voiced by: Kana Asumi

Kana Ushiro (宇白 可奈, Ushiro Kana), nicknamed "Kana" (カナ), is Ushiro's younger sister. When the children entered into the contract, they were told that they would be "testing a game," and Ushiro prevented Kana from joining as he didn't want her to have fun. However, it is later revealed that Kana had actually entered into the contract after Kokopelli's battle, before the children discovered the consequences of it. Despite being considered too kind to harm others even at the cost of herself, Koyemshi stated that she could stand a chance in the battle as younger the pilot, stronger is the vital energy provided to the robot, thus increasing its capabilities. She does so and dies.

In the TV series, it is revealed that Ushiro and Kana are actually second cousins (her father is Tanaka's cousin), and Koyemshi tries to make her sign the contract too after Tanaka's death, but this fails due to Ushiro and Machi's combined efforts and Koyemshi's death. She ends up being the only child to survive in the end; the last episode features her entering middle school and befriending Daiichi's siblings, whom she tells the story of the Zearth battles.

=== Yōko Machi ===
Voiced by: Yūko Sanpei

Little is known about Yōko Machi (町 洋子, Machi Yōko), nicknamed "Machi" (マチ). Her parents are fishermen and she has described her older brother as being similar to Ushiro in behavior. She was the one who discovered Kokopelli's cave, and she was reluctant to sign the contract, but Waku pushing her hand onto the sensor forced her to become a part of it. Machi feels guilty about the deaths of all of the previous pilots because she was the one who led all the children into Kokopelli's cave.

Machi is eventually revealed to be Koyemshi's younger sister, a human girl from a parallel Earth. It turns out that because Kokopelli and her home world's battle for existence was still taking place, Machi did not become a part of the contract since you cannot be part of 2 contracts at once. The usual chair she sits on actually belonged to Maki, but Machi signs the contract after Kana's victory, agreeing to fight for her adopted Earth. It turns out that Machi had a crush on Ushiro since the first time they met, confessing to him after their trip to visit all their friends' families. She is shot in the head shortly afterward by a mysterious man and ends up in a coma; Koyemshi decided to end her life himself since he thought it would have been the best choice, leaving Ushiro to take her place for the next battle. In the end, it turns out that a version of Machi already existed on this Earth, and was apparently replaced by the Machi from the parallel Earth. After the parallel Earth Machi's death, Koyemshi then returns this Earth's Machi to her family; she was in some sort of stasis and believed it was still the start of summer vacation shortly before the nature trip, which was most likely when the parallel Earth Machi replaced her.

In the TV series, tired of seeing the same story of suffering and death being repeated at each world she passes as well as disagreeing heavily with Koyemshi's callous treatment of the Ushiro siblings, Machi ends up killing Koyemshi and helping Ushiro protect his sister by becoming one of the pilots, instead of Kana, like Koyemshi had planned. After winning her fight, she reaches some snowy ruins and dies while laying on the snow in front of Koyemshi's mutilated body, wishing that things had been different.

=== Jun Ushiro ===
Voiced by: Junko Minagawa

Jun Ushiro (宇白 順, Ushiro Jun), nicknamed "Ushiro" (ウシロ), is a boy with a short fuse. Whenever he is upset by anything, the first thing he does is beat Kana, his younger sister. Ushiro's mother died giving birth to Kana, which would explain his hatred toward her. It is later revealed that Ushiro and Kana are not related, as Ushiro is actually Tanaka's son. Prior to Kanji's fight, Ushiro confides to him that he hadn't joined the contract with the others, revealing himself to be the one who is exempt from the contract. The chair he usually sits on actually belonged to Kana.

After Kana's victory, Ushiro enters into the contract along with Machi, wanting to involve himself as opposed to "outsiders". Machi is chosen for the next battle, leaving Ushiro to fight the final battle. But after Machi's premature death during their trip to visit all their friends' families, Ushiro had to take her place for the 14th battle.

In Ushiro's fight, the battle takes place on the opposing enemy's world. After a short battle, Ushiro defeats the enemy robot, but is tricked into opening the enemy cockpit which allows the pilots inside to teleport away and hide among the population of the city. Realizing with horror the enemy pilot does not have any intentions to win the battle or let herself be found, and due to the 48-hour limit rule for a winner, Ushiro has no choice but to kill everyone on the planet. After preparing himself mentally with Koyemshi, Ushiro launches the start of his genocide attack; he has a short freak out in the middle of it, throwing up on his own lap, but recovers and ultimately succeeds on his attack and destruction of the other planet, dying shortly afterwards. He is shown to have joined the group of children in a dream sequence.

In the TV series, Ushiro did enter into the contract along with the other children, and is eventually revealed to be the orphaned son of Tanaka and Ichirou, a murdered yakuza heir and a friend of Sakakibara. After Kanji's battle, Koyemshi asks him to ask Kana to sign the contract in exchange for him becoming the very last pilot, who, according to the rules, has a chance to survive the battle if winning. However, Ushiro decides not to involve Kana in the contract, and asks Machi to help him get her free. After Machi's killing of Koyemshi and subsequent victory, Ushiro demands Seki let him become the next pilot and destroy Zearth after winning, relieving both of the successor's duty, and potentially sparing other parallel universes from the same ordeal. After a long 30-hour battle, Ushiro manages to defeat his enemy and save the Earth for good, dying alone but peacefully.

=== Koyemshi ===
Voiced by: Akira Ishida

A weird creature who calls himself "Koyemshi" (コエムシ, Koemushi) and becomes the children's tutor after Kokopelli's disappearance. He is able to communicate verbally, and is usually very sarcastic. He responds to the children's call, and is able to teleport them, as well as others from the outside world to the cockpit, and vice versa. However, he cannot teleport directly between two places, and must go through the cockpit beforehand. Between battles, he can be seen conversing with an unknown party who is later revealed to be his younger sister, Machi. Like her, Koyemshi was once a human being involved in the battles for the survival of a parallel Earth. Koyemshi isn't a unique creature; there seems to be one for every Earth involved in the "game". At the end of the series, as a sort of atonement to Machi, Koyemshi returns to his human form and enters into his supporting Earth's contract in order to participate in the 15th and final battle for its existence, which also serves as the tutorial battle for the next set of pilots of the next world: in effect, becoming the next "Kokopelli".

In the TV series, Koyemshi proves to be much more cruel than in the manga, mocking and demeaning the kids openly. By the end he tries to manipulate Kana into becoming the pilot by threatening to force Ushiro into doing so if she doesn't agree; however, he ends up being shot to death by Machi, who gets tired of his machinations and works against him upon Ushiro's requests. The TV series also reveals that, back when he was a human being called Shirō Machi (町 史郎, Machi Shirō), he tried to amuse their guide in order to become the successor, thus being able to survive, but in the end, another child was chosen. He then begged for a chance to survive and the guide decided to accept his request by turning him into her replacement and giving him his current "Koyemshi" appearance.

=== Masamitsu Seki ===
Voiced by: Shinji Kawada

Masamitsu Seki (関 政光, Seki Masamitsu) is one of the officers who befriended the children and assumed one of the empty places in Zearth's group. He joined the military thanks to his fascination with Idol Defense Force Hummingbird. During Kanji's battle, Seki sacrifices himself in order for Kanji to defeat the enemy robot, creating another empty seat in the group.

In the TV series, Seki threatened Koyemshi with a gun and had his right arm cut off by him, when he teleported his whole body, except for the hand which was holding the weapon to another place. By the time he signed the contract along Tanaka, it was already replaced with a mechanical prosthesis, which hides some sensors planted by Kanji's mother in order to gain access to information regarding Zearth's technology. In the end, he becomes the only contracted pilot to survive the battles.

=== Misumi Tanaka ===
Voiced by: Naomi Shindō

Misumi Tanaka (田中 美純, Tanaka Misumi) is the other officer who befriended the children and assumed one of the empty places in Zearth's group. An intelligent and perceptive woman, she is married, with a 10-year-old daughter. Prior to her marriage, her name was Miho Satō (佐藤 美保, Satō Miho), and she is actually Ushiro's mother. She left him with Kana's father (an old teacher of hers) thirteen years ago, as she didn't feel she had the right to raise him herself. To aid Kana in her battle, and foreseeing a battle outside their home world, she convinced Koyemshi to allow an advanced fighter jet to be teleported into the cockpit, and used it to shoot down the unmanned fighters deployed by the enemy world's army to help their robot. In the end, she is shot down and, after ejecting, is captured by the enemy robot. Fearing Kana would stop fighting to not harm her, she ends up killing herself with her own gun, just after Ushiro is told that she is his real mother. After her death her daughter Miku is seen visiting the remains of the fighter jet.

In the TV series, Tanaka's husband was a yakuza heir who was murdered by retaliation of his rivals. She left Ushiro at Kana's father's care, as he is a cousin of hers in the anime. She joined the military in hopes of becoming dependable enough to raise her child by herself, until her son was selected as a Zearth pilot and she was forced to intervene. She dies before having the chance to pilot Zearth, killed while facing the assassins of Komo's father.

== Other characters ==
=== Sasami ===
Voiced by: Hiroyuki Kinoshita

A member of the Department of Defense, Sasami (佐々見) is effectively Seki and Tanaka's boss, and the coordinator of everything Zearth-related in the Government. He arranged to have the kids picked up by the military after Komo's information of their relation to Zearth, and he has played various behind-the-scenes roles in the story. He has even appeared in Zearth's cockpit a few times to check up on things. Sasami was there to witness and support Ushiro's battle and reacts in horror to Ushiro's revelation over what he must do. After the final battle, Sasami takes on the role of Koyemshi to guide the next set of people in the next world.

In an extra in the artbook released after the ending, it was shown that Sasami has finished supporting the next universe and safely made it back to his universe.

=== Tate ===
Tate (多手) is often seen accompanying Sasami, and can only be assumed to be one of his head assistants. Tate's appearances in the manga have been infrequent so far. After his initial appearance in Kako's storyline, he was seen accompanying Komo at her rehearsal, and during Kanji's 32 hour battle, he appeared in Zearth's cockpit asking the kids and Tanaka if anyone needed a bathroom break.

=== Akira Tokosumi ===
Voiced by: Tōru Furusawa

Akira Tokosumi (往住 明, Tokosumi Akira) is the journalist father of Anko.

=== Kunio Shōji ===
Kunio Shōji (庄治 邦夫, Shōji Kunio) is one of the officers who were to supervise the children. He has a number of fingers severed after threatening Koyemshi at gunpoint during their first encounter. Due to his injuries and Koyemshi's enmity towards him, he does not take a role as one of the children's caretakers. It is later revealed that his fingers have been successfully reattached.

=== Tamotsu Sakakibara ===
Voiced by: Takehiro Murozono

Tamotsu Sakakibara (榊原 保, Sakakibara Tamotsu) is a convicted yakuza who recently left prison after carrying a 10-year sentence and works for Ushiro's grandfather. He was also friends with his father to the point of feeling himself responsible for his death in part. By Tanaka's request, he assumed the task of aiding her to protect the children from harm. He also knows about Ushiro's connection with his employers, but hides the truth from him, despite sometimes accidentally calling him "botchan" ("little boss").

He appears only in the TV series.

== See also ==
- List of Bokurano: Ours chapters
- List of Bokurano episodes
