= Jun Yamaguchi =

Japanese composer

Jun Yamaguchi (山口 淳, Yamaguchi Jun) is a Japanese composer of contemporary music, pianist and musicologist.

== Biography ==
Born in Tokyo, Japan in 1967, he studied piano from age 7. He left the Senzoku-Gakuen College of Music in 1993 before graduating. He studied composition and music theory with Tatsuhiko Nishioka, Yori-Aki Matsudaira and Chaya Czernowin.

He has received several awards and prizes, including the Sixth Akiyoshidai International Composition Award (1996, II prize and the Governor's Prize of Yamaguchi Prefecture), the 13th JSCM (ISCM Japan Division) Composition Award (1996, finalist), the 20th IRINO Prize (1999, I prize), ISCM World Music Days 2001 Yokohama (2001, selection) and the 72nd Japan Music Competition (2003, finalist).

In July 2001, he came to the United States under a grant from the Asian Cultural Council and remained in New York City until June 2002.

In April 2006 he matriculated in the Graduate School of Design, Kyushu University (science of sound culture studies in acoustic design program) and studied with Shigenobu Nakamura. He received a M.A. in Design, Kyushu University in March 2008.

== Main works ==
- Incarnation No.2 for Organ (1992)
- Density of the breezing air No.1 for Flute, Clarinet, Trombone, Vibraphone and Piano (1995)
- Incarnation No.4 for Piano (1996)
- Incarnation No.5 for Trumpet player (1996)
- SACRIFICE for 2 Violins (1996)
- Density of the breezing air No.2 for Tenor Saxophone, Violin, Percussion, and Piano (1996)
- A Garden with Turning Breezes No.1 for Shō and 6 players (1997)
- String quartet No.1 (1997)
- Morphogenesis No.1 (Dance(s) No.1) for Soprano and Sampling Sound (1998)
- Dance(s) No.2 for Trombone and Contrabass (1998)
- Dance(s) No.3 foe Soprano and Strings ensemble (1998–1999)
- Interlude / the prayer and fetal movement - rest on the basis of Requiem composed by Yori-Aki Matsudaira - for Organ (1999)
- The Cause of Disposition for Visual Art and Sampling Sound (2000)
- Stillness Dance(s) for Piano (2000)
- A Garden with Turning Breezes No.1 for Sho and Violin (2000)
- Love Song for Koto and Sampling sound (2002)
- String quartet No.2 - In memory of September 11, 2001 in New York - (2003)
- Tenchi-Yuraku for Koto and Piano (2004)
