= Jun'ichi =

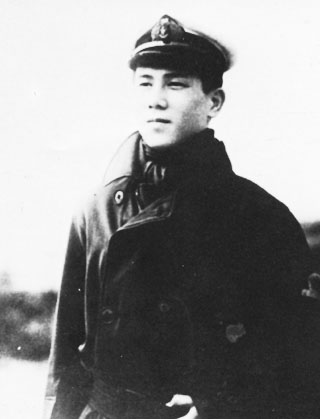
- Junichi Sasai, a naval aviator
- Gender: Male

Origin
- Origin: Japanese
- Meaning: Depending on the kanji used

Jun'ichi or Junichi is a masculine Japanese given name.

== Written forms ==
Junichi can be written using different kanji characters. "Ichi" is nearly always written with the character 一 ("one") or its daiji (large numerals) form 壱, while "jun" might be written with a variety of characters, including:

- 純, "pure"
- 淳, "honest"
- 潤, "moisture"
- 準, "standard"
- 順, "obey"
- 准, "approve"

The name can also be written in hiragana or katakana.

== People with the name ==
- Bishūyama Jun'ichi (備州山 順一; 1919–1962), Japanese sumo wrestler
- Futatsuryū Jun'ichi (双津竜 順一; 1950–2014), Japanese sumo wrestler
- Junichi Hirokami (広上 淳一; born 1958), Japanese conductor
- Junichi Ihara (伊原 純一), Japanese diplomat
- Junichi Inagaki (稲垣 潤一; born 1953), Japanese singer
- Junichi Inamoto (稲本 潤一; born 1979), Japanese footballer
- Junichi Inoue (井上 純一; born 1971), Japanese speed skater
- Junichi Ishii (石井 準一; born 1957), Japanese politician
- Junichi Kajioka (梶岡 潤一; born 1970), Japanese actor and producer
- Junichi Kakizaki (柿崎 順一; born 1971), Japanese artist, sculptor, and installation artist
- Jun'ichi Kanemaru (金丸 淳一; born 1962), Japanese voice actor
- Karigane Junichi (雁金 準一; 1879–1959), Japanese Go player
- Junichi Kato (加藤 順一; born 1935), Japanese rower
- Junichi Kato (YouTuber) (加藤 純一, born 1985), Japanese streamer
- Junichi Kawai (河合 純一; born 1975), Japanese Paralympic swimmer
- Junichi Kogawa (古川 純一; born 1972), Japanese Nordic combined skier
- Junichi Komori (小森 純一; 1941–2015), Japanese three-cushion billiards player
- Jun'ichi Kōuchi (幸内 純一; 1886–1970), Japanese animator
- Junichi Masuda (増田 順一; born 1968), Japanese video game composer
- Junichi Miyashita (宮下 純一; born 1983), Japanese swimmer
- Jun'ichi Nakahara (中原 淳一; 1913–1983), Japanese graphic artist and fashion designer
- Jun-ichi Nishizawa (西澤 潤一; 1926–2018), Japanese engineer
- Junichi Okada (岡田 准一; born 1980), Japanese singer and actor
- Juniti Saito (born 1942), Brazilian Air Force general
- Junichi Sasai (笹井 醇一; 1918–1942), Japanese naval aviator
- Junichi Sato (佐藤 順一; born 1960), Japanese anime director
- Junichi Sawayashiki (澤屋敷 純一; born 1984), Japanese kickboxer
- Junichi P. Semitsu (born 1973), American professor of law
- Jun'ichi Sugawara (菅原 淳一; born 1959), Japanese voice actor
- Junichi Suwabe (諏訪部 順一; born 1972), Japanese voice actor
- Junichi Tazawa (田澤 純一; born 1986), Japanese baseball player
- Jun'ichi Tsujii (辻井 潤一; born 1949), Japanese computer scientist
- Junichi Usui (臼井 淳一; born 1957), Japanese long jumper
- Junichi Watanabe (渡辺 淳一; 1933–2014), Japanese writer
- Junichi Watanabe (footballer) (渡辺 淳一; born 1973), Japanese footballer
- Junichi Yamakawa, author of Kuso Miso Technique
- Jun'ichi Yoda (与田 凖一; 1905–1997), Japanese poet

== Fictional characters ==
- Junichi Kawanaka (純一), a pitcher in the manga One Outs
- Jun'ichi Tsubaki (純一), a character in the manga Rockin' Heaven
- Jun'ichi Nagase, a main character in the anime Akaneiro ni Somaru Saka
- Jun'ichi Aikawa, a hero character in the anime Choujuu Sentai Liveman

== See also ==
- 6052 Junichi, a main-belt asteroid
