= Lori Perkins =

American publisher

- Born: White Plains, New York, United States
- Education: New York University (B.A.)
- Occupations: Literary agent President, L. Perkins Agency; Book publisher Owner, Riverdale Avenue Books; Partner, RomanceBeat.com

Lori Perkins is an American literary agent, book publisher and author. In 2012, she founded Riverdale Avenue Books, an e-book publishing company, in Riverdale, Bronx.

== Early life and education ==
Perkins was born in White Plains, New York, and grew up in Upper Manhattan, where she went to Barnard School for Girls and graduated from The Bronx High School of Science in 1977. She earned a B.A. in art history and journalism from New York University in 1980.

== Career ==
In 1987, Perkins founded her own literary agency, the L. Perkins Agency in 1990, which has represented seven books on the New York Times Best Seller List including How to Make Love Like a Porn Star by Jenna Jameson, J.K. Rowling: The Wizard Behind Harry Potter by Marc Shapiro and The Hunger Games Companion by Lois Gresh. The New York Chapter of Romance Writers of America named her Agent of the Year in 2010.

She co-founded the e-publishing company Ravenous Romance in 2012 and was the editorial director from 2008 to 2012. The Story of L by Debra Hyde won a Lambda Literary Award in 2012, which was published by Ravenous Romance. In 2012, she founded Riverdale Avenue Books located in Riverdale, Bronx which publishes e-books and audiobooks. Riverdale's imprints include a Riverdale/Magnus joint imprint of LGBT titles as well as titles focusing on horror, science fiction and fantasy, erotica and romance, mystery and thriller. In 2013, Riverdale was named the Bisexual Publisher of the Year from the Bi-Writer's Association. Riverdale's authors include Cecilia Tan, Riki Wilchins, Trinity Blacio, Marc Shapiro, Chris Shirley, Gabby Rivera, and Andrew Gray. In February 2020, Riverdale Avenue Books acquired Circlet Press.

She is the author of The Cheapskate's Guide To Entertainment; How to Throw Fabulous Parties on a Budget, The Insider's Guide To Getting A Literary Agent, The Everything Family Guide to Washington, D.C., The Everything Family Guide To New York and Fifty Writers on Fifty Shades Of Grey (BenBella Books). She is also the co-author of Everything You Always Wanted to Know About Watergate* But Were Afraid to Ask with journalist Brian J. O’Connor, as well as the historical romance novella Two Dukes and a Lady and Two Dukes are Better Than One under the pseudonym Lorna James, co-authored with USA Today author Jamie Schmidt.

She is the editor of 1984 in the 21st Century, published by Riverdale Avenue Books, a collection of 25 essays and opinions on today's relevance of George Orwell's classic dystopian novel, Nineteen Eighty-Four. Perkins has also edited more than twenty erotica anthologies, including Hungry For Your Love, a zombie romance anthology, which was published by St. Martin's Press. In 2017, Perkins edited and published an anthology of 26 essays titled #MeToo: Essays About How and Why This Happened, What It Means and How to Make Sure It Never Happens Again.

She has blogged about feminism for the Women's Media Center and is an author member of Romance Writers of America and serves on the Lambda Literary Awards Host Committee.

== Personal life ==
She regularly speaks on panels and conferences on publishing and the value of female-centered erotica. Perkins is also a member of the Lambda Literary Awards Host Committee. After receiving chemotherapy following a cancer diagnosis, Perkins cut back to 50 hours/week at Riverdale Avenue Books.
