= Davina Anne Gabriel =

Kansas City writer (1954–2016)

Davina Anne Gabriel (c. 1954–February 26, 2016) was an active member of LGBTQ communities in Kansas City and a lesbian transgender activist. Gabriel wrote and edited for several publications, especially in the 1990s–2000s, including her own local transgender newspaper called The Fine Print. She created and contributed to TransSisters, a zine, including interviewing Sandy Stone and Leslie Feinberg.

== Writing and activism ==
According to Gabriel, she became involved in feminist movements beginning in the 1970s, and with lesbian, gay, and transgender (then transsexual) movements in the late 1980s.

=== Activism ===
In the 1990s she participated in debates about Camp Trans, a protest of the womyn-born womyn policy of the Michigan Womyn's Music Festival. She took part in the 1993 March on Washington for Lesbian, Gay, and Bi Equal Rights and Liberation as part of the "transgender contingent," which numbered "about forty persons".

In May 1995, Gabriel and other Transexual Menace members took part in a vigil in Richardson County, Nebraska to honor Brandon Teena, a murdered transgender man, on the first day of his murderer's trial. Around this time, Gabriel also worked with FTM International.

=== Publications ===
Gabriel published her own local transgender newspaper called The Fine Print.

She created, edited, and contributed to TransSisters: The Journal of Transsexual Feminism, an early and influential transfeminist zine, published between 1993–1995. In the September/October 1993 issue, Gabriel said of founding the publication:

"I decided to start this publication because I saw a need for a transsexual publication that presented a specifically feminist perspective, so as to create greater understanding and co-operation between the transsexual andfeminist communities, as well as to increase feminist consciousness among transsexuals, and to foster understanding of the phenomenon of transsexuality among non-transexual feminists".

Her work in TranSisters including interviewing Sandy Stone and Leslie Feinberg.

== Personal life ==
Gabriel underwent gender-affirming surgery in the late 1970s. Gabriel wrote in 1993 that "my feminist identification was among the major factors in my decision to undergo transsexual surgery".

== See also ==
- Diana Green (cartoonist)
