= Riverdale Avenue Books =

American publishing company

- Status: Active
- Founded: 2012
- Founder: Lori Perkins
- Country of origin: United States
- Headquarters location: Bronx, New York
- Publication types: Books
- Imprints: Desire, Riverdale/Magnus, Pop, Afraid, SFF, Truth, Dagger, Sports and Gaming, VerVe
- Official website: www.riverdaleavebooks.com

Riverdale Avenue Books, located in Riverdale, Bronx, New York, is a publisher of e-books, print books on demand and audiobooks founded in 2012 by Lori Perkins. Riverdale is a member of the American Association of Publishers and publishes between 50 and 75 books a year.

== Awards ==
In 2014, Riverdale Avenue Books was named "Bisexual Publisher of the Year" by the Bi Writers Association.

In addition to hitting Amazon's bestsellers lists, Riverdale's books and authors have won numerous awards. In 2017 Outside the XY: Queer Black and Brown Masculinity, edited by Morgan Mann Willis won an IPPY Gold Medal in the Gay/Lesbian/Bi/Trans Non-Fiction category and Queering Sexual Violence: Radical Voices from Within the Anti-Violence Movement, by Jennifer Patterson won an IPPY Silver Medal in the same category. In addition, Juliet Takes a Breath by Gabby Rivera won an IPPY Silver Medal in the Gay/Lesbian/Bi/Trans Fiction category. In 2016, Menage a Musketeer: A Novel of Swords and Debauchery by USA Today's Best Selling Author Lissa Trevor won the IPPY Gold Medal Award for Erotica and Finding Masculinity — Female to Male Transition in Adulthood by Alexander Walker and Emmett J. P. Lundberg won the IPPY Silver Medal for Gay/Lesbian/Bi/Trans Non-Fiction. In 2017 Juliet Takes a Breath was selected by the Amelia Bloomer Project Committee of the American Library Association (ALA) for the 2017 Amelia Bloomer List, which features the books with significant feminist content published in the previous 18 months that appeal to young readers. The Amelia Bloomer Project is part of the ALA, Social Responsibilities Round Table (SRRT) Feminist Task Force. Outside the XY: Black and Brown Queer Masculinity by Morgan Mann Willis was nominated as a Lambda Literary Award Finalist in the Transgender Nonfiction category.

At the onset of the Me Too movement, Riverdale published an anthology of 26 essays edited by Lori Perkins titled #MeToo: Essays About How and Why This Happened, What It Means and How to Make Sure It Never Happens Again.

== Imprints ==
Riverdale publishes its curated books under 13 imprints.

- Desire: erotica/erotic romance titles
- Riverdale/Magnus: LGBT titles
- Afraid: horror titles
- SFF: science fiction fantasy titles
- 120 Days: LBTQ pulp fiction titles
- Circlet : erotica/erotic romance titles
- Truth: erotic memoir titles
- Dagger: mystery/thriller/suspense titles
- Verve: lifestyle titles
- Hera: titles featuring true and fictional lives and loves of women aged 35 and up
- Pop: pop culture titles
- Sports and Gaming: sports and gaming titles.

In February 2020, Riverdale Avenue Books acquired Circlet Press.

== Authors ==
Riverdale's authors include Cecilia Tan, Riki Wilchins, Trinity Blacio, Lissa Trevor, Marc Shapiro, Chris Shirley, Gabby Rivera and Andrew Gray, among many others.

== Payment Issues ==
In 2021, Writer Beware reported receiving complaints from Riverdale anthology and book authors over publication delays, poor editing, missing royalty statements, and other communications issues. Writer Beware noted that Riverdale has a policy of not issuing royalty checks until amounts due reach or exceed $50, and that some of its anthologies appeared to sell in numbers too small for authors to reach this threshold. It also raised conflict of interest concerns over Perkins' simultaneous ownership of a literary agency which placed clients' manuscripts with Riverdale. An update in August 2025 claimed that some authors had not been paid in over a year.

== Local events ==
Riverdale is the only publisher in New York City with a reading series open to authors of erotica and erotic romance. The Downtown Series is held at People Lounge in New York City on the first Friday of every month, and the Uptown Series is held at An Beal Bocht in Riverdale, Bronx, on the second Monday of every month.
