= Club Skirts Dinah Shore Weekend =

Queer festival in Palm Springs, California, US

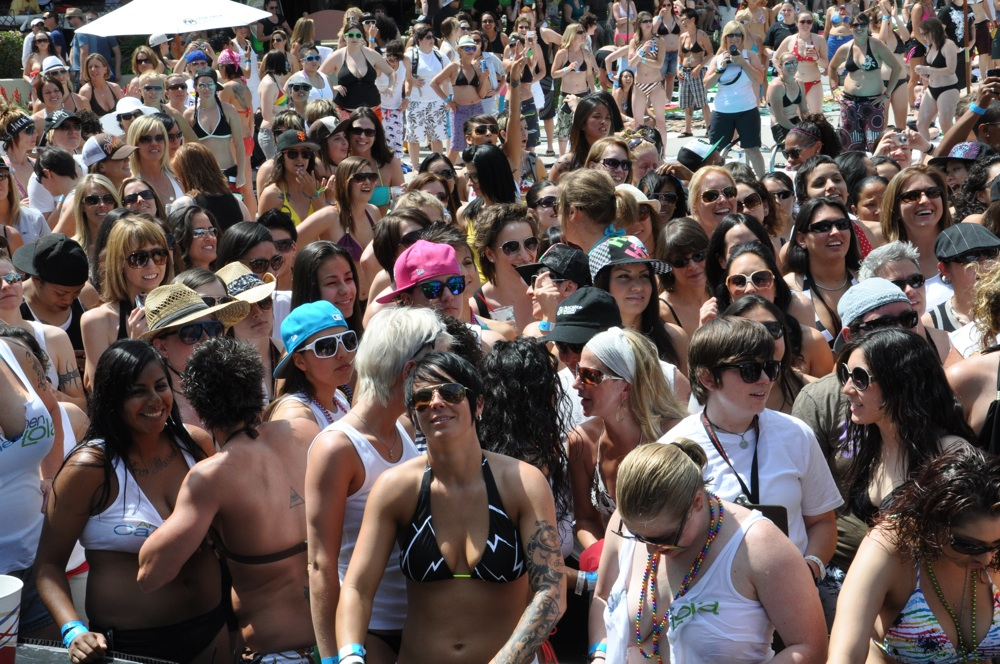
- Genre: Electronic music
- Dates: Each fall for 5 days
- Locations: Palm Springs, California, U.S.
- Years active: 1991–2019, 2021– (unofficial starting in 1986)
- Founders: Mariah Hanson
- Attendance: 15,000
- Capacity: Varies per venue
- Website: The Dinah

Club Skirts Dinah Shore Weekend, popularly known as "The Dinah", is a five-day weekend getaway and music festival catering to the lesbian, queer female and non-binary community that takes place annually in Palm Springs, California, United States.

== History ==
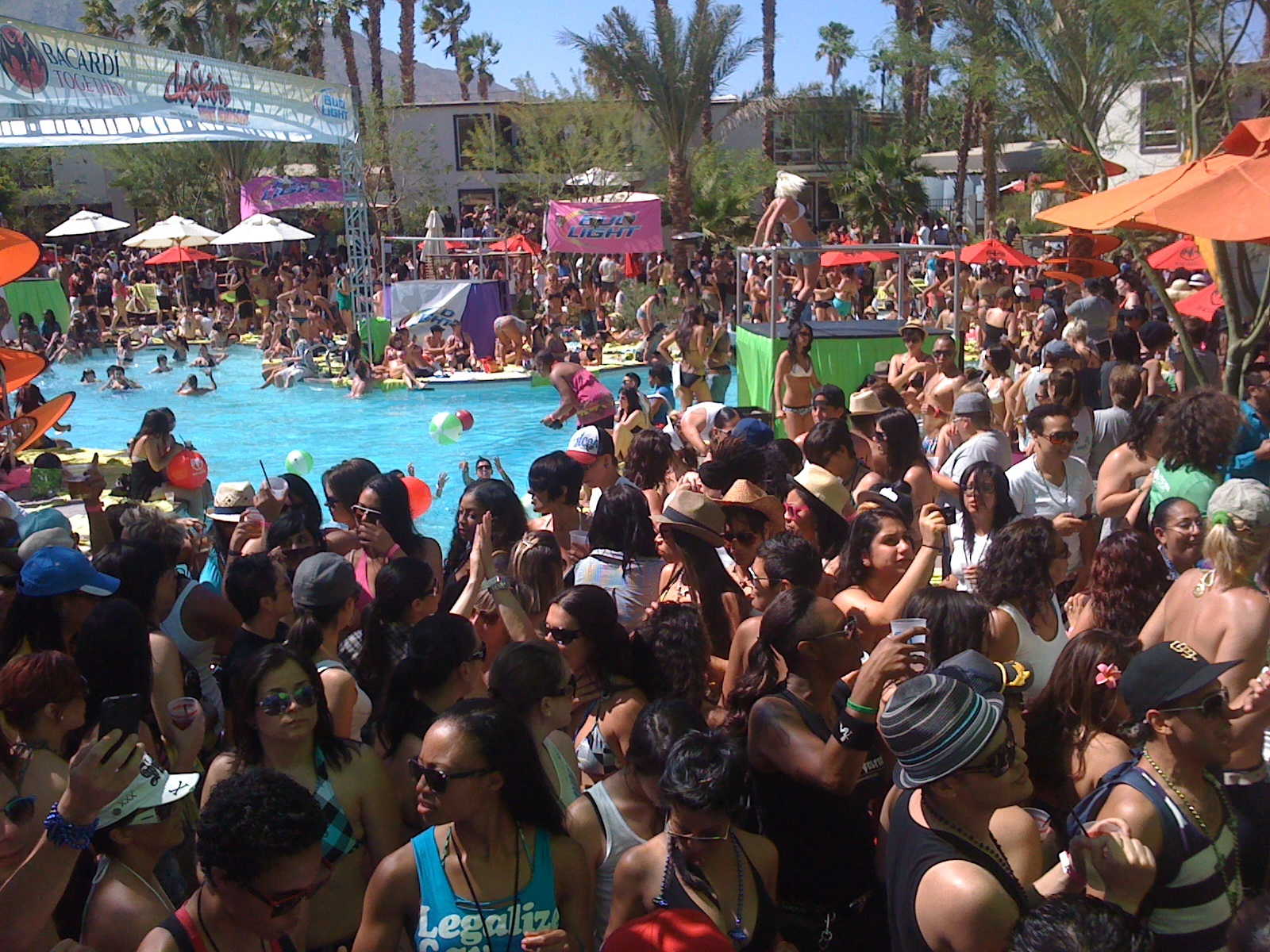
Pool Party 2011

The Dinah Shore Weekend, commonly referred to as The Dinah, was named after the late Dinah Shore, a singer, TV personality and renowned golfer whose women's major golf championship was held in the area at the time. The event is not authorised by the Shore estate or the tournament. Born Frances Rose Shore, in 1916, she lived in the Coachella Valley and is credited for having founded in Palm Springs the Colgate-Dinah Shore Winner's Circle women's golf tournament, now known as the LPGA's Chevron Championship in Texas. The Dinah initially coincided with the tournament, which took place the same weekend. The first unofficial Dinah Shore Weekend took place in 1986 when women began to flock to Palm Springs in conjunction with the tournament. "Loosely organized events with boomboxes and alcohol" took place during the tournament in the late 1980s. After-dinner parties following the golfing turned benefits for the Human Rights Campaign and the AIDS Service Foundation.

The first Dinah Shore event was produced as a one night party in 1991 by Mariah Hanson under her Club Skirts Presents The Dinah Marquee at the Palm Springs Art Museum. The early years had the event as co-produced by Hanson and Sandy Sachs and Dr. Robin Gans (promoters of Girl Bar in West Hollywood) beginning in 1992. In 2003 the television series The L Word had an episode set as happening at the weekend, which helped heighten its visibility. The following year, attendance doubled - the Saturday night party jumped to 2500 from 1200 the year prior. In 2005 the partnership between Hanson and Sach & Gans dissolved, with competing Palm Springs parties happening the same weekend. That state continued until 2012 when Sachs and Gans relocated to Las Vegas for an event which was called Girl Bar Dinah Shore Week Las Vegas.

The event initially was viewed as a party weekend, with the New York Times in 2007 calling it "Girls Gone Wild for Girls" and Sports Illustrated calling it "lesbian spring break". Beginning in the late 2010s, the event started to rebrand itself as "the largest and most famous girl party music festival in the world" in an effort to move away from that image.

In October 2021, it was announced that the tournament would move to Houston in 2023 as the Chevron Championship due to a new sponsorship agreement; while recognizing the event's tradition, Hanson stated she was supportive of the move, arguing that it made sense for the LPGA since the two events "[made] it difficult for a broad range of people to even come here to experience events that are happening because the economic bar is raised". Hanson stated the Dinah Shore Weekend would still be held in Palm Springs, but that it would likely move from April to September due to more favorable weather and hotel rates; that year's event (which marked its 30th anniversary) had already been delayed to October 2021 due to COVID-19.

In 2025, Hanson retired from organizing The Dinah, and stated that she would seek a new ownership group to give the event a "fresh voice". In February 2026, it was announced that The Dinah would be taken over by BellaRose Productions, a new group led by long-time staff members Bella Barkow (operations manager) and Rose Garcia (emcee). The pair stated that they planned to do "a bit of a facelift and touch-up" but preserve "what made The Dinah so successful", noting that Barkow was well-versed in the event's organizational operations, and Rose would serve as a public-facing figure.

== See also ==
- List of circuit parties
- List of electronic music festivals
- List of music festivals in the United States
- Michigan Womyn's Music Festival
- SuperShe Island
- Women's Week Provincetown
