= Chris Pureka =

American acoustic singer-songwriter (born 1979)

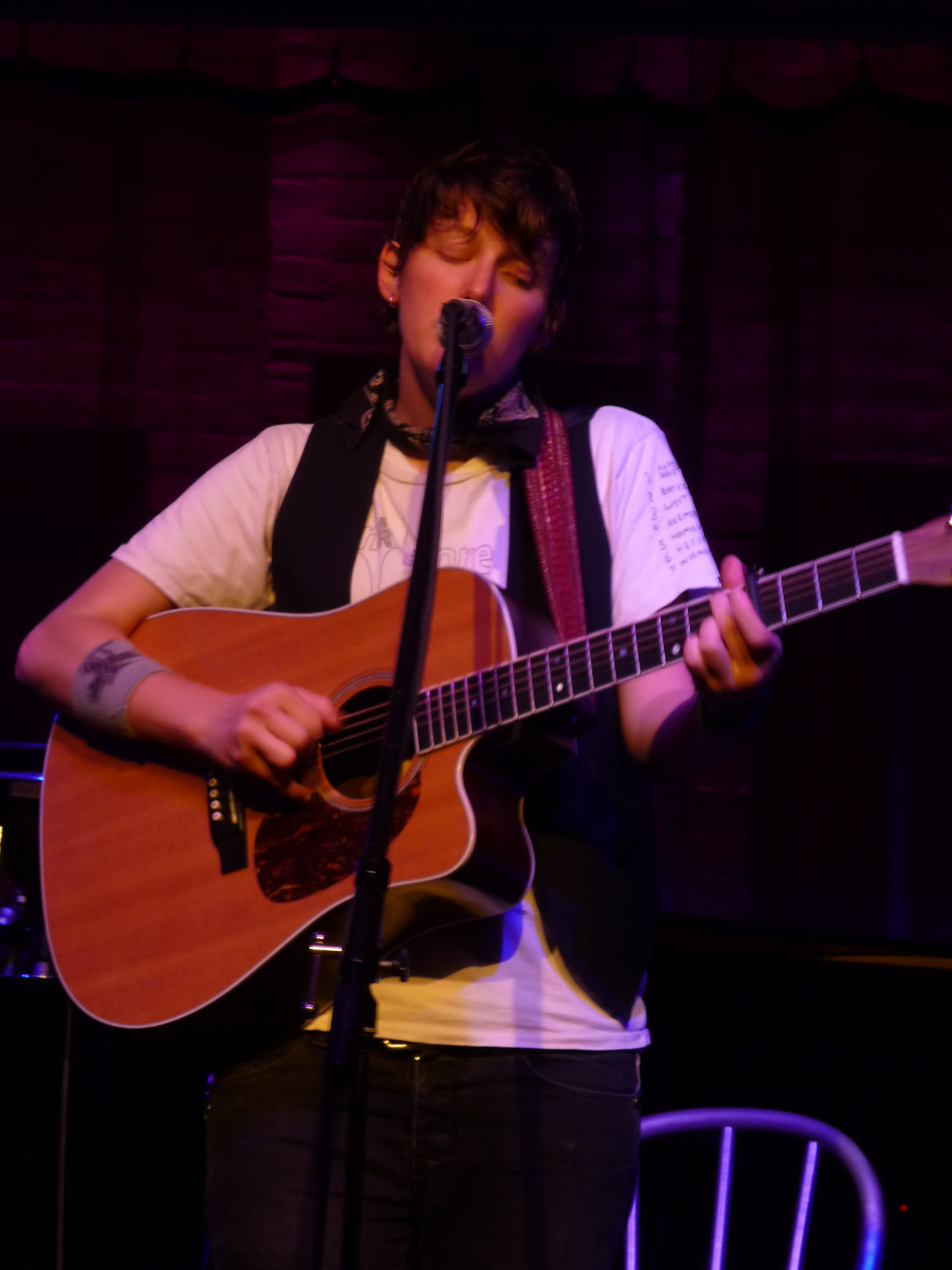
- Pureka in 2010

Background information
- Born: 1979 (age 46–47); Connecticut, U.S.
- Occupation: Singer-songwriter
- Instruments: Vocals; acoustic guitar
- Years active: 2001–present
- Label: Sad Rabbit Records
- Website: www.chrispureka.com

Chris Pureka (born 1979) is a genderqueer American acoustic singer-songwriter.

Pureka has received positive reviews in the long-running radical feminist publication Off Our Backs and other magazines. Their music does not deal explicitly with LGBTQ or political issues, focusing instead on emotional interactions between individuals.

== Early life and education ==
Raised in Connecticut, Pureka began writing songs at the age of eight and began playing the guitar at 16. They soon became a frequent performer at local coffee houses and open mics. As a young performer, they opened shows for such artists as Erin McKeown and Pamela Means while completing a degree in biology at Wesleyan University. After graduating, they worked in a microbiology research lab at Smith College in Northampton, Massachusetts, eventually leaving to focus on music full-time.

== Musical career ==
In June 2001, they recorded a self-titled seven-song EP in preparation for a three-month nationwide tour with lesbian folk poet Alix Olson. The EP, which was home-recorded in two weeks and featured Pureka playing back-up accompaniment on the mandolin and bass, was later mastered and reprinted for the 2005 summer tour.

In 2004, Pureka released Driving North, their first full-length album, earning rave reviews from fans and fellow artists alike. In 2006, they released Dryland, and toured the U.S. a second time as a headlining act. The album received rave reviews and was featured on the Paste magazine sampler in February 2007.

In May 2007, Pureka was a member of the month-long New American Songwriter Tour in New York City, Philadelphia, and Massachusetts. The tour also featured Krystle Warren, Jesse Harris, and Ryan Scott. In August, they played at the Michigan Womyn's Music Festival.

In July 2007, Pureka's "Swann Song" won first place in the acoustic competition on the independent music site OurStage.com. Because of their performance there, they won a spot to perform at the Virgin Music Festival in Baltimore, Maryland, and performed there on August 5. Pureka had previously also won the acoustic competition in April for their song "31 and Falling".

In October 2007, they were nominated for 2007's Outstanding Folk Act by the Boston Music Awards. They were also awarded an ASCAP Plus Award in the summer of 2007.

Pureka sold over 7,000 copies of their 2010 album, How I Learned to See in the Dark, independently, on their own label, Sad Rabbit Music, which they founded. During this time, they gained popularity by performing with artists such as Dar Williams, the Cowboy Junkies, Peter Mulvey, Ani DiFranco, Martin Sexton, Jeffrey Foucault, Kris Delmhorst, Melissa Ferrick, Catie Curtis, and Girlyman.

On January 20, 2009, Pureka released a fourth album, an EP entitled Chimera. The EP has seven tracks: one new, original song (with a prelude as the first track), a reworked studio version of a song off of their 2001 EP, three live tracks, and a cover of Bob Dylan and Ketch Secor's "Wagon Wheel". The hard copy of Chimera is complete with written commentary from Pureka on each track.

In April 2010, Pureka released their fifth album, How I Learned to See in the Dark, which they co-produced with Merrill Garbus.

In 2012, Pureka released a live album recorded at the Grey Eagle in Asheville, North Carolina, on January 19, 2011. It was recorded by Marsellus Fariss and mastered by Mark Alan Miller. Other musicians on the recording include Andy Alseri, Sebastian Renfield, Julia Read, and Jax Keating.

In 2016 Pureka released their first new music since 2013 with the album Back in the Ring.

== Musical style and influence ==
Pureka has been compared to artists like early Bruce Springsteen, Ryan Adams, Patty Griffin, Gillian Welch, and Mary Gauthier. They covered Welch's song "Everything Is Free" on Dryland and have expressed admiration for her music as well as that of Griffin. Pureka cites influences from Peter Mulvey and Pamela Means, as well as Ani DiFranco, but says that their own music differs greatly from DiFranco's often-outspoken political messages. Pureka has lent vocals and guitar playing to several tracks by artists like Alix Olson and Arjuna Greist; a notable track is "Checking My Pulse" with Olson, which went on to become a relative hit for Olson.

== Personal life ==
After their 2010 album release and a move to New York City, Pureka suffered from writer's block and emotional exhaustion. At the end of 2012, Pureka moved to Portland, Oregon. They are a pescetarian. Pureka uses they/them pronouns.

== Discography ==
=== Albums ===
- 2001: Chris Pureka EP
- 2004: Driving North
- 2006: Dryland
- 2009: Chimera (EP)
- 2010: How I Learned to See in the Dark
- 2012: Chris Pureka Live at the Grey Eagle 1.19.11
- 2013: Chimera II (EP)
- 2016: Back in the Ring
- 2021: The Longest Year

=== Television ===
Year	TV show	Song	Album (year)
2009	Brothers and Sisters S4E6	"Swann Song"	Dryland (2006)
2011	Covert Affairs S2E13	"Come Back Home"	Dryland (2006)
2012	Shameless S2E8	"Wrecking Ball"	How I Learned to See in the Dark (2010)
2012	Shameless S2E10	"Hangman"	How I Learned to See in the Dark (2010)
2012	Shameless S2E10	"Land Locked"	How I Learned to See in the Dark (2010)
2012	Shameless S2E12	"Damage Control"	How I Learned to See in the Dark (2010)
2013	Shameless S3E3	"Time is the Anchor"	How I Learned to See in the Dark (2010)
2014	Shameless S4E6	"Damage Control"	How I Learned to See in the Dark (2010)

Table references:
