= Blowfish (disambiguation) =

Blowfish are species of fish in the family Tetraodontidae.

Blowfish may also refer to:

- Porcupinefish, belonging to the family Diodontidae
- Blowfish (cipher), an encryption algorithm
- Blowfish (company), an American erotic goods supplier
- The Blowfish, a satirical newspaper at Brandeis University
- Lexington County Blowfish, a baseball team
- Vice President Blowfish, a character in the animated series Adventure Time episode "President Porpoise Is Missing!"

== See also ==
- Hootie & the Blowfish, an American rock band
