= The People We Keep =

2021 novel by Allison Larkin

- Author: Allison Larkin
- Language: English
- Genre: Contemporary fiction
- Publisher: Gallery Books
- Publication date: August 3, 2021
- Publication place: United States
- Media type: Print (hardcover & paperback)
- Pages: 368
- ISBN: 978-1-982171-29-2

The People We Keep is the fourth novel by American author Allison Larkin, and her first novel published under her full first name, having previously published under the pen name Allie Larkin. It was published by Gallery Books on August 3, 2021. Its plot revolves around the life of a young woman and musician named April Sawicki, who leaves her small New York town early to find a life of her own.

== Plot ==
In 1994, 16-year-old April Sawicki lives in a motorless motor home on the outskirts of Little River, New York. She barely sees her father, who spends most of his time with his girlfriend Irene and her son, and her mother left the family when she was young. The novel begins with April stealing and/or borrowing her elderly neighbor's car to go perform at an open mic night; she plays guitar and dreams of being a musician. She performs two original songs that night and gains confidence in her abilities for the first time. April feels stuck in Little River, as her boyfriend Matty keeps trying to convince her to marry him out of high school, but she can't stomach the thought of living the rest of her life in her hometown. Her only other friend in town is Margo, a diner owner whom her father used to date and for whom April works. After her father maliciously smashes her guitar, April takes matters into her own hands by stealing Irene's car and leaving Little River.

April finds herself arriving in Ithaca, New York, where she begins staying overnight in her car at a campground nearby that's on the verge of closing for the season. She makes a friend named Carly at a coffee shop called Cafe Decadence on the Ithaca Commons, where she soon begins working. Margo assures April that her father won't come looking for her. At Decadence, April meets an older boy named Adam whom takes a liking to her, and slowly convinces her to start staying with him at his apartment. He feels he understands April's position as he also was forced to leave home early. April lies to him and tells him she's 19 years old. When Adam and April begin a romance, he shares with her that he was seduced by his stepmother when he was only 16. With this knowledge, April realizes she can never come clean to him about her real age because it would hurt him too much. Following a confrontation with Rosemary, Carly's ex-girlfriend, April feels cornered and decides to leave Ithaca and Adam, even though it kills her to. Before leaving, she discovers a guitar Adam had intended on gifting to her for Christmas, and takes it with her.

Three years later in 1997, April has travelled throughout the state of New York and the United States, making a sparse income as a musician; she's even recorded a CD. Following an altercation with a dangerous man she meets after a gig, April takes to the road again. Her encounters include Justin, a privileged college student from a wealthy family with whom she becomes romantically involved. Feeling impulsive, the two of them drive to Florida where she lies to him and says they can stay at her uncle's house when in fact they were staying in an unoccupied rental home. Justin feels betrayed and contacts his father to send him a plane ticket to fly back to New York, and April continues on. In North Carolina, she meets Ethan, a gay theatre professor who takes her in and gets her a job performing at his straight friend Robert's bar. She and Robert end up dating and April begins to make a home with Ethan when she discovers she's pregnant. Robert and Ethan are thrilled, but April secretly knows she's pregnant with Justin's child. Feeling cornered once again by her lies, she flees.

While pregnant, April waits tables in Florida, saving up for an apartment when Margo contacts her to say her father is dying from lung cancer. She races back to Little River but her father has already died by the time she arrives. She refuses to attend his funeral, but ends up meeting her half-sister July in the church parking lot. April drives to Binghamton to tell Justin about her pregnancy, but he reacts badly by slut shaming her and insists it cannot be his child. Feeling more lost than ever, she returns to Ithaca with postcards she has written to Carly over the years but never sent. In a turn of events, she ends up in labor and injured at the campground where she used to stay and wakes up in the hospital surrounded by Carly, Margo, and Ethan, who has taken a job in Ithaca. Surrounded for the first time by a chosen family who loves her, April decides to stay in Ithaca with her child, Max, finally realizing that there are people we get to keep in life who will love and care about us.

== History ==
Larkin first began writing The People We Keep in 2006, and had worked on it for 12 years before it was sold to Gallery, facing numerous rejections. In an essay for Writer's Digest, she stated that her original agent who had sold her first novel Stay (2010) was not interested in the chapters of The People We Keep she had been drafting, writing: "I didn’t know then that once you publish a book, you’re generally seen as what you’ve published. Finding people who could view me (and April) with clear eyes would take another 10 years. Stay had carved out a small box for me, and everyone seemed to expect my writing to fit in it neatly. I was encouraged to push April to the back burner and write books that fit in the box. Working with two more editors and three more agents, I wrote and published two novels that could be marketed in a similar vein to Stay, but I couldn’t stop writing about April. I wrote several drafts a year."

In an interview with the Ithaca Times, Larkin shared that her original idea for The People We Keep came from hearing the songs "This Is the Sea" by The Waterboys and "Iowa" by Dar Williams, saying: "Something about the combination of those two songs just jiggled something loose in my head and April kind of showed up." She has also cited the music of Chris Pureka as being a significant influence on the novel and its characters. The novel, some of which takes place in Ithaca, New York, was partially inspired by Larkin's own experience as a student at Ithaca College between 1995 and 1997. In an interview with The Cornell Daily Sun, she revealed that April's tough personality had been off-putting for some editors in the past, who encouraged the author to make the character "nicer." Larkin believes that the MeToo movement helped shift perspectives on the novel's protagonist, as it exposed perceptions on the public roles of women. She stated: "I think that the fact that we weren’t talking about all of those things lent itself to people wishing April could be nicer. And that’s not really an acceptable thing to say anymore."

== Reception ==
The People We Keep received generally positive reviews from critics. Publishers Weekly found it to be a "hopeful story" and wrote that "music and the generosity of strangers provide healing in Larkin’s emotionally expansive latest." While they found some parts of the narrative to be contrived, they found the supporting characters and April's struggles as a young woman to be authentic. The Toronto Star wrote that The People We Keep is a "not a book to pick up lightly — it will make you fall in love with the characters, it will break your heart, it will make you laugh and cry and feel all the emotions the characters feel through author Allison Larkin’s tremendous talent for bringing characters to life." Critic Donna Edwards called Larkin's writing "simple yet profound," stating: "The novel demands that readers pause to digest it in spite of the urge to keep devouring every word. April is a difficult character to leave behind, but The People We Keep gratifies readers with a keenly satisfying ending that feels real and beautiful and worth the tears shed to get there." Nanette Donohue of Booklist gave it a starred review and wrote: "Larkin has created a memorable character in April, whose journey toward belonging and self-acceptance will resonate with readers. The depiction of the mid-1990s is pitch-perfect and will invoke feelings of nostalgia, especially in Gen Xers who came of age during this era." Actress Rachel Bilson, writing for Book of the Month (who selected the novel as its book club pick a month ahead of its publication), said that while she didn't agree with every choice the protagonist made she understood them, saying: "For all the hard questions it poses, The People We Keep is ultimately about resilience, compassion, and the fact that the good folks really are out there—if we can just find the courage to give them a chance."

Likewise, Country Living magazine selected it as their Front Porch Book Club pick the month of its publication, writing: "Allison has a knack for distilling tender scenes down to their essence, and you’ll fall in love again and again alongside April—and shout at her when she leaves, even as you know, you know, why she does what she does. The People We Keep is a story for all of us who have yearned for the home we know we deserve and are afraid to fight for. It’s a story of hope and belonging and the power of songs to carry us toward healing. But mainly, it’s a story about the families we make and the people we build them with." Writing for Shelf Awareness, Julia Kastner stated that The People We Keep is "intimate, urgent and direct," elaborating: "This is a novel of great empathy, about connections and coming of age, built families and self-acceptance. It contains heartbreak and redemption, and a plucky, irresistible protagonist. For any reader who's ever wished they could go, or wished they could stay." Jeffrey Davies of Book Riot chose it as one of the best books of 2021, writing: "Championing the power of self-love and found family, Allison Larkin reminds us throughout The People We Keep that there is always beauty to be found in chaos and that this life is ours to choose." In a separate article for Book Riot the following year, Davies referred to the novel as the "quintessential portrayal of found family" and called it "a genuinely beautiful and moving story."
