= Diana Green (cartoonist) =

American comic book creator (1954–2026)

- Born: February 19, 1954 New Mexico, U.S.
- Died: January 18, 2026 (aged 71) Minneapolis, Minnesota, U.S.
- Areas: Graphic design, storyboarding, drawing, illustration, writing
- Notable works: Tranny Towers, Gay Comix

Diana Green (February 19, 1954 – January 18, 2026) was an American comics creator. She is known for her debut comic strip Tranny Towers and was one of the first transgender cartoonists to include openly transgender characters in her comics. Throughout her career, she contributed to various LGBTQ publications, such as Gay Comix and "Omaha" the Cat Dancer, as well as publishing her own works.

== Background ==
Green was born on February 19, 1954, and spent her early years of childhood in New Mexico. Her parents were both in the United States Air Force, so Green moved around numerous times before she settled down in Minneapolis, Minnesota. Diana Green came out as transgender in 1985 and underwent gender reassignment surgery a couple of years later. She was an outspoken activist for state-funded surgeries. She was an advocate for AIDS victims, illustrated and designed for the Minnesota AIDS Project, and donated to LGBTQ+ charities and organizations.

== Education ==
Green received a BFA in Comic Book Illustration from the Minneapolis College of Art & Design (MCAD). She is credited as the first transsexual woman to earn this BFA. She had a Master's Degree in Liberal Studies from Hamline University, with a focus on creative nonfiction and screenwriting.

== Career and works ==
=== Notable works ===
Green made her comic debut in 1993 with the publication of "Little Athena in Genderland" in the 18th issue of Gay Comix. It is recognized as one of the earliest forms of transgender representation in LGBTQ+ comics, and tackles issues of body dysmorphia, gender norms, and alienation.

Tranny Towers, her first reoccurring comic strip, was published in Lavender Magazine from the years 1994-1995. It was viewed as a landmark work as one of the earliest self-identified transgender comics. This strip showcased some of the first explicitly transgender characters in comics.

Green interned for Reed Waller and contributed to the popular erotic comic "Omaha" the Cat Dancer. Her work can be seen in issues 13 and 14.

Green was also a staff cartoonist for the magazine TransSisters between 1994 and 1996. Created by Davina Gabriel, TransSisters served as a "Journal of Transsexual Feminism." The magazine included discussions of transgender theory, socio-political issues related to the transgender community, interviews with queer women, and various short comics and illustrations. Diana Green worked in collaboration with other artists and writers, such as Alison Bechdel, Leslie Feinberg, and Rachel Pollack.

In 1999, Green self-published Speedy Ricuverri and his All-Girl Orchestra, a comic book which sold almost all of its copies. In 2006, she self-published another comic book titled The Street Giveth and the Street Taketh Away.

=== Teaching and academic publications ===
Green became an adjunct professor at MCAD in 2006. She taught studio courses in comic book creation, comic book writing, illustration, animation, and advanced drawing. She also taught liberal arts courses, including comic book history, underground comics, and film history. She taught grade school and high school level courses at Aldrich Community Center in comic book creation as well. In addition to her teaching, Green was a conference coordinator and an education director at MCAD.

Green contributed written work to many books and publications regarding comic book history and queer comics. Some of her contributions include:

- Duncan, Randy, et al. The Power of Comics: History, Form, and Culture. Bloomsbury Academic, 2019.
- York, Chris. Comic Books and the Cold War: 1946-1962; Essays on Graphic Treatment of Communism, the Code and Social Concerns. McFarland, 2012.
- Clanton, Dan W. The End Will Be Graphic: Apocalyptic in Comic Books and Graphic Novels. Sheffield Phoenix Press, 2012.
- Duncan, Randy, and Matthew J. Smith. Icons of the American Comic Book: From Captain America to Wonder Woman. Greenwood, 2013.

=== Later work ===
Green later worked on turning the Tranny Towers stories into a graphic novel titled TransScending. Green was also in the process of releasing a graphic memoir called Sharp Invitations, which she released in short, one-page illustrations weekly on her blog and her Twitter account, accompanied by a personal analysis of the work.

Green finished her film script, Private Myths, which centers around lesbian relationships.

Green showcased her illustrations and new works at art exhibits, primarily those held at MCAD, in addition to posting them on her social media accounts.

== Death ==
Green died in Minneapolis on January 18, 2026, at the age of 71.
