= Built Like That =

Built Like That may refer to:

- Built Like That (song), a song by Scott Storch
- Built Like That (album), a spoken word album by Alix Olson
