= Denise Norris =

American transgender activist

- Education: University at Albany; Adelphi University
- Occupation: Transgender activist
- Known for: Co-founding The Transexual Menace
- Children: 1
- Awards: Stonewall Spirit of Pride Award (2012); Harvey Milk Alumnus Award (2016)

Denise A. Norris is an American transgender activist who co-founded the transgender rights activist organisation, The Transexual Menace with Riki Wilchins in 1993. In 2012, she received the Stonewall Spirit of Pride Award from the Stonewall National Museum and Archives for her contributions to the transgender community. In 2014, she created the Institute for Transgender Economic Advancement.

== Biography ==
In 1980, Denise Norris enrolled as a freshman at the University of Albany, Albany, New York from Garden City, Long Island. In 1981, according to Norris, there were no psychological services or support for LGBT students. She transferred to Adelphi University but did not graduate.

In 1989, Norris began hormone therapy and in 1992, she underwent gender-affirming surgery at Montefiore Medical Center in the Bronx. She worked as IT director in Manhattan.

== Personal life ==
Denise Norris got married and had a daughter, Courtney. The marriage ended in divorce.
