= Women's Week Provincetown =

Women's Week Provincetown (formerly Women's Weekend) is an annual LGBT festival founded in 1984 that primarily serves lesbians. Held in mid-October in Provincetown, Massachusetts on Cape Cod, it is attended by almost 2,000 women and is "the longest running lesbian cultural event in the Northeast."

The Women Innkeepers of Provincetown organized Women's Week to attract lesbian tourists to Provincetown during the slower fall season. The founding organizers, many of whom were queer women who had bought and restored guest houses in the seaside vacation destination, wrote to past guests inviting them to attend a clambake on the beach during Columbus Day weekend. The weekend event grew into an annual week-long festival featuring over 300 events, including film screenings, author readings, dune tours, concerts, dance parties, stand-up comedy, ceremonies, and a community clambake.

Notable Women's Week performers have included comedian Kate Clinton, Lea DeLaria and Holly Near.

In October 2020, organizers responded to COVID-19 constraints by offering Women's Week in a virtual format using Zoom videoconferencing to host two "stages," one for performances and one for talks over three days. Provincetown's LGBTQ+ theme weeks, including women's week, resumed in-person in 2021.

== See also ==
- Club Skirts Dinah Shore Weekend
- Michigan Womyn's Music Festival
- SuperShe Island
- Circuit party
