= Juliet Takes a Breath =

Young adult novel by Gabby Rivera

Juliet Takes a Breath is a young adult novel by Gabby Rivera. It was published on January 27, 2016, by Riverdale Avenue Books. The book's main character begins identifying as a lesbian. The book has won awards and has been met with attempts to have it removed from school libraries. NPR described the book as a coming-of-age story about a college student from the Bronx establishing her identity. The story takes place in 2003. A review in the Los Angeles Times Book Review notes it became an "instant classic" after its debut from a small publisher. It has been adapted into a graphic novel in 2020.

Rivera went on to write the first-ever queer Latina super hero for Marvel.

== Plot ==
The main character, Juliet Milagros Palante, is a 19-year-old Latina who has recently started identifying as a lesbian. She has just finished her first year of college and living away from home for the first time. During this year she quietly came out to some of her peers and started dating a white girl who Juliet doesn't feel tries to really understand her. Juliet is from the Bronx in New York City. For the summer while when the book takes place Juliet has traveled to Portland, Oregon to intern with a white, feminist author, Harlowe Brisbane, who wrote a book about vaginas that inspired Juliet. In Portland, Juliet gets to know other queer people of color for the first time. Her new experiences open her up to the idea of having a community that she shares more than one identity with. She also discovers the racism in Harlowe's feminism, forcing her to create her own understanding of feminism as the queer, brown, person she is trying hard to be proud of being.

== Awards ==
Juliet Takes A Breath was selected by the Amelia Bloomer Project Committee of the American Library Association (ALA) for the 2017 Amelia Bloomer List.

== Graphic novel ==
A graphic novel adaptation of the book was published in December 2020 by BOOM! Studios, with art by Celia Moscote. It was a finalist for the 2021 Prism Award for Best Comic from a Mainstream Publisher.
