= Alix Olson =

American poet (born 1975)

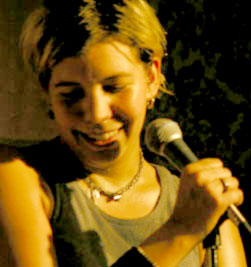
- Olson in June 2003
- Born: 1975 (age 50–51); Bethlehem, Pennsylvania, U.S.
- Occupations: Oxford College of Emory University professor and spoken word poet

Alix L. Olson (born 1975) is an American poet who works exclusively in spoken word. She uses her work to address issues of capitalism, racism, sexism, homophobia, heterosexism, misogyny, and patriarchy. She identifies as a queer feminist.

== Early years and education ==
Olson was born in Bethlehem, Pennsylvania in 1975 to parents who were both politically minded professors and held ideals that she believes were passed along to her. She has recalled early childhood memories sitting under a table coloring protest signs.

Olson attended Stockholm University in 1996. She received a BA from Wesleyan University in 2007 and a PhD in political science from the University of Massachusetts Amherst with a graduate certificate in advanced feminist studies.

== Career ==
Olson taught as faculty at the Juniper Institute for Young Writers at University of Massachusetts Amherst in Summer 2011 and 2012, at CSU Summer Arts at California State University in Fresno, California, and at the Eleanor Roosevelt Center at Val Kill's Young Women's Leadership.

=== Poetry and media ===
In 1997, Olson began performing at the Nuyorican Poets Café, where she helped develop the 1998 Nuyorican poetry slam team. She and fellow Nuyorican team members Lynne Procope, Steve Colman, and Guy LeCharles Gonzalez won the 1998 National Poetry Slam championship in Austin, Texas. Soft Skull Press published Burning Down the House, an anthology that showcased poetry by Olson and her teammates and poetry by Roger Bonair-Agard, the 1998 Nuyorican Team's coach. In 1999, Olson beat Stacey Ann Chin in a slam off, giving her the title of the OUTWRITE slam champion. Olson recorded and published three spoken word CDs: Built Like That (2001), Independence Meal (2004), and Protagonist (2014). She was the subject of the documentary Left Lane: On the Road with Folk Poet Alix Olson, which was released in 2004. In June 2006, Olson co-hosted the Sixth Annual Outmusic Awards with Ari Gold at the Knitting Factory in Rochester, New York.

She is editor of Word Warriors: 35 Women Leaders in the Spoken Word Revolution with a foreword by Eve Ensler, a spoken word anthology published in 2007, which features contributions by Patricia Smith, Eileen Myles, Suheir Hammad, Staceyann Chin, Cristin O'Keefe Aptowicz, Lynn Breedlove, Michelle Tea, and others. Olson's poem "Warrior" is referenced in the book Fight like a Girl: How to be a Fearless Feminist by Megan Seely.

In July 2014, blogger Justyn Hintze wrote about Apple's engraving service, which she felt was exhibiting sexist programming. According to Hintze, the programming came to her attention when she attempted to engrave her new iDevice with an Olson lyric, "I’ll give myself a lube job, shake my broomstick 'til my clit throbs", a lyric Hintze described as "feminist, sex-positive, and it makes me smile. Every. single. time."

The blog and subsequent campaign on Twitter, #MyClitMyChoice, garnered media attention.

Olson's work has been featured on NPR, HBO's Def Poetry Jam, Rachel Maddow's Air America radio show, The New York Times, The Washington Post, Curve magazine, Girlfriends magazine, The Advocate, Out magazine, the Lesbian Review of Books, and other media outlets. She has appeared on the covers of Lambda Book Report, Lavender Lens, Velvet Park magazine, and Ms. magazine. She has spoken to the National Organization for Women, GenderPAC, the Lesbian Summit, and poetry festivals in several countries. In 2004, she performed for at March for Women's Lives in Washington, D.C.

=== Oxford College of Emory University ===
Olson is an Associate Professor of women's, gender, and sexuality studies at Oxford College of Emory University in Oxford, Georgia. Her latest book is called The Ends of Resistance: Making and Unmaking Democracy (Columbia University Press, 2024).

== Critical analysis ==
bell hooks described Word Warriors: 35 Women Leaders in the Spoken Word Revolution (Seal Press, 2007), which Olson edited, as "daring to be heard.. to resurrect you." Historian and activist Howard Zinn called Olson "an ingenious poet, a brilliant performer, a funny person, a serious thinker. Quite simply, extraordinary." A critique in Utne Reader calls Olson "...the spoken word diva everyone's talking about." In describing her live performances, The Progressive calls Olson "an electrifying performer who seduces the audience with wit and energy, spinning tales of life on the road between her fiery poems. A sharpshooter with theatrical flair, Olson oozes both love and rage." The Progressive referenced Olson as a "word warrior", and Ms. Magazine described her as a "road-poet-on-a-mission."

== Books ==
- Word Warriors: 35 Women Leaders in the Spoken Word Revolution, Seal Press, 2007
- Burning Down the House, Soft Skull Press, 2003

== Awards ==
- 1998: National Nuyorican Poetry Slam champion, Austin, Texas.
- 1999: OUTWRITE slam champion
- 2000: New York Foundation for the Arts fellowship
- 2002: Three-time nominee for "Outstanding Artist-Activist" for the OUTMusic Awards
- 2003: Rape Crisis "Visionary Award" along with Margaret Cho and Nobuko Oyabu
- 2004: "Best activist" (along with MoveOn) as part of Venus magazine's "Hott List" and OutMusician of the Year by OutMusic for Excellence in artistic expression and LGBT community activism.
- 2011: Political science travel grant from the University of Massachusetts Amherst
- 2012: Research assistantship as part of the Graduate Research Initiative Program and the University of Massachusetts Amherst's "Student Choice Teaching Award"
- 2013: Center for Research on Families fellowship and Distinguished Teaching Award, University of Massachusetts Amherst
- 2016: New Political Science Christian Bay Award
- Olson was awarded the Barbara Deming Award and offered a Hedgebrook Fellowship, which she declined

== Discography ==
- 2001: Built Like That
- 2003: Independence Meal
- 2014: Protagonist
