= Allison Larkin =

American author (born 1977)

- Born: 1977 (age 48–49); Somers, New York, U.S.
- Education: St. John Fisher University (BA); Ithaca College
- Occupation: Novelist
- Writing career
- Pen name: Allie Larkin
- Genre: Contemporary fiction
- Website: allielarkinwrites.com

Allison Larkin (born 1977) is an American author. Under the pen name Allie Larkin, she published the novels Stay (2010), Why Can't I Be You (2013), and Swimming for Sunlight (2019). Her fourth and fifth novels, The People We Keep (2021) and Home of the American Circus (2025), were published under her full name by Gallery Books.

== Life and career ==
Larkin was born and raised in Somers, New York. Between 1995 and 1997, she was a theatre major at Ithaca College.

After dropping out of college and working as a bartender for several years, Larkin graduated with a Bachelor of Arts in interdisciplinary studies, public relations, and creative writing from St. John Fisher University in Rochester in 2002. She worked as a freelance business writer and at a mortgage company after that. In 2008, she published a short fiction piece called "Bathtub Mary" in the spring issue of the Summerset Review, which also appeared in Slice magazine later that year. After leaving her job to pursue writing full-time, she began developing what would become her first novel that had originated as a short story she wrote as a writing exercise for a course in university. Stay was published by Dutton Adult in June 2010. Some of Larkin's nonfiction appeared in the anthology I'm Not the Biggest Bitch in This Relationship the following year.

Larkin's second novel, Why Can't I Be You, was published by Plume in February 2013. The novel was optioned by Universal Pictures in 2014. In 2016, her nonfiction was once again featured in the Writer's Digest anthology Author in Progress. Swimming for Sunlight, her third novel, was published in April 2019 by Atria Books. Beginning with her fourth novel, Larkin began publishing under her full first name. The People We Keep was published by Gallery Books in August 2021. She began writing the novel in 2006 and had worked on it for 12 years, facing numerous rejections. The People We Keep was selected as a Book of the Month club pick a month ahead of its release and as a Front Porch Book Club pick by Country Living magazine the following month.

In October 2024, Larkin announced the release of her fifth novel and the second to be published by Gallery, Home of the American Circus. It was published in May 2025 and was also selected as a Book of the Month club pick.

== Bibliography ==
- 2010: Stay
- 2013: Why Can't I Be You
- 2019: Swimming for Sunlight
- 2021: The People We Keep
- 2025: Home of the American Circus
