= Roger Bonair-Agard =

Trinidad and Tobago writer and poet

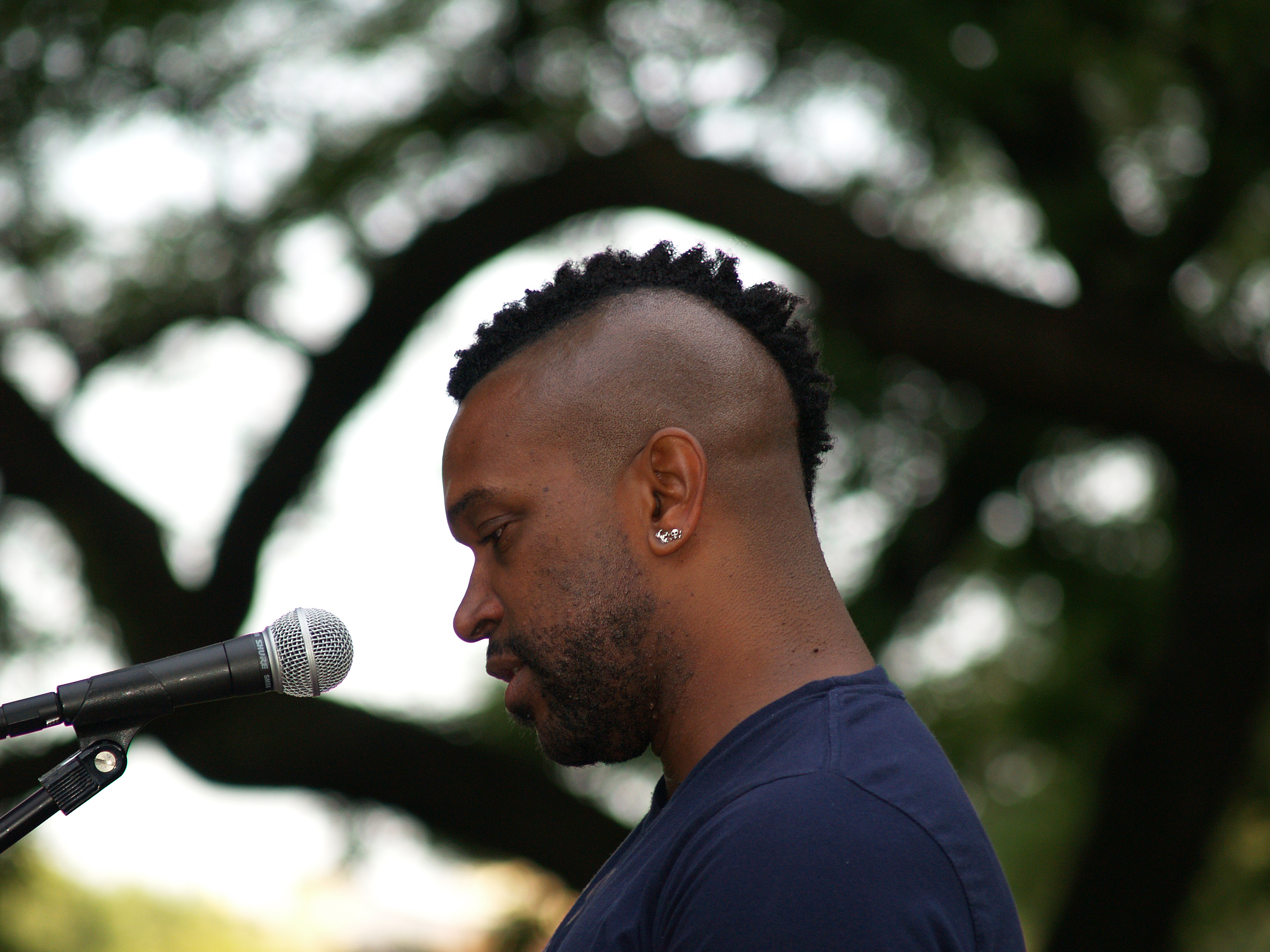
Roger Bonair-Agard

Roger Bonair-Agard is a poet and performance artist. He has made numerous television and radio appearances, has led countless workshops and lectures, and has performed his poetry at many US universities as well as at international festivals in Germany, Switzerland, Milan, and Jamaica. He has been accused of sexual abuse by multiple people, including other poets.

== Biography ==
Born in Trinidad, Bonair-Agard moved to the United States in 1987, intending to begin university and eventually pursue law, but finding himself "instead exploring the seediest sides of New York City life". He studied Political Science at Hunter College, and was about to take the Law School Admission Test when he decided to concentrate on poetry rather than a law career.

He was a member of the 1997 Nuyorican Poets Cafe Poetry Slam team and later coached the 1998 Nuyorican Poets Cafe Poetry Slam team, which went on to win the National Poetry Slam Championship that year in Austin, TX.

He then co-founded the louderARTS Project and has been on the 1999, 2001, 2003, 2004, 2005, 2006 and 2007 louderARTS Poetry Slam teams. In 1999, he won the individual competition at the National Poetry Slam. He was formerly the Artistic Director for louderARTS. He has also been adjunct professor in the Creative Writing Department at Fordham University. Over the past decade he has worked with the youth at Urban Word in New York City, at Volume in Ann Arbor and with poetry youth organizations in Seattle, San Francisco, and the Adirondack Valley, NY. Bonair-Agard is also a Cave Canem fellow, and has studied under Yusef Komunyakaa, Cornelius Eady, Marilyn Nelson, Toi Derricotte, and Patricia Smith.

He currently teaches creative writing with the Free Write Arts & Literacy Program at the Cook County, Illinois Temporary Juvenile Detention Center in Chicago, Illinois.

== Sexual assault allegations ==
In 2012, a poetry workshop in Ann Arbor, Volume, stopped working with Bonair-Agard after they were alerted to allegations of sexual misconduct against Bonair-Agard. At the 2013 National Poetry Slam a "safe spaces" council was created to identify sexual predators within the slam poetry community. During the competition, Rebecca Hunter, the Executive Director of Young Chicago Authors was alerted by the safe spaces council that her employee, Bonair-Agard, was on the list of alleged sexual predators. The same month, one of Bonair-Agard's Young Chicago Authors coworkers accused him of rape. After learning of this allegation, a former student of Bonair-Agard's, Melissa, publicly alleged that Bonair-Agard assaulted her when she was underage and he was almost twice as old as her. Melissa immediately provided Young Chicago Authors with extensive documentation of her allegation and Rebecca Hunter said Melissa and two others alleged victims of Bonair-Agard came forward to share their alleged experiences of sexual assault.

In February 2014, a group of over 20 young authors submitted a list of demands to YCA for safer spaces. In response, the Executive Director, Rebecca Black, and the Artistic Director, Kevin Coval, said that Bonair-Agard was no longer contracted with YCA and that they were going through internal processes. In 2017, a survivor's account of Bonair-Agard's abuse was published in the Rutgers University Press book Killing Poetry: Blackness and the Making of Slam and Spoken Word Communities by Javon Johnson.

On December 21, 2020, the organization Free Write Arts & Literacy released this statement:

In 2016, Free Write leadership promoted Roger to a position of leadership where he remained until early December 2020 when his employment was terminated. For six years, we chose not to stand in solidarity with survivors of harm and instead protected an abuser. We told ourselves that the internal work we were doing to design policy and structures to account for the harm was “transformative” when really it was insufficient and cowardly, with no public accountability offered to the community. This caused further harm caused to talented, trusted Free Write staff members and community partners, some of whom unwittingly found themselves in proximity to the employee while simply doing their jobs with Free Write, while others who strongly advocated for accountability were ignored or placated.

The organization added to their statement on February 17, 2021.

On February 24, 2021, another poet and former Young Chicago Authors coworker of Bonair-Agard's came forward to accuse him of rape in 2013. The next day, YCA executive director Rebecca Hunter and artistic director Kevin Coval apologized in a statement for their past inaction and acknowledgements that their response was not enough. Hunter resigned her post ahead of her scheduled departure in June 2021, and Coval’s employment was also ended.

In March 2021, Chicago Public Schools suspended its partnership with Young Chicago Authors, due to the allegations against Bonair-Agard, as well as the outcries from the poetry community, including Van Cook’s statement alleging that leadership within the YCA organization knew Bonair-Agard was dangerous and did not act. This triggered journalism by Chicago Reader that logged two decades of survivors' accounts of abuse by predators affiliated with YCA.

== Bibliography ==
- Where Brooklyn At?, 2016, Aquarius Press
- Bury My Clothes, 2013, Haymarket Books
- Gully, 2010, Peepal Tree Press
- Tarnish and Masquerade, 2006, Cypher Books
- Burning Down the House, 2000, Soft Skull Press, co-authored with Stephen Colman, Guy Lecharles Gonzalez, Alix Olson, and Lynne Procope

== Discography ==
- List in a Valley of Bone: New and Selected Poem Recordings (2009)
- Chantuel
- NYC Slams
- 5 Past 13

== Filmography ==
- The 2000 National Poetry Slam Finals – 2000, Poetry Slam Inc.
- Poetry slam – 1999, Princeton: Films for the Humanities & Sciences (with David Deutsch, Elizabeth Farnsworth, and Ariana Waynes).
