= Lynne Procope =

American poet

Lynne Procope is a Trinidadian-born American poet. She is one of the founders of the louderARTS Project. In 1998, Procope made the 1998 Nuyorican Poetry Slam team. She and her fellow Nuyorican team members Alix Olson, Steve Coleman and Guy LeCharles Gonzalez would go on to win the 1998 National Poetry Slam Championship that year in Austin, TX. This championship would lead to Soft Skull Press publishing the anthology Burning Down the House which showcased poetry by Olson, Procope, Coleman and Gonzalez as well as poetry by the 1998 Nuyorican Team's coach, Roger Bonair-Agard. Her best known poems include "Elemental Woman", "Flectere" and "Evidence of Injury". Her writing focuses on the human experience of women and marginalized groups.

== Bibliography ==
- Burning Down the House, 2000, Soft Skull Press, co-authored with Roger Bonair-Agard, Stephen Colman, Guy Lecharles Gonzalez, and Alix Olson.
- "Shine (for Joe Bataan)," "All Night," 2015, Haymarket Books, Contributor, Edited by Kevin Coval.
