= Circlet Press =

American publishing company

- Founded: 1992
- Founder: Cecilia Tan
- Country of origin: United States
- Headquarters location: Cambridge, Massachusetts
- Fiction genres: Science fiction erotica, BDSM
- Official website: www.circlet.com

Circlet Press is a publishing house in Cambridge, in the U.S. state of Massachusetts. It was founded by Cecilia Tan, who is also its manager. It specializes in science fiction erotica, a once uncommon genre, and its publications often feature BDSM themes.

== History ==
Cecilia Tan founded the house in 1992 after researching the markets for publication of her own stories, which combined science fiction plotlines with explicitly sexual themes. At the time, science fiction publications turned away such material as unsuitable for their audience, and most publishers of erotic material were hard-core pornographers.

Circlet Press has been identified with a peer group of start-up "alternative sexuality" publishers and businesses, including Greenery Press, Daedalus Publishing, Black Books, Obelesk Books, Blowfish, and The Stockroom). Their arrival also coincided with the burgeoning of a women's erotica movement, evidenced by the publication of many upscale trade paperback anthologies such as Herotica, Best American Erotica edited by Susie Bright, On A Bed of Rice (ed. Geraldine Kudaka), Slow Hand (ed. Michele Slung), and many others coming from the mainstream publishing houses.

Lesbian bookseller Gilda Bruckman, who for years headed one of the leading women's bookstores in the U.S. (New Words, formerly in Cambridge, MA), said, in support of the idea that Circlet's efforts were part of a growing trend in women's erotica, "I think the younger generation of women who see themselves as feminists... feel that it's central to their being. It's having control of the expression of one's sexuality, not being restricted to societal norms."

In February 2020, Riverdale Avenue Books acquired Circlet Press.

== Effects on the market ==
The effect that Circlet had on the mainstream science fiction seems to be twofold. One, the house nurtured a new generation of writers who were emboldened to use genre elements in their erotic fiction and erotic elements in their genre fiction. Two, by mapping out new territory, Circlet expanded what was possible, and acceptable, in sf/fantasy. The first tentative forays into "spicier" material by many of the mainstream science fiction imprints bore fruit in the form of strong sales and good reviews for titles such as Polymorph by Scott Westerfeld and The Black Jewels Trilogy by Anne Bishop. Tan spoke on many panels at science fiction conventions such as the World Fantasy Convention, World Science Fiction Convention, Philcon, Arisia, Boskone, and Lunacon about mixing and cross-pollinating genres.

With erotica forging the way, the influx of romance into sf/f was not far behind, as writers like Catherine Asaro and Laurell K. Hamilton built readerships that included sf/f readers, mystery readers, and romance readers. Hamilton's "Anita Blake" books have grown sex-focused and explicitly sexual, and legions of "paranormal romance" writers and readers have followed in her wake.

== Honors and awards ==
Reviews praising Circlet's efforts appeared in Publishers Weekly, Lambda Book Report, Feminist Bookstore News, and many other publications.

Circlet Press's books have been nominated for the Lambda Literary Awards, Independent Publisher Book Awards ("IPPY" awards), the Benjamin Franklin Awards, and the Spectrum Awards.

== Writers ==
Authors published by Circlet Press include:

- Laura Antoniou
- Catherine Asaro
- Hanne Blank
- Francesca Lia Block
- Lela E. Buis
- M. Christian
- Amelia G
- Evan Hollander
- Raven Kaldera
- Nancy Kilpatrick a.k.a. Amarantha Knight
- Midori
- Mary Anne Mohanraj
- Yvonne Navarro
- Carol Queen
- Lawrence Schimel
- Simon Sheppard
- Dave Smeds, aka Reed Manning
- Jennifer Stevenson
- Cecilia Tan
- TammyJo Eckhart
