= SuperShe Island =

Women's private island resort in Raseborg, Finland

Coordinates: 59.9124861°N 23.7315774°E

- Type: Private
- Industry: Lifestyle
- Founded: 2017
- Founders: Kristina Roth
- Headquarters: Fjärdskär, Finland

SuperShe Island was a female-owned private island resort, exclusively for women, located off the coast of Finland in the Baltic Sea. The island is administratively located in the town of Raseborg, while the SuperShe community is global. In late 2023, shipping executive Deyan Mihov bought the island for a million euros. After the purchase, he stated he has no specific plans for the island. The island was sold in late 2023, but the SuperShe community continues to thrive as a global network, according to its website.

== Overview ==
The 8.4-acre island was bought by American entrepreneur Kristina Roth, former owner of the tech consulting company Matisia Consultants. Roth sold her company in 2016 for an undisclosed amount, and purchased the island in 2017 to transform it into a women-only space. The island was opened to the SuperShe community on 23 June 2018.

The activities offered included yoga, meditation, kayaking and hiking, as well as motivational talks and discussions. SuperShe Island was formerly the home base of the SuperShe community, consisting of more than 8,000 women from 122 countries at the time. It is now headquartered in the U.S.

The island attracted media attention worldwide due to the price of a week-long stay being 4,600 euros. In 2018, the prospective guests had to undergo a rigorous selection process, via the organization's website wherein Roth used to look for the guest's personality, which is why some critics labeled the project as "elitist," however, Roth has rejected the criticism. As of December 2019, the island was only open to active members of the SuperShe App.

After purchase, male construction workers were working on the island to lay lines for power and water, and to renovate accommotation. That was the only time men were allowed on the island, besides Roth's close family and friends.

== See also ==
- Womyn's land
- Women's Week Provincetown
- Feminism
