= Minnesota AIDS Project =

Organization in Minnesota, United States

The Minnesota AIDS Project (MAP) was the first grassroots organization in the U.S. state of Minnesota to help people with HIV/AIDS. Founded in Minneapolis, MAP provided education, prevention resources, and services for HIV-positive people and people with AIDS in response to the HIV/AIDS crisis.

== History ==
After Bruce Brockway was the first Minnesotan to be diagnosed with AIDS in 1982, Brockway and others in his community formed the Minnesota AIDS Project in order to respond to the disease in Minneapolis's gay community.

The organization worked to prevent the spread of HIV and to care for those living with the virus. Staffed entirely by volunteers at its founding, MAP operated a hotline out of peoples homes. Volunteers would answer questions about symptoms, give advice on care, and provide local health and social service information. The group also gave presentations on safe sex and distributed condoms. Additionally, MAP talked to print and television journalists attempting to dispel rumors about HIV. MAP volunteers helped care for the dying, support their loved ones, and provided "buddies" to accompany people with HIV/AIDS to their appointments.

In 1985, MAP began to receive grant funding from state and county health departments. The organization hired staff, moved into an official space, and broadened its work. The organization founded a housing program, educated visitors at the Minnesota State Fair, and created an annual Pledgewalk for AIDs.

In 2018, MAP became the Rainbow Health Initiative, which eventually formed JustUs Health.
