= The Transexual Menace =

Trans rights organization

- Formation: 1993
- Type: Direct Action
- Website: transexualmenace.org

The Transexual Menace, or The Menace, is a transgender rights activist organization founded in New York City in 1993. It was the first direct action group of its kind, and grew to be a national organisation with 24 chapters. After a period of dormancy, The Menace returned in 2025 as a response to transphobic policies made by President Donald Trump and other politicians.

== History and activities ==
The group was founded in 1993 by transgender activists including Riki Wilchins and Denise Norris, in response to the exclusion of transgender people from lesbian, gay, and bisexual Pride marches.

=== Media attention ===
The Transexual Menace organized groups of demonstrators outside courthouses during trials involving anti-transgender crimes, for instance in the rape and murder of Brandon Teena. The movement became the subject of iconic gay liberation filmmaker Rosa von Praunheim's documentary "Transexual Menace".

=== T-shirts ===
The trademark image for the Transexual Menace was a Goth-styled black T-shirt with the group's name in blood-dripping red letters. The Menace T-shirts were designed by Norris, with a design emulating the Rocky Horror Picture Show logo. The T-shirts were significant in that they allowed transgender visibility at a time when passing as cis was highly encouraged and desired. As described by Wilchins in the book TRANS/gressive, "If you passed [as cis], you were safe. But pulling on the T-shirt screwed all of that forever".

Pictures are available of the Pittsburgh chapter's T-shirts and the Texas chapter's T-shirts.

=== Esquire interview and response ===
Esquire approached the group to do a piece about transgender activism. It was published under the title "The Third Sex - Now the men who have decided they are actually women are on the march. Welcome to the transgender revolution" on April 1, 1995.

The Menace members were angry and the group immediately picketed Esquire's offices; eventually the writer of the story came down to apologise. In her book TRANS/gressive, Riki Wilchins describes the incident as reflective of the climate at the time, with "friendly fire" coming from people or institutions that were not even actively hostile.

=== The Gay Games ===
The Menace protested trans women's exclusion from the Gay Games. Wilchins describes how trans women, unlike the other participants, had to "jump through a series of demeaning hoops" including providing medical records, a hormone test and a full gender verification regime. Six members of the NYC chapter crashed the board meeting of the Gay Games and instantiated a change of these regulations. The transgender-exclusionary regulations were re-instated four years later.

== 2025 revival ==
Denise Norris decided to revive the Transexual Menace in January 2025, following transphobic executive orders by President Donald Trump. The revival started on the group's official Bluesky account.

== See also ==
- Lavender Menace
