= Riki Wilchins =

American LGBT activist

Riki Anne Wilchins (born 1952) is an American activist whose work has primarily focused on the impact of gender norms.

== Background ==
Wilchins founded the first national transgender advocacy group (GenderPAC). Their analysis and work broadened over time to include discrimination and violence regardless of individuals' identity. While this perspective has been widely accepted, its breadth has provoked criticism by some in the transgender community. Wilchins's work and writing have often focused on youth, whom they not only see as uniquely vulnerable to the gender system's pressures and harm, but whom they see as capable of "looking with fresh eyes". Wilchins's work has been instrumental in bringing transgender rights into the mainstream LGBTQ movement, and has helped bring awareness of the impact of gender norms to a wider audience, and they are credited with coining the term "genderqueer." Riki Wilchins is Jewish.

In 1996, they starred in Rosa von Praunheim's film Transexual Menace. Wilchins's early activism with the "Hermaphrodites With Attitude!" protest group and intersex leader Cheryl Chase led to the founding of Intersex Awareness Day. In 2001, Wilchins's work resulted in them being selected one of just six community activists named by Time magazine among its "100 Civic Innovators for the 21st Century". In 2009, Wilchins debuted The MANGina Monologues (A One Trans Show) at DC's Busboys & Poets, one of the first transgender standup shows. A founding member of Camp Trans, since the mid-1990s Wilchins has been highly active in founding a number of organizations and events focused on gender issues, including:

- The Transexual Menace, the first large direct action group for transgender rights, which was modeled along the lines of Queer Nation and which at one point boasted representatives in 40+ cities (co-founder Denise Norris).
- a 1996 demonstration held with members of Intersex Society of North America, now marked as Intersex Awareness Day.
- NYC Gay Community Center Gender Identity Project (co-founder Dr. Barbara Warren, Dir. of Social Services).
- NYC Gay Community Center Transgender Health Empowerment Conference, an annual event (co-founder Dr. Barbara Warren, Dir. of Social Services).
- Camp Trans, an annual educational event outside the Michigan Womyn's Music Festival that contested the exclusion of anyone who was not deemed a "womyn-born womyn" (co-founders Janice Walworth, Nancy Jean Burkholder).
- National Coalition for Sexual Freedom (co-founder Susan Wright, its first Exec. Dir.)
- National Gender Lobby Day, an annual event on Capitol Hill (co-founder Phyllis Frye).

== GenderPAC ==
In 1995, Wilchins founded the Gender Public Advocacy Coalition (GenderPAC), a tax-exempt organization focused on gender rights issues. GenderPAC originally focused on the transgender community, but gradually broadened its focus to include anyone who suffered discrimination or violence because of their gender identity or gender expression. GenderPAC described its mission as the creation of "classrooms, communities, and workplaces [that] are safe for everyone to learn, grow, and succeed — whether or not they meet expectations for masculinity and femininity." In late 1999, the organization was incorporated and received tax-exempt status. In 2009, it rebranded and relaunched as a new organization, TrueChild, effectively ceasing operations as GenderPAC.

While GenderPAC's Executive Director, Wilchins helped dozens of corporations as diverse as IBM, JP Morgan Chase, and Citigroup, as well as major funders like the Arcus and Gill Foundations to expand employment non-discrimination policies to include gender identity and gender expression. GenderPAC's Congressional Non-Discrimination Pledge eventually had almost 200 sponsors, including both Republicans and US Senators. They helped compile and publish the GENIUS (Gender Equality National Index for Universities & Schools) Index, which rated and ranked schools' adoption of gender identity protections. During their watch, GenderPAC also launched the GenderYOUTH Network, which eventually supported student groups at 100+ schools in creating safer and friendlier environments for those who were gender non-conforming on their own campuses.

== 1st National Survey of TransViolence ==
In 1995, with help from researcher Emilia Lombardi, GenderPAC compiled and published the "1st National Survey of TransViolence", based on surveys provided by more than 500 respondents.

In 2006, in partnership with Global Rights, GenderPAC researched and published "50 Under 30: Masculinity & the War on America's Youth", the first human rights report to document an under-reported tide of violence that had claimed the lives of more than 50 young people aged 30 and under attacked because of their gender identity or gender expression from 1994 to 2004. With a fresh round of attacks, the report was reissued just two years later as "70 Under 30". More than 80 groups endorsed the reports' recommendations, including the Leadership Conference on Civil and Human Rights, National Organization for Women (NOW), National Council of La Raza (NCLR), Interfaith Alliance, and the Human Rights Campaign. The report was used by the House Sub-Committee which marked up the Matthew Shepard Hate Crime Act (the final bill included gender identity as a protected category and was eventually passed and signed into law).

Wilchins received their bachelor's degree from Cleveland State University in 1982 and a masters in clinical psychology from the New School for Social Research in 1983. Wilchins then founded Data Tree Inc., a computer consulting company specializing in banking and brokerage on Wall Street. Wilchins is an out transsexual lesbian feminist. In a 2017 article published in The Advocate, Wilchins said their pronouns were they/them/theirs.

== Awards ==
Works by Wilchins have been finalists for multiple Lambda Literary Awards. In 1998, Read My Lips was a finalist for the Transgender Literature category. In 2003, GenderQueer, by Joan Nestle, Wilchins, and Claire Howell, was a finalist for the Transgender Literature and Anthology Nonfiction categories.

== Author ==
Wilchins's essays and articles have appeared in:

- The Book of Everyday Resistance, edited by Lori Perkins. Riverdale Avenue Books, 2026. ISBN 978-1626017054
- "A New Vagina Didn't Make Her Sad (It Didn't Have To)." TSQ: Transgender Studies Quarterly. Vol. 7, No. 3 (August 2020): 345–348. DOI 10.1215/23289252-8552964.
- Contemporary Debates in the Sociology of Education, Rachel Brooks, Kalwant Bhopal, Mark McCormac (editors). Palgrave Macmillan, 1994. ISBN 978-1-137-26987-4
- The Encyclopedia of Identity, Ronald L. Jackson (editor). SAGE Publications, 2010. ISBN 978-1412951531
- Feminist Frontiers, Verta Taylor, Leila J. Rupp, Nancy Whittier (editors). McGraw-Hill Companies, 2008. ISBN 978-0073404301
- Gender Violence (Second Edition): Interdisciplinary Perspectives, Laura L. O'Toole, Jessica R. Schiffman, Margie L. Kiter Edwards (editors). NYU Press, 2007. ISBN 978-0814762103
- GENDERqUEER: voices from beyond the sexual binary, Joan Nestle, Clare Howell, Riki Wilchins (editors). alyson books, 2002. ISBN 1-55583-730-1
- Language Awareness: Readings for College Writers, Paul Eschholz, Alfred Rosa, Virginia Clark (editors). Bedford/St. Martin's, 2004. ISBN 978-0312407025
- The Meaning of Difference: American Constructions of Race, Sex and Gender, Social Class, Sexual Orientation, and Disability : a Text/Reader, Karen E. Rosenblum and Toni-Michelle C. Travis, editors, McGraw-Hill. ISBN 978-0-07-811164-8
- Negotiating Ethical Challenges in Youth Research, Kitty te Riele, Rachel Brooks (editors). Routledge,2013. ISBN 978-0415808460
- Out at Work: Building a Gay-Labor Alliance, Kitty Krupat, Patrick McCreery, editors. University of Minnesota Press, c2001. ISBN 0-8166-3740-7
- PoMoSexuals: Challenging Assumptions About Gender and Sexuality, edited by Carol Queen and Lawrence Schimel, Cleis Press, c1997. ISBN 1-57344-074-4
- Trans Bodies, Trans Selves: A Resource for the Transgender Community, Laura Eriskson-Schroth, editor. Oxford University Press, 2014. ISBN 978-0199325351
- Women on Women 3 : An Anthology of American Lesbian Short Fiction, edited by Joan Nestle and Naomi Holoch. Plume, 1996. ISBN 0-452-27661-6

They have also contributed articles to The Village Voice, The Advocate, and GLQ.

== Publications ==
=== Peer-reviewed research ===
- Transgender experiences with violence and discrimination, Lombardi, E.L., Wilchins, R., Priesing, D. Malouf, D.(2002). Journal of Homosexuality. 1, March, 2002, 89–101
- One percent on the burn chart: Gender, genitals, and hermaphrodites with attitude, David Valentine, Riki Wilchins (1997). Social Text. 52/53, 1997, 215–222
- The Moderating Effects of Support for Violence Beliefs on Masculine Norms, Aggression, and Homophobic Behavior During Adolescence, Paul Poteat, Michael Kimmel, Riki Wilchins (2011). Journal of Research on Adolescence, 21, 434–447

=== Books ===
- Read My Lips: Sexual Subversion & the End of Gender, Firebrand Books, 1997 ISBN 1-56341-090-7
- GenderQueer: Voices from Beyond the Sexual Binary, with Joan Nestle and Clair Howell Co-Editors, Alyson Books, 2002. ISBN 1-55583-730-1
- Queer Theory/Gender Theory: an Instant Primer, Alyson Books, 2004. ISBN 1-55583-798-0
- TRANS/gressive: How Transgender Activists Took on Gay Rights, Feminism, the Media & Congress… and Won!, Riverdale Avenue Books, 2017. ISBN 1-62601-368-3
- Burn the Binary! -- Selected Writings on Living Trans, Genderqueer & Nonbinary, Riverdale Avenue Books, Oct, 2017. ISBN 1-6260-1407-8
- Gender Norms & Intersectionality: Connecting Race, Class & Gender, Rowman & Littlefield, Mar, 2019. ISBN 1-78661-084-1
- Bad Ink: How The New York Times Sold Out Transgender Teens, Riverdale Avenue Books, 2024. ISBN 1-62601-682-8
- When Texas Came for Our Kids: How Evangelical Extremists Launched a War on Transgender Teens, Riverdale Avenue Books, 2023. ISBN 1-62601-671-2
- When Loving Your Kid Is a Crime: Parents of Transgender Children Speak Out, with Clare Howell, Riverdale Avenue Books, 2023. ISBN 1-62601-664-X
- Healing the Broken Places: Transgender People Speak Out About Addiction & Recovery, Amazon Kindle Books, 2024. ISBN 979-8991170000
- Burn the Binary!, Vol. 2, Riverdale Avenue Books, 2025. ISBN 978-1-62601-708-5
- The Transgender TIMES: How the New York Times Discovered & Mis-Covered Trans People from 1965 to 2015, Amazon Kindle Books, 2024. ISBN 979-8991170017
- Let's (Not) Talk About (Transgender) Sex: The Erotic Erasure of Trans Desire & Sexuality, Bloomsbury Publishing, 2026. ISBN 978-1-35057-450-2
