= Built Like That (album) =

Studio album by Alix Olson
- Released: June 2, 2001
- Genre: Spoken word
- Label: Subtle Sister Productions

Alix Olson chronology
Built Like That (2001)	Independence Meal (2003)

Built Like That is the debut album of folk poet and spoken word artist Alix Olson. The album was released on CD and consists of spoken words with musical accompaniment. It was originally released on June 2, 2001 under the label of Subtle Sister Productions.

== Track listing ==
1. "Eve's Mouth"
2. "Daughter"
3. "Cute for a Girl"
4. "Built Like That"
5. "Deadbeat Daddy"
6. "America's On Sale"
7. "Checking My Pulse"
8. "Subtle Sister"
9. "The Compliment"
10. "Dear Mr. President"
11. "Warriors"
12. "Myth"
13. "Sticks"
14. "Hit It Girls"
15. "Armpit Hair (Mammally Factual)"
16. "Witches"
17. "Picnic Table"
18. "Popcorn and Laughter"
19. "Gender Game"
20. "Criminal"
21. "Cunt Cuntry"
22. "I Believe"
