= Camp Trans =

Protest of trans exclusion at Michfest

Camp Trans was the name of an annual demonstration and event held outside the Michigan Womyn's Music Festival (MWMF or Michfest) in Oceana County, Michigan. This demonstration was held by transgender women and their allies to protest against the Festival's policy of excluding trans women from attending, until the Music Festival's end in 2015.

== History ==
Camp Trans was sparked by a 1991 incident, in which Nancy Burkholder was ejected from the festival, after refusing to answer when a woman asked her whether or not she was transgender. This event was documented by the Gendertrash From Hell zine in Issue 2 Vol 1, which included the names of 3 other festival attendees who were originally asked to leave along with Nancy. This issue also include survey results and questions from a survey given to festival attendees about trans inclusion at the festival. The MWMF maintained a womyn-born womyn policy since its inception, as evidenced by posters from the first festival in 1975. Each year starting in 1993, a group of women, both transgender and cisgender, protested the exclusion of trans women from the event. Initially, these protests were small and sometimes carried on inside of the camp.

A more organized group of transgender women and their allies began camping and holding demonstrations outside the gate. After a five-year hiatus, Camp Trans returned in 1999, led by transgender activists Riki Ann Wilchins and Leslie Feinberg, as well as many members of the Boston and Chicago Lesbian Avengers. The events of this year drew attention and controversy, culminating in tensions as a small group of transgender activists were admitted into the festival to exchange dialogue with organizers and to negotiate a short-lived compromise allowing only transgender women who had sex reassignment surgery on the festival land.

In the early 1980s and in 1999, a transgender musician who had transitioned 10 years earlier performed in MWMF. During the 1999's Camp Trans event, a number of transgender women purchased tickets and were admitted to the MWMF. A similar claim of victory was published by Camp Trans that year.

== Events of 2006 ==
By 2005, activists at Camp Trans and MWMF had become frustrated with the boycott effort and felt that a combined effort of external and internal activism on the grounds of MWMF might be more effective in securing inclusion.

In 2006, a transgender woman organizer of Camp Trans named Lorraine Donaldson was sold a ticket to the 31st annual Michigan Womyn's Music Festival. On Tuesday, August 8, 2006, Donaldson approached the workers at the front gate of the festival and asked if she could purchase a ticket. She was instructed to read an outdated handout that was printed by the festival office in 2000 following the controversial events surrounding the "Michigan Eight" protest. This paper indicated that the festival was still enforcing a policy of exclusion for transsexual women. When Donaldson pointed out that the document was outdated and asked for a current version from the workers, they told her that none was available. Donaldson requested that the workers seek up-to-date policy information in writing from the office and informed them that she would return the next morning. That same day, the newly organized Yellow Armbands pro-inclusion support group held their first meeting at the Watermelon Tree in the common dining area of the festival.

On the morning of Wednesday, August 9, Donaldson again approached the box office workers near the front gate and asked to purchase a ticket. She was met at the gate by three members of the Yellow Armbands and one organizer of Camp Trans, all of whom witnessed Donaldson disclosing her trans status to the box office manager, before being sold a ticket and given an orange wristband that designated her as a "festie". Donaldson attended the festival for the remainder of the week and participated at a trans inclusion workshop that was presented by trans woman Emilia Lombardi, who was also an organizer with Camp Trans and who was sold a ticket to the festival on Friday, August 11, as well. The workshop was listed as part of the official festival program and both Donaldson and Lombardi were open about being trans women at the workshop that was attended by over 50 people. Donaldson and Lombardi also continued to join the Yellow Armbands mealtime gatherings, where they were met with support from festies and workers. The conclusion of the 2006 festivals in Hart, Michigan was marked with noted optimism and collaborative spirit between Camp Trans constituents and their pro-inclusion supporters at MWMF, as was noted immediately by members of the community and media. A camper also captured the good news as it was presented onstage by a Camp Trans committee member and later posted it on YouTube.

== 2006 press release controversy and resulting organizational changes ==
Following the 2006 festival, a small group of Camp Trans organizers issued a press release that stated that the MWMF had "ended its policy of exclusion." A disagreement ensued within the Camp Trans and Yellow Armbands organizations over whether or not this press release was ethical due to issues of transparency and consent.

Camp Trans argued that the press release was a deliberate and necessary tactic designed to bait WMWF founder Lisa Vogel into responding with a transphobic press release which would make the parameters of the "wbw-policy" officially known. Supporters of this tactic felt that because Vogel hadn't given the Camp Trans organization permission to republish the letter, nor was the policy (or what Vogel referred to as an "intention") available in writing on the MichFest website or elsewhere, that this was the only way that Camp Trans could ostensibly prove that the policy actually existed. Others felt that the motivation behind the press release was nebulous and not supportive or inclusive of Donaldson or others who were involved in the positive developments that occurred in the summer of 2006. They also believed that the press release caused unnecessary conflict between inclusion activists and the festival office and they preferred to focus on the larger community who were clearly supportive of trans women attending in 2006. Regardless, Vogel did in fact issue a response where she stated again that the festival is intended for women-born-women, and that they hope and expect trans women to respect that intention. Following the press release fallout, Donaldson resigned from Camp Trans and joined the Yellow Armbands as an organizer.

In 2007, the Yellow Armbands blog was frozen by an organizer who resigned from the activism due to lingering issues regarding lack of transparency in the inclusion movement. Other activists also resigned over concerns that Camp Trans was privileging the voices of trans men over trans women in their organization. The remaining inclusion activists at Yellow Armbands created a new online community and blog and renamed their organization Fest For All Womyn.

Donaldson returned to MWMF in 2007 with the newly renamed Fest For All Womyn/Yellow Armbands and camped in The Twilight Zone area of the festival along with other trans women and female inclusion supporters.

2007 was also a landmark year for Camp Trans, because for the first time in their 16-year history, they held elections for their organizational positions. Camp Trans organizers celebrated this as a positive step in the right direction when the majority of elected positions were filled by trans women.

== 2010 festivals ==
There were tensions during the 2010 festivals. A piece published in both Anarchist News and the queer zine Pink and Black described a confrontation with a tow truck driver. The driver allegedly threatened to kill Camp Trans members with a tow cable after he was asked to turn off his engine during a Camp Trans speech.

Pink and Black wrote that there was vandalism during the festival, saying that, in one incident, someone painted the words "Real Womyn Have Cocks" in a MichFest kitchen. The zine also said a flyer was distributed that read: "Second-Wave 'Feminists', / A hot load from my monstrous tranny-cock embodies womanhood more than the pieces of menstral (sic) art your transphobic cunts could ever hope to create. / Love, Womyn-born-Monsters".

== Since 2010 ==
There have been groups created "on the land" like Trans Women Belong Here, for support, care, and acquiring a "safe space" within MichFest. MichFest itself, however, ceased as an ongoing concern after its 40th season in 2015.

== UK Festival ==
In 2022 an art and community camping festival for and by trans people was held in Leighton Buzzard, inspired by and named after the original Camp Trans. The event was a success and took place again on a larger scale, with performances and workshops, in the summer of 2023.

In 2024 the festival moved to a new site in South Wales, and took place there again in September 2025 for approximately 300 attendees and staff.

== See also ==
- Transmisogyny
- Michigan Womyn's Music Festival
- List of transgender-related topics
- Lesbian Avengers
- Sexism
