= Gabby Rivera =

American writer and storyteller

- Education: Goucher College
- Occupation: Writer
- Known for: Juliet Takes a Breath (2016)

Gabby Rivera is an American writer and storyteller. She is the author of the 2016 young adult novel Juliet Takes a Breath, and wrote the 2017–2018 Marvel comic book America, about superhero America Chavez. Her work often addresses issues of identity and representation for people of color and the queer community, within American popular culture. Rivera is Puerto Rican and from the Bronx.

== Early life and education ==
Gabby Rivera was born to Martha and Charles Rivera. Rivera grew up in the Bronx borough of New York City, she is of Puerto Rican descent and grew up in a religious household of Pentecostal evangelicalism. An early love of reading and writing came from her mother, a kindergarten teacher. Rivera attended an all-girls private school in White Plains, New York. Rivera attended Goucher College in Towson, Maryland, graduating in 2004.

== Career ==
Rivera started her career and love for literature at the age of 17 by attending a local cafe for poetry nights. Starting her career in performance poetry, Rivera grew inspired by stories written by black, brown and queer authors. Rivera is an editor at Autostraddle, an online magazine for, about, and written by LGBTQIA+ women, non-binary people and sometimes trans men. Rivera is a mentor through her work as the youth programs manager at GLSEN.

=== Juliet Takes a Breath (2016) ===
Juliet Takes a Breath (2016) is a semi-autobiographical, fictional coming-of-age novel about a gay Latina woman from the Bronx dealing with her identity. In this story, Juliet Milagros Palante moves to Portland, Oregon for the summer to intern under Harlowe Brisbane, a white feminist writer and author of, "Raging Flower: Empowering Your Pussy by Empowering Your Mind".

=== America (2017-2018) ===
Miss America is a fictional superhero appearing in American comic books published by Marvel Comics and Marvel's first Latin-American LGBTQ character to star in an ongoing series. From 2017 to 2018, Gabby Rivera authored the America series, until it was cancelled by Marvel publishing.

The comic book series was nominated for Outstanding Comic Book at the 29th GLAAD Media Awards. Supreme Court Justice Sonia Sotomayor sent Rivera a letter, praising her work on the series and America Chavez.

=== B.B. Free series ===
B.B. Free is a comic book series that centers around a 15 year old navigating a post-climate change world with a plague, where mother nature kills greed. B.B. Free's first issue was illustrated by Royal A. Dunlap. The series was based on a short story written by Rivera titled IMBALANCE.

== Personal life ==
Rivera is openly gay.

== Publications ==
- Rivera, Gabby (2016). Juliet Takes a Breath (1 ed.). Bronx, New York: Riverdale Avenue Books. ISBN 978-1626012516.
- Rivera, Gabby; Quinones, Joe (2017). America Vol. 1: The Life and Times of America Chavez. New York City, New York: Marvel. ISBN 978-1302908812.
- Rivera, Gabby; Quinones, Joe; Wu, Annie (2018). America Vol. 2: Fast and Fuertona. New York City, New York: Marvel. ISBN 978-1302908829.
