= Andrew Gray (writer) =

- Born: 1968 (age 57–58); Glasgow, Scotland
- Occupations: Short story writer, novelist
- Writing career
- Period: 2001–present
- Genre: Fiction
- Notable work: Small Accidents
- Website: andrewneilgray.com

Andrew Neil Gray (born 1968) is a Scottish-born Canadian short story writer and novelist. In 2014, he was the Creative Writing Program Coordinator at the University of British Columbia, and founder and director of the university's low-residency Master of Fine Arts program.

== Early life and education ==
Born in Glasgow, Scotland, Gray moved with his family to Canada at the age of eight. While completing an MFA in creative writing from the University of British Columbia he served as executive editor of the periodical Prism. He graduated in 1996.

== Career ==
Gray's short story, "Heart of the Land", was included in The Journey Prize Anthology in 2000.

Gray published his first book of short stories, Small Accidents, in 2001. It contained stories in which medical emergencies lead to interesting life experiences, and was a finalist for the Ethel Wilson Fiction Prize in 2002. It was also shortlisted for an Independent Publisher Book Award in Fiction in 2003.

Gray edited the 2001 short story book, Write Turns: New Directions in Canadian Fiction, which was reviewed in the November 2001 issue of Quill & Quire.

By 2007, Gray was directing the low-residency program at UBC. He was an early adopter towards the use of the internet to promote writing. In 2011, he was interviewed as an expert for Lori May's book, The Low-Residency MFA Handbook: A Guide for Prospective Creative Writing Students.

In 2014, Gray was the program coordinator for the University of British Columbia Creative Writing Program. That year, he chaired Canada's Writing Conference, an annual national level gathering of writers.

== Works ==
- Small Accidents (2001)
- Andrew Gray, ed. (2001). Write Turns: New Directions in Canadian Fiction. Raincoast Books. ISBN 978-1-55192-402-1.
- The Ghost Line (July 11, 2017) (with J.S. Herbison). Tor.com. ISBN 978-0-76539-497-2.
