= Michigan Womyn's Music Festival =

Feminist music festival

- Genre: Women's music
- Dates: August
- Locations: Oceana County, Michigan
- Years active: 1976–2015
- Website: https://www.michfest.com (MWMF Archive)

The Michigan Womyn's Music Festival, often referred to as MWMF or Michfest, was a lesbian feminist women's music festival held annually from 1976 to 2015 in Oceana County, Michigan, on privately owned woodland northeast of Hart referred to as "The Land" by Michfest organizers and attendees. The event was built, staffed, run, and attended exclusively by women, with girls, young boys and toddlers permitted.

From 1991, the festival excluded trans women, adopting a "womyn-born womyn" policy, which drew increasing criticism. The festival was picketed by Camp Trans starting in the 1990s for its exclusionary policy. LGBTQ advocacy group Equality Michigan boycotted the event in 2014. Michfest drew criticism from the Human Rights Campaign, GLAAD, the National Center for Lesbian Rights, and the National LGBTQ Task Force, among others. The festival held its final event in August 2015.

== History ==
=== Background ===
The first women's music festivals in the United States were founded in the early 1970s, starting with day festivals at the Sacramento State and San Diego State University campuses, the Midwest Women's Festival in Missouri, the Boston Women's Music Festival, and the National Women's Music Festival at the University of Illinois at Urbana–Champaign. These first regional women-only events exposed audiences to feminist and openly lesbian artists, most of whom operated independently of the mainstream recording industry. Festival gatherings offered an alternative to urban bars, coffeehouses and protest marches, which were some of the few opportunities for lesbians to meet one another in the early 1970s. The feminist separatism of the spaces was a direct outgrowth of, and solidarity with, the activism created by black power and other racial solidarity movements.

=== 1970s ===
In 1976, Lisa Vogel, along with sister Kristie Vogel and friend Mary Kindig, founded the Michigan Womyn's Music Festival after attending an indoor festival of women's music in Boston the year before. They were joined by local businesswoman Susan Alborell. When their application to form a non-profit collective was denied, the We Want the Music Corporation was structured as the parent company of MWMF. Michfest was initially conceptualized as an event attended by women and feminist men; however, it became a women-only festival when the characteristics of outdoor camping were taken into consideration. MWMF was thereafter established as "an event for lesbians". Years later, author and feminist scholar Bonnie Morris would describe Michfest as "an entire city run by and for lesbian feminists. Utopia revealed. And Eden—built by Eves."

=== 1980s ===
In 1982, Michfest moved to what would become its long-term 650-acre location near Hart, Michigan. In subsequent years it would add an acoustic stage and an open mic stage, in addition to day stage and night stage programming. Cement-paved walkways were added to ease access for women with mobility challenges and baby strollers. Barbara "Boo" Price became Vogel's business partner after the 1985 festival and was increasingly involved with production until the two parted ways in 1994. A 10th-anniversary double album was produced in 1985, and in 1986, the festival expanded to five days. The festival was hampered by an outbreak of shigellosis in 1988. While the outbreak impacted over 3,000 women, the Festival's effective handling of the event was later studied by the Centers for Disease Control and Prevention.

=== 1990s and 2000s ===
In the 1990s, Michfest added a runway to the Night Stage and a mosh pit. Notable artists invited to the event during this era included the Indigo Girls and Tribe 8. Artists performing during these decades including Tracy Chapman, Sia, Ulali, Jane Siberry, The Five Lesbian Brothers, and Elvira Kurt.

=== Impact ===
The festival was renown for its centrality to lesbian culture creation and support. From its movie festival that screened lesbian films and shorts, to the hundreds of artists that performed there, to ground breaking lesbian theater. Further, the festival provided safe space for sexual freedom and dyke joy within a lived feminist vision of matriarchal, communal living, work and interconnected care. The festival was attended by women from around the globe.

Nudity was encouraged and practiced as an exercise in deconstructing patriarchal views of beauty and gender outside of the male gaze. The festival also nurtured and created a world of female independence that allowed for a lived experience of matriarchy.

The festival also existed in an embodied place of feminist praxis. Every decision was made with an anti-racist, classist, patriarchal lens, ageist, ableist lens, including a Womyn of Color tent within the festival that intentionally created space outside white cultural norms, accessible camping for disabled women, ASL interpretation for all performances and community meetings, as well as child and health care that was free to all seeking it. Tickets were sold on an as afforded basis and funds provided to those unable to pay full price.

==== Exclusion controversy ====
In 1991, trans woman Nancy Jean Burkholder was asked to leave the festival. This was retroactively justified by the instatement of a "womyn-born-womyn" policy, as named by Vogel. Vogel stated in 2013 that Michfest was intended for "womyn who at birth were deemed female". Although trans women regularly attended the festival, the focus of the festival as being for and about being raised female in patriarchy ("womyn-born-womyn") was perceived as exclusive and became the subject of increasing criticism.

In 1992, Burkholder had a survey circulated at Michfest that asked, "Do you think male-to-female transsexuals should be welcome at Michigan?" Although the sample was not "randomly selected", the results were interpreted as indicating that the greater number of those who attended MWMF would be against the exclusion of transsexual women, and "strongly suggest[ed] that the majority of Festigoers would support a 'no penis' policy that would allow postoperative male-to-female transsexuals" to attend Michfest. At the 2000 event, staff gave arrivals a sheet saying that the festival may deny "admission to individuals who self-declare as male-to-female transsexuals or female-to-male transsexuals now living as men (or [ask] them to leave if they enter)."

Critics argued that the womyn-born womyn intention constituted discrimination against transgender people and in 1995, Camp Trans, an annual protest event held concurrently with Michfest that operated adjacent to the festival venue, was launched.

In a 2005 interview with Amy Ray, Vogel defended the intention, stating that "having a space for women, who are born women, to come together for a week, is a healthy, whole, loving space to provide for women who have that experience. To label that as transphobic is, to me, as misplaced as saying the women-of-color tent is racist, or to say that a transsexual-only space, a gathering of folks of women who are born men is misogynist. I have always in my heart believed in the politics and the culture of separate time and space." In a 2006 press release, Vogel stated that "we strongly assert there is nothing transphobic with choosing to spend one week with womyn who were born as, and have lived their lives as, womyn."

Trans–bi activist Julia Serano, writing in 2007, criticized Michigan's policy as transmisogyny and pointed to a double standard: trans men were allowed at the festival, but trans women were not; in effect, this meant that trans men were treated as if they were women. She accused Michigan's policy of being inherently sexist against women and going against the very idea of a women's music festival, rebutted various statements put forth by Michfest in support of their policy, and described the preventing of pre-op trans women as phallocentric.

In 2013, transgender activist Red Durkin launched a Change.org petition asking performers to boycott Michfest until the womyn-born womyn intention was abolished. In response, Vogel stated that "I reject the assertion that creating a time and place for WBW to gather is inherently transphobic. This is a false dichotomy and one that prevents progress and understanding." Shortly after the petition was launched, the Indigo Girls announced that 2013 would be their last year at the festival while the intention was in place, releasing a statement that "we strongly feel that the time is long overdue for a change of intention, to one that states very plainly the inclusion of Trans Womyn." Another performer, Lovers, expressed their opposition to the intention but chose to perform in 2013 anyway. They released a statement arguing that "MWMF responds not to external, but internal pressure, and we believe that ultimately, the women who attend the festival are the ones who will decide its future."

In 2014, LGBT advocacy group Equality Michigan boycotted Michfest. The boycott was joined by the Human Rights Campaign (HRC), GLAAD, the National Center for Lesbian Rights (NCLR), and the National LGBTQ Task Force. Michfest accused the boycott of being "based on misrepresentations, purposeful omissions, and selective editing of prior Festival statements on this issue," with Vogel referring to the boycott as "McCarthy-era blacklist tactics". The NCLR and National LGBTQ Task Force would later withdraw their support for the boycott, as they felt it would not be "ultimately productive" in realizing its objective stating, "We have not abandoned our efforts to work for a fully inclusive Michfest. Our goal is a Michfest that fully welcomes Trans women."

Protests against the intention resulted in criticism of artists who had performed or been invited to Michfest. Bitch, of the band Bitch and Animal, attracted criticism for choosing to play at MWMF, resulting in the Boston Dyke March canceling an appearance by her in 2007, and she was also pulled or dis-invited from several other music festivals. Members of The Butchies and Le Tigre claimed to have been "verbally attacked, endlessly harassed and physically threatened" for deciding to play at the festival. In October 2013, filmmaker Sara St. Martin Lynne was asked to resign from the board of the Bay Area Girls Rock Camp for attending Michfest.

Supporters of the festival noted that the intention, context and history of the festival were being ignored to center trans women's experience without acknowledging the specificity of oppression female people face from birth because they are female, not because of their gender identity. As Vogel noted in an interview with After Ellen two years after the end of the festival:

Our intention of never questioning anyone’s gender on the Land stemmed from that, and that was in the 70s, before anyone was really discussing gender [identity]. it was really clear that here we were; we had this womyn-only space and womyn were getting confused – if they didn’t know butch womyn or bearded womyn or black womyn, then they were IDing sisters as men. And so really our original focus on this started out as: we don’t want here to be any place where a woman is questioned. Cuz we’re questioned about our womonhood all the time. I mean I’m a butch womon; I’ve been questioned. So that was the foundation of it.

And then as we rolled into the 80s, and the very beginning of the appearance of more trans folks in the community, then people would start to come up and say there’s a trans person on the land and we’d go, ‘look, we don’t question anybody about who they are. We would rather have everybody here than have a single womon be questioned.

In the late 70s early 80s, we came up with the term womyn-born-womyn. Our first kind of tag as a festival was, “A Gathering For Mothers and Daughters,” and that evolved into “A Gathering of Mothers and Daughters, for Womyn-Born-Womyn”. Since Michigan was around for a long time, you know the politics of everything shifted over those 40 years. We later clarified that: “womyn-born-womyn.” This is for womyn who were born and survived girlhood and still identified as womyn. And we always added that we leave the onus on each individual to respond to that as they will.

It was reported that transgender women attended the festival without revealing their status. This approach by the festival was criticized as equivalent to "Don't ask, don't tell" by Emily Dievendorf of Equality Michigan, Riki Wilchins of GenderPAC, and Julia Serano.

=== Closure in 2015 ===
Michfest celebrated its 40th anniversary in 2015. On April 21, Lisa Vogel announced via Facebook that it would also be the last festival. Vogel wrote in her statement:

There have been struggles; there is no doubt about that. This is part of our truth, but it is not — and never has been — our defining story. The Festival has been the crucible for nearly every critical cultural and political issue the lesbian feminist community has grappled with for four decades. Those struggles have been a beautiful part of our collective strength; they have never been a weakness.

== Operations ==
=== Activities and services ===
Attendance at the Michfest ranged from 3,000 to 10,000. Women built the stages, ran the lighting and sound systems, made trash collection rounds, served as electricians, mechanics, security, medical and psychological support, cooked meals for thousands over open fire pits, provided childcare, and facilitated workshops covering various topics of interest to the attendees, who were referred to as "festies". Up to one month was spent building the festival grounds, and dismantling them at the close of the event.

Management decisions were made through worker community meetings. Community service support included ASL interpretation at performances, mental and physical health care, Alcoholics Anonymous meetings, camping for disabled women, as well as a tent solely for women of color.

Writing from a personal perspective for The Village Voice in fall 1994, musician and Festival kitchen worker Gretchen Phillips (co-founder of the band Two Nice Girls) said: "I had never seen so many breasts before, so many bare asses, so much damn skin on such a vast terrain. I decided to make that weekend all about studying my body issues" and "I've always used Mich as a place to charge my batteries for the rest of the year, planning my life around being there in August and learning my lessons, both fun and hard."

Male children age four and under were allowed within the festival. Childcare for girls and boys under five was provided. A summer camp, Brother Sun Boys Camp, was available for boys aged 5 to 10.

=== Production and performances ===
Artists from multiple genres performed at Michfest, including classical, jazz, folk, hard rock, acoustic, bluegrass and gospel. The Festival created a high-tech production with three stages in a rural outdoor venue. Notable performers included Margie Adam, BETTY, Bitch, Tracy Chapman, Lea DeLaria, Melissa Ferrick, Mary Gauthier, Indigo Girls, Marga Gomez, Valerie June, Holly Near, Carole Pope, Vicki Randle, Jane Siberry, Jill Sobule, Cheryl Wheeler, Dar Williams, Cris Williamson, and Sam Bettens (formerly Sarah Bettens).

=== Michfest Half-Way Soirée ===
In 2005, festival attendee Lisa A. Snyder created the "Michfest Half-Way Soirée" in New York City to support the local Michigan Womyn's Music Festival community, female musicians, and women-owned businesses. Half-Way to Michfest Parties (sometimes also called Mid-Way Parties or Michfest Half-Way Parties) were subsequently held in many locations.

== Status of land property ==
In 2017, non-profit organization We Want the Land Coalition entered into a contract to purchase the land from Lisa Vogel. WWTLC intends to make the land accessible to women who want to organize events on it. Smaller events were planned for the summer of 2019. Fern Fest, an event resembling Michfest, though trans inclusive, was held in August 2022.

== See also ==
- Herstory
- Lesbian erasure
- Radical feminism
- Trans-exclusionary radical feminism
- Women's Week Provincetown
- Womyn
- Ruth Dworin, feminist activist who recorded Michfest for historical purposes
- Ruth Ellis, lesbian activist and staple of Michfest who became oldest known surviving "out" lesbian
- List of historic rock festivals
