= GenderPAC =

Former US LGBT rights organization

GenderPAC, also known as the Gender Public Advocacy Coalition, was an LGBT rights organization based in Washington, D.C., working to ensure that classrooms, communities, and workplaces were safe places for every person to learn, grow, and succeed, whether or not they conform to expectations for masculinity or femininity. It was active from 1995 to 2009.

== Activities ==
Generally considered the first national political organization devoted to issues of "gender identity and expression" and representing the transgender community, GenderPAC aimed to promote understanding of the connection between discrimination based on gender stereotypes and gender, sexual orientation, age, race and class. GenderPAC's major programs were Workplace Fairness, Gender Equality National Index for Universities & Schools (GENIUS) Congressional Diversity Pledge, GenderYOUTH Network, and the Children As They Are parenting network.

The organization argued that violence and discrimination based on gender variance was not limited to people who identified as trans. It was often categorised as a transgender-rights organization. GenderPAC's annual budget grew to $250,000 in its first five years of existence, and topped out at $1,200,000 when it ceased operations in 2009. Most of its revenue came from LGBT funders and also from corporate sponsorships, with small amounts from individual donor contributions and events.

== History ==
GenderPAC was founded in 1995 by Riki Wilchins as an association of existing transgender organizations, in response to a lack of inclusion of transgender and gender-variant issues by national gay and lesbian organizations, and grew quickly. Its areas of activism included incidents of discrimination against trans and gender-variant people, as well as youth and issues of workplace fairness. In 1996, the group began holding National Gender Lobby Days, during which activists would meet with members of Congress to discuss discrimination and violence. One part of these events was a Congressional Diversity Pledge, which asked Members of Congress to affirm that their own office would not discriminate against employees because of their "gender identity or expression." Signers included Jan Schakowsky, Jerrold Nadler, and Carolyn Maloney. Eventually almost 200 Members signed the Pledge, including two dozen Republicans and over a dozen Senators.

In 1997, GenderPAC produced The First National Study on Transviolence, a large research project on violence against transgender and gender-variant people. It was cited in the political struggle for hate crime protections for trans people. GenderPAC was a member of the Hate Crimes Coalition that effected in 1999 the introduction of the Hate Crimes Prevention Act, eventually passed in 2009. When the organization was founded, passing a trans-inclusive version of the Employment Non-Discrimination Act (ENDA) was a priority. After GenderPAC visited Congressional offices in preparation for a Lobby Days event, with an HRC lobbyist along, allegations were offered by some transgender activists that Human Rights Campaign might have persuaded GenderPAC to shift its support to hate crime laws, saying that this would be more politically efficacious. However, GenderPAC fervently denied this, and no actual evidence for the allegations was ever provided.

The organization formally organized in 1999, with a new board of directors comprising individuals instead of groups, and received tax-exempt status as a 501(c)(3) non-profit organization. GenderPAC held the first National Conference on Gender in 2001, coinciding with the sixth annual Gender Lobby Days; one speaker was NOW president Patricia Ireland. The June 2001 issue of Time named Wilchins one of 100 national innovators. In 2006, along with Global Rights, GenderPAC researched and published "50 Under 30: Masculinity and the War on America’s Youth". The first human rights report on fatal violence against gender-variant youth, "50 Under 30" documented an epidemic of violence that had claimed the lives of more than 50 young people aged 30 and under from 1996 to 2006. 82% were black or Latina/o, and virtually all were male-to-female transsexuals. Most were attacked by assailants within 5 to 10 years of their own age.

In 2008, with 17 new murders in just two years, the report was updated and reissued as "70 Under 30" help from the NYC Gay & Lesbian Anti-Violence Project, which eventually took over the project and integrated it into its annual hate crimes report. Over 100 national and local groups endorsed the findings of "50 Under 30," which was also adopted by members of the Hate Crimes Coalition on Capitol Hill, and provided by HRC to members of sub-committee that marked up the Mathew Shepherd Hate Crimes Act. The report was used by the House Hate Crimes Subcommittee, the federal-level activist Hate Crimes Coalition, the International Association of Police Chiefs, and the NYC Anti-Violence Project. On May 28, 2009, GenderPAC closed its doors and shut down its website, citing the number of other organizations now doing the work that it was originally created for. Its GenderYOUTH network and resources were transferred to Choice USA.

== Criticism ==
GenderPAC exemplified what certain feminists opposed about queer rights movements and certain elements of gender studies. For example, Sheila Jeffreys wrote that its aims ignored women in favor of "transgenders [sic], most of whom are men, and homosexuality", and that the organization's conception of gender as something that should be protected, and the basis for individuals rights that needed to be respected rather than eliminated, would serve to reinforce discrimination.

Conversely, other transgender rights organizations were angered by GenderPAC's rejection of the label of a transgender organization and to focus on trans issues. These latter criticized GenderPAC's reputed shift of focus away from a trans-inclusive ENDA at the supposed prompting of HRC, their unwillingness to engage with identity categories, and what they saw as a "violation" or exclusion of trans people through the use of their stories to raise money which was not spent primarily on trans issues.

GenderPAC's Board and constituency remained heavily transgender from its founding until it ceased operations. Wilchins proposed that the focus of a gender rights struggle to be about the issue of gender discrimination, rather than identity of transgender, which might leave out many of those who suffered discrimination. This view brought the organization to crisis when it took on the case of a self-identified "butch lesbian" who sought help after being repeatedly harassed at work and ultimately fired for allegedly looking "too masculine". Many on the Board said GenderPAC should only help transgender-identified individuals; others, including Wilchins, maintained that it was the issue of gender discrimination, rather than individual identity, that was paramount. It was a divide that GenderPAC struggled to bridge during its entire time in existence, and in many ways came to define the organization.

== See also ==
- LGBT rights in the United States
- List of LGBT rights organizations
