= Cecilia Tan =

American writer, editor, and sexuality activist

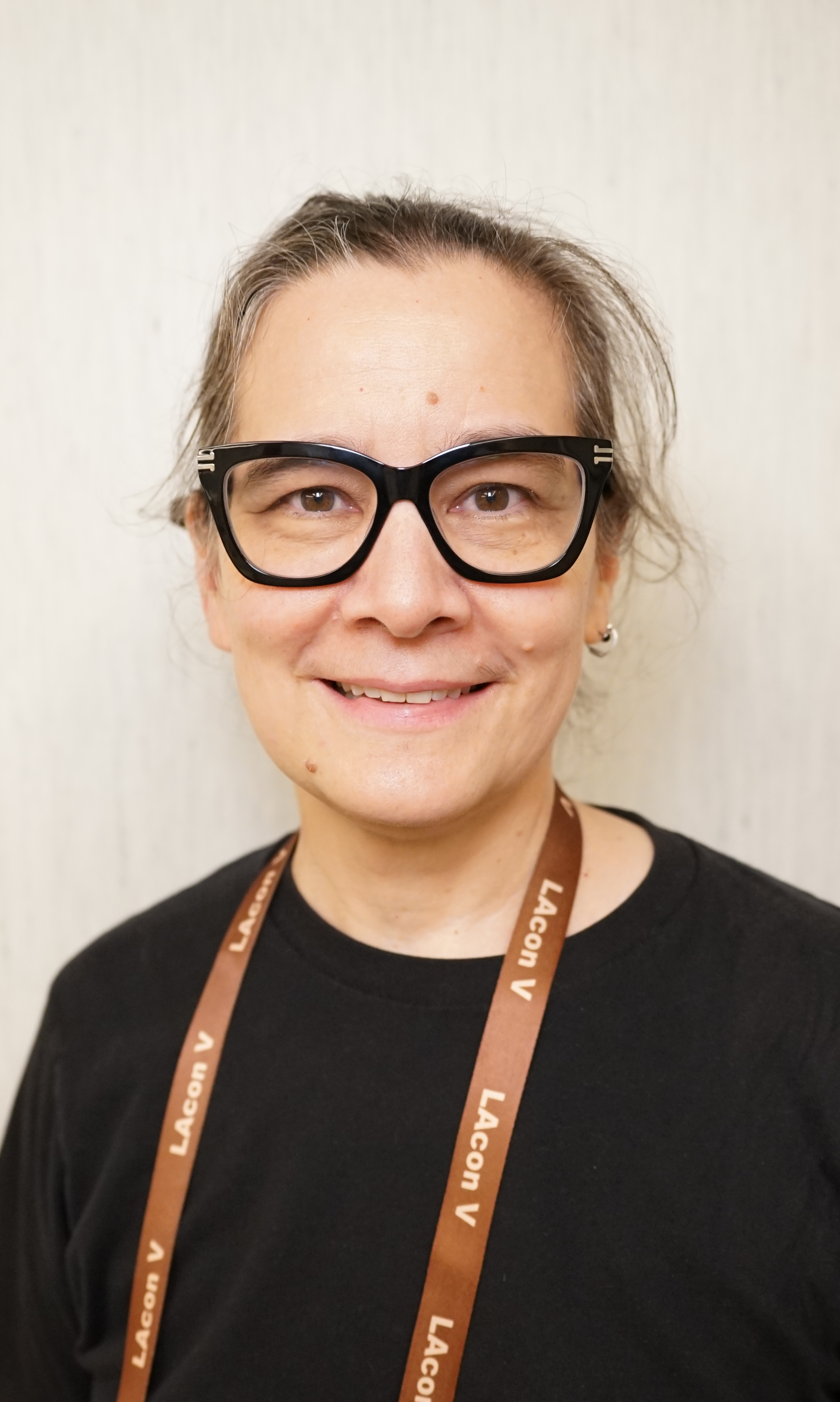
- Tan at Worldcon 2026
- Education: Brown University (BA)
- Occupations: Novelist; short story writer; sports writer; editor; sexuality activist; publisher

Cecilia Tan is an American writer, editor, sexuality activist, and founder and manager of Circlet Press, which specializes in science fiction erotica, a once uncommon genre; its publications often feature BDSM themes. She lives in Cambridge, Massachusetts.^{[1]} She also writes about baseball, but is not to be confused with a writer of the same name who specializes in Asian cookbooks.

== Life and career ==
Tan first wrote professionally as a teenager. She wrote a monthly column for Superteen magazine and also wrote features for Teen Machine, two popular teen titles published by the conglomerate Sterling's Magazines. Her aspiration was to be a science fiction writer, and she idolized Roger Zelazny, Marion Zimmer Bradley, and Ray Bradbury.^{[2]} She attended Brown University and received her BA in linguistics and cognitive science in 1989.^{[3]}

Shortly thereafter, she took a job at Beacon Press in Boston. At the same time, she discovered the leather community via the newsgroup alt.sex.bondage and the science fiction/fantasy fan community through conventions like Arisia and Gaylaxicon.^{[4]} She was one of a group of five people who began hosting BDSM play parties at science fiction conventions (known as "asb parties" after the newsgroup). The first one was at the July 1991 Gaylaxicon in Tewksbury, Massachusetts, followed soon after by a party at Philcon in November that drew hundreds of participants. Later, other fans took up the duties and Tan ceased hosting these parties.

Tan first published her erotic science fiction on alt.sex.bondage, posting stories and vignettes with some regularity in 1991 and 1992.

By 1992 she decided to leave her job at Beacon Press to pursue a master's degree in writing at Emerson College. On her final day of work at Beacon, she returned home to find her first acceptance letter for the publication of a story waiting in her mailbox. It was for the story "A True Story", which was accepted into the anthology Herotica 4, edited by Susie Bright.

Tan played baseball in a women's league in Pawtucket, Rhode Island, known as the Pawtucket Slaterettes, but retired after the 2007 season.^{[10]} She holds a black belt in tae kwon do, receiving her second degree (dan) in June 2009, and is a certified technician in Okazaki Restorative Massage.^{[11]}

She was also a longtime BDSM/leather community activist, joining NLA: New England in 1991, founding the Fetish Fair Fleamarket in 1992 and going on to direct almost 50 Fetish Fair Fleamarket events throughout New England (Boston, Providence, and other cities) as well as those in Houston, Atlanta, and Charlotte, NC. She served on the board of the New England Leather Alliance (NELA), and was given the Woman Of The Year Award from the National Leather Association International in 2001, and the Lifetime Achievement Award from the National Leather Association International in 2004. She was also awarded the Pantheon of Leather President's Award in 2009. She retired from formal involvement with BDSM community activism in 2013, citing health reasons, but continues to speak, teach workshops and classes, and appear at BDSM and leather/fetish events as a writer and educator.

She has described herself as a “Chinese-filipino Irish Welsh bisexual”, and as living a polyamorous lifestyle.

== Circlet Press ==
While in graduate school, Tan remained in publishing with her own small press, Circlet Press, Inc. Circlet's first book was a chapbook of Tan's erotic science fiction stories, entitled Telepaths Don't Need Safewords. Mate by Lauren P. Burka soon followed, as did a host of small anthologies like SexMagick, TechnoSex, and Worlds of Women. Tan received her master's degree in professional writing and publishing in 1994 from Emerson and devoted herself to writing and running Circlet Press full-time thereafter.^{[6]}

By June 2009, Circlet Press had published over fifty titles, most of them erotic science fiction with occasional forays into related genres.^{[7]} Circlet branched into digital publishing in 2008, and released nearly 100 ebook titles between 2008 and the end of 2013. As editorial director of Circlet Press, Tan was the creator of the press's later imprints, Clasp Editions to publish sf/f erotic romance, and Gressive Press, for exploring sexuality outside the "big binaries" (gay/straight, male/female) with themes of bisexuality, transgender issues, and other sexualities not easily labeled.

== Publishing history ==
Tan herself has had her work published in a variety of outlets. Her stories have appeared in Ms. Magazine, Penthouse, Asimov's Science Fiction, Absolute Magnitude, Best American Erotica, Best Lesbian Erotica, Nerve.com, and many, many other places. Her collection of short stories, Black Feathers, appeared in 1998 from HarperCollins. A follow-up collection of erotic short stories, White Flames, was published in 2008 by Running Press. Tan moved into writing erotic romance ebooks in 2009 with the publications of Mind Games and The Hot Streak from Ravenous Romance. Her erotic romance novel series known as the Magic University series was published in ebook form by Ravenous Romance and in trade paperback by Red Silk Editions, an imprint of Red Wheel Weiser. (Weiser killed the imprint after the demise of the Borders bookstore chain and so only two of the four books in the series appeared in Red Silk Editions.) The Magic University series was published in French.

In 2013, her first BDSM romance novel from a major publisher appeared. Slow Surrender, published by Hachette/Grand Central Publishing, was the first of a trilogy in the newly created romance category of "BDSM billionaire" (created by the publishing industry in the wake of the runaway success of 50 Shades of Grey by E.L. James). The book was nominated for Book of the Year in the erotic category by RT Book Reviews, and Tan herself was nominated by RT for the Lifetime Achievement Award in Erotica.^{[12]} The Struck by Lightning trilogy, including Slow Surrender, was also published in France by Hachette Livre. Another romance trilogy published by Hachette/Grand Central Publishing soon followed, the Secrets of a Rock Star series, which was later published in Germany by Bastei Luebbe.

Her baseball works include The 50 Greatest Yankee Games (Wiley, 2005) and The 50 Greatest Red Sox Games (Wiley, 2006, co-authored with Bill Nowlin). She wrote weekly columns for GothamBaseball.com and YankeesXtreme.com and occasional articles for Yankees Magazine, and she continues to produce the online baseball magazine Why I Like Baseball. In 2004 she won an award for baseball research at the national SABR Convention, the USA Today Sports Weekly award for best poster presentation for her work entitled, "The Women's Baseball Marathon". She has been editing the Maple Street Press Yankees Annual since 2007. In 2011, Tan became the publications director for the Society for American Baseball Research, as well as co-editor of the Baseball Prospectus Annual with King Kaufman. She and Kaufman presided over the BP annual for two years in the transition from former in-house editor Steven Goldman to the in-house editing team of Sam Miller and Jason Wojchechowski.^{[9]} In 2011 she became the Publications Director for SABR (Society for American Baseball Research), and in 2022 became the longest-tenured editor in that role in SABR's history.

== Honors and awards ==
Tan has been the recipient of various literary and publishing industry awards. In 2010, she was inducted into the Hall of Fame for GLBTQ writers at the Saints & Sinners Literary Festival. That same year her online serial, Daron's Guitar Chronicles, won the inaugural Rose and Bay Award for Crowdfunded Fiction. Her novel The Prince's Boy was awarded Honorable Mention in both the 2010 Rainbow Awards and the NLA: International Writing Awards.^{[13]}^{[14]} Her novel Slow Surrender won the RT Reviewers Choice Award in the erotic romance category from RT Book Reviews and the Maggie Award for Excellence given by the Georgia Romance Writers chapter of the Romance Writers of America. Tan was awarded the RT Book Reviews 2014 Lifetime Achievement Award in Erotica. As of 2014, her books have been multiply nominated for the Lambda Literary Award, though she has not yet won one.^{[8]} Circlet Press, the publishing house Tan founded and still directs, was co-winner of Bi Book Publisher of the Year at the 2014 Bisexual Book Awards.

Tan was given the Woman Of The Year Award from the National Leather Association International in 2001, and the Lifetime Achievement Award from the National Leather Association International in 2004. She also received the President's Award as part of the Pantheon of Leather Awards in 2009. She and Sarah Desautels received the National Leather Association International’s Samois Anthology Award for 2010 for their anthology Like a Thorn.

Her baseball writing and research has also earned awards. In 2004, her research presentation on "The Women's Baseball Marathon" won the USA Today Sports Weekly Award. In 2022 she was co-winner of the Tweed Webb Lifetime Achievement Award with Sean Forman for editing The Negro Leagues are Major Leagues.

== See also ==
- Sex and sexuality in speculative fiction
