= Blowfish (company) =

Sex toy catalog and company

Blowfish was an online sex toy catalog offering erotic toys, books, supplies and videos.

== History ==
Founded May 1, 1994, The Blowfish Corporation was one of the first online sex toy catalogs. With the motto "Good Products for Great Sex", Blowfish is known for their honest, thorough and often humorous reviews of their products.

Blowfish is also, according to the San Francisco Bay Guardian, known for carrying a number of "sex toys as art forms," often fashioned out of glass.

In 2003 Blowfish created Blowfish Video with their release of Clearly Sex, a video highlighting handmade acrylic sex toys created by local artist Cate Cox.

In 2005 Blowfish Video teamed up with Pink and White Productions and produced The Crash Pad, the first video directed by Shine Louise Houston. The Crash Pad was well received and lauded for featuring realistic lesbian sex. Later that year, The Crash Pad went on to win the 2005 Feminist Porn Award for Hottest Dyke Sex Scene.

In 2006 Blowfish Video and Pink and White Productions produced Shine's second hit, Superfreak (named after the 1981 hit single "Super Freak" produced and performed by Rick James, the movie features the ghost of the funk star coming back and creating sexy mischief at an all-girl party), which won the 2007 Feminist Porn Award for Best Dyke Scene.

In 2007 Blowfish Video and Pink and White Productions produced Shine's third hit, In Search of the Wild Kingdom, a pomo-porno-mockumentary which won the 2007 Feminist Porn Award for Best Trans Sex Scene.

On June 21, 2007 the company was named one of seven organizations to attain a ranking in About.com's "Sex Shop Hall of Fame."

In 2008 Bondage Boob Tube, a movie directed by Madison Young and produced by Blowfish Video, won the Feminist Porn Award for Hottest Kink Film.
