= Mountain Moving Coffeehouse =

Lesbian feminist music venue

Mountain Moving Coffeehouse for Womyn and Children
- Successor: Kindred Hearts' Coffeehouse
- Formation: 1974
- Dissolved: December 10, 2005
- Type: Coffeehouse
- Legal status: Collective
- Purpose: Womyn's music and culture
- Location(s): 1700 W. Farragut; Chicago, Illinois; United States
- Coordinates: 41°58′38.37″N 87°40′20.28″W
- Region served: Chicago

The Mountain Moving Coffeehouse for Womyn and Children was a lesbian feminist music venue, located in Chicago and known across the United States. It operated for thirty-one years, from 1974 until 2005. The name of the organization evokes the political task that feminists must "move the mountains" of institutional sexism and homophobia. The alternative spelling of "womyn" represented an expression of female independence and a repudiation of traditions that define women by reference to a male norm.

The "coffeehouse" was a once-a-week Saturday night gathering, held at a rented space in churches, in various north side Chicago neighborhoods, that presented woman-identified music and entertainment by and for lesbians and feminists. Drug and alcohol-free, the space was intended as an alternative to the lesbian bar scene. The organization was founded by lesbian-feminist activists as a safe-space for cisgender women and their young children. Male children over the age of two and transgender women were not allowed to attend.

The womyn-born womyn policy generated some controversy during the 1980s when pressure was put on the coffeehouse to allow admittance to men, as well as in the 1990s when the policy was contested by transgender women. It was claimed that the policy was discriminatory and created "mental difficulties" for transgender women. The policy was also challenged in the 1990s by a local gay male journalist. However, the organization defended its policy and never allowed admittance to men or to transgender women.

In 1993, the coffeehouse was inducted into the Chicago Gay and Lesbian Hall of Fame.

Upon the closure of the coffeehouse on December 10, 2005, it was the oldest continuously operating womyn-born womyn and girl-only concert venue in the United States. A successor organization was created called the Kindred Hearts' Coffeehouse, which serves as a monthly event offering women's music.
