= Cacography =

Deliberate misspelling for comic effect

Cacography is bad spelling or bad handwriting. The term in the sense of "poor spelling, accentuation, and punctuation" is a semantic antonym to orthography, and in the sense of "poor handwriting" it is an etymological antonym to the word calligraphy: cacography is from Greek κακός (kakos "bad") and γραφή (graphe "writing").

Cacography is also deliberate comic misspelling, a type of humour similar to malapropism.

A common usage of cacography is to caricature illiterate speakers, as with eye dialect spelling. Others include the use to indicate that something was written by a child, to indirectly voice a cute or funny animal in a meme such as the captioned photo of a British Shorthair that was the namesake of I Can Has Cheezburger?, or because the misspelling bears a humorous resemblance to a completely unrelated word.

== See also ==
- Satirical misspelling
- Sensational spelling
- Catachresis
- Gaffe
- Corruption (linguistics)
- Eye dialect
- Teh
- Lolcat
- Tiopês
