= Intentional misspelling =

Intentional misspelling may refer to:

- Sensational spelling
- Satiric misspelling
