= Womyn's land =

Intentional community organised by lesbian separatists

Womyn's land is an intentional community organised by lesbian separatists to establish counter-cultural, women-centred space, without the presence of men. These lands were the result of a social movement of the same name that developed in the 1970s in the United States, Australia, New Zealand, and western Europe. Many still exist today. Womyn's land-based communities and residents are loosely networked through social media; print publications such as newsletters; Maize: A Lesbian Country Magazine; Lesbian Natural Resources, a not-for-profit organisation that offers grants and resources; and regional and local gatherings.

Womyn's lands practice various forms of lesbian separatism, an idea which emerged as a result of the radical feminist movement in the late 1960s. Lesbian separatism is based on the idea that women must exist separately from men, socially and politically, in order to achieve the goals of feminism. These separatist communities exist as a way for women to achieve female liberation by separating themselves from mainstream patriarchal society. Men are not allowed to live in these communities, but a few lands allow men to visit. Some communities ban male infants and/or male relatives.

Womyn's lands have generated a wide range of criticisms, most of which centre around the lack of acceptance by many residents of bisexual and heterosexual women; the exclusion of transgender women; ideological conflicts with local communities that include violence and threats of violence targeting residents of womyn's lands; and local community concerns about expanded lesbian visibility. However, despite the grumbling of longstanding members, some communities, such as HOWL, have welcomed trans and non-binary individuals.

Examples of existing womyn's lands include Hawk Hill Community Land Trust and Sugar Loaf Women's Village. As their founders age, these communities are facing decline, and they struggle to connect with younger generations of women.

== Terminology ==
Feminist separatists have used a variety of alternative spellings for women, most notably womyn. The first instance of the word "womyn" appearing in print media was an announcement in a 1975 issue of Lesbian Connection. Separatist intentional communities have been referred to using these alternative spellings, and other terms, like womyn's land, lesbian land, wimmin's land, landdyke communities, or women's land. The associated social movement has similarly been called the womyn's land movement, lesbian land movement, landdyke or landyke movement, and women's land movement. Open women's land refers to lands that are open to any female for visiting, staying, or building homes.

== Historical precedent ==
=== Sanctificationists a.k.a. Woman's Commonwealth ===
A precursor to womyn's land and the womyn's land movement in the United States is the Sanctificationists, or Woman's Commonwealth, which was established in Texas in the late 1870s. A brief article published in the lesbian separatist periodical, Austindyke (alternately spelled as Austin Dyke), in 1979 and then reprinted in Sisters United in 1980 described the Woman's Commonwealth as a forerunner of the lesbian land movement. It is unclear whether the Sanctificationists influenced the movement that flourished in the 1970s and 1980s.

Founded in the late 1870s to early 1880s, the Sanctificationists, later known as the Woman's Commonwealth, were a women's land-based commune first established in Belton, Texas. The community was originally established by Martha McWhirter and her women's bible study group on land that was inherited when the women's husbands died or quit the home. Residents of the commune were women and their dependent children; many of the women fled abusive homes to join the community. The Sisters embraced first wave feminist ideologies, and sought spiritual, economic, and social equality for women. To that end, they practised celibacy as a way to liberate women from the spiritual degradation of heterosexual intercourse, the oppressive needs of children and child rearing, and male violence. The Sanctificationists were economically successful; they ran several boarding houses, two hotels, formed holding companies to manage their properties, and operated two farms to provide food for their multiple dining rooms. At one point, there were between 42 and 50 women members on record, including at least one African-American woman who is thought to be a former slave. In the 1880s, the citizens of Belton blamed the Sanctificationists for rising separation and divorce rates, and of undermining the meaning of marriage through their practice of celibacy. In 1899, the entire commune moved to Washington, DC, where they opened boarding houses, a hotel, and participated in urban feminist organisations. McWhirter died in 1904, and the commune began a slow decline. In 1917, there were six remaining members who purchased a farm in rural Maryland to provide food for their urban dining halls, and to provide a pastoral retreat for themselves in a rural landscape. The last member of the commune died in 1983 at the age of 101.

== Theory ==
=== Radical feminism ===
Radical feminism advocates for the elimination of female oppression through social and political transformation of patriarchal society. The idea of female oppression rather than discrimination on the basis of sex came in part due to Simone De Beauvoir's work The Second Sex. It was the belief of radical feminists that the study of the oppression could aid in its dismantling.

Radical feminism grew out of other radical movements during the 1960s such as the Anti-War Movement. Women who took part in these radical movements felt under-represented in comparison to the men, which contributed to the formation of second-wave feminism and radical feminism.

Radical feminist ideology is different from mainstream or liberal feminism because it believes that women's liberation can only be achieved through the re-ordering of patriarchal society, while mainstream/liberal feminism seeks equality within the existing system. Radical feminism also focuses on sex as the root of female oppression, as opposed to social class and/or race. Radical feminist groups and organisations include Cell 16, Redstockings, The Radical Feminists #28 and The Furies Collective.

=== Lesbian separatism and separatist spaces ===
Lesbian separatism is rooted in the idea that women should and must exist separately from men in order to transform patriarchal society. Lesbian separatist ideology has changed over time as the Radical Feminist Movement continued in its development. In the earlier stages of lesbian separatism the term lesbian separatist was considered synonymous to the term radical feminist. However, as each group developed distinct ideologies, tension formed between radical feminists and lesbian separatists. Lesbian separatists used the separatist ideology as a way to "test one's feminist commitment," which resulted in a divide.

An increase in lesbian feminism essays and papers centred around the subject of lesbian separatism, influenced and shaped lesbian separatist ideology as well. Influential works which helped shape lesbian separatism included Lesbian Separatism: Amazon Analysis, the Collective Lesbian International Terrorists Papers, and Cell 16's No More Fun and Games: A Journal of Female Liberation.

Lesbian separatism is not only practised and utilised in communal areas such as womyn's lands; it is also practised in separatist events and women-only spaces. One example of a feminist separatist event (the invited participants were womyn-born womyn, girls of all ages, boys 10 and under) is the Michigan Womyn's Music Festival. This music festival was held in Michigan every year from 1976 to 2015. It was created by women for the purpose of establishing an annual safe, social space dedicated for lesbians and women alike. The Michigan Womyn's Music Festival embraced a separatist ideology by not permitting men, male children, or trans women to participate in the festival.

=== Significance to feminist thought and woman-based communities ===
Feminist ideology maintains that the patriarchal institutions and social norms which make up society are the source of female oppression. Lesbian separatist ideology recognises the oppression which results from patriarchal society, however, it asserts that the root of oppression derives from men themselves, individually and as a group. Unlike feminism, lesbian separatism views men as the main source of their oppression. Through this ideology, many lesbian separatists consider men as the sole perpetrators of adverse economic, societal, and cultural issues which affect them. As a result, lesbian separatists sought to construct autonomous womyn's land communities where they could live segregated from men entirely.

== Criticisms ==
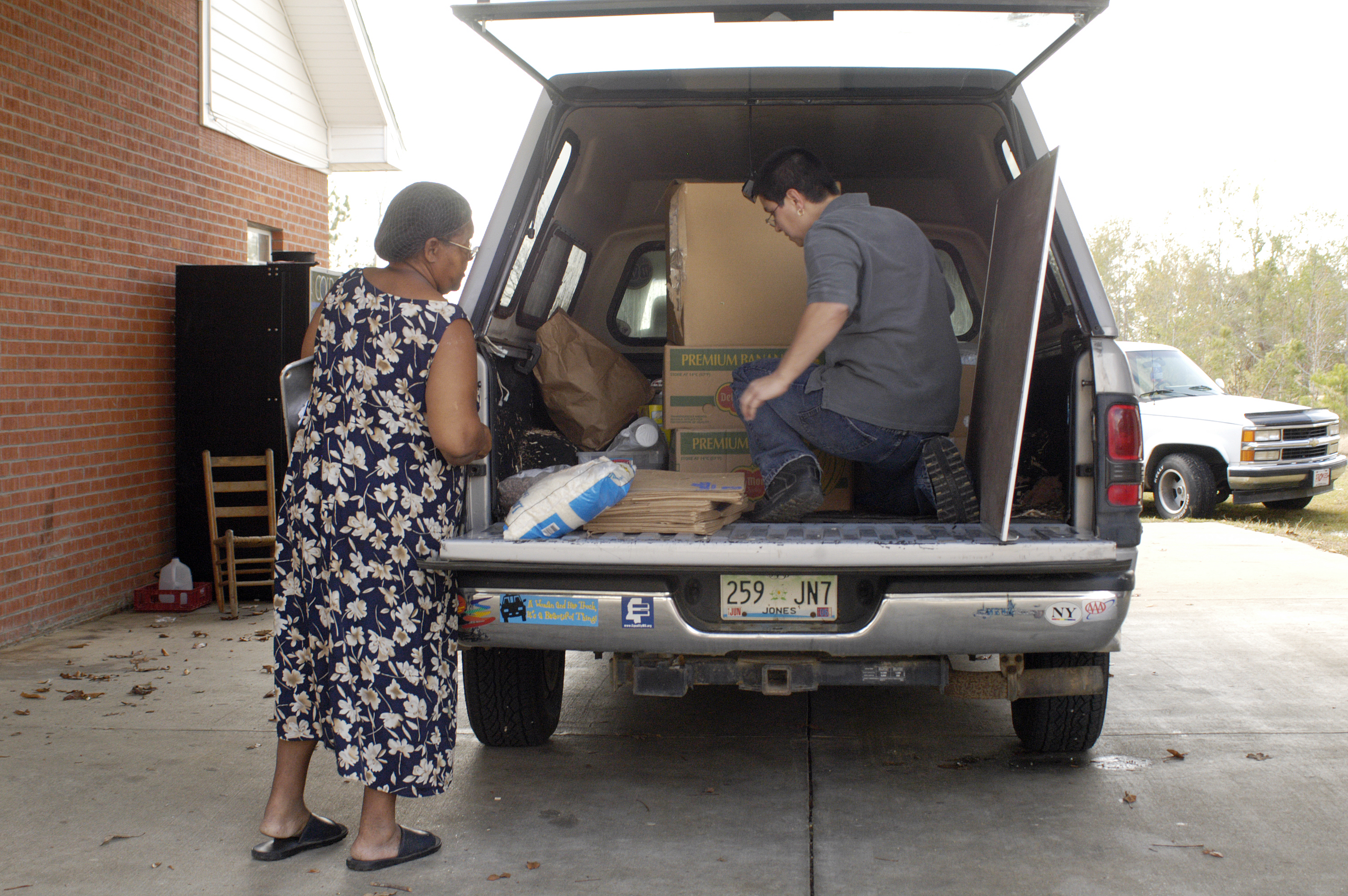
Residents of Camp Sister Spirit were active in their local community, donating food, clothing, and other supplies.

Cisgender lesbians are usually the only persons permitted to be members of most womyn's lands. This policy has been criticised for excluding bisexual, heterosexual, and transgender women. In the past, some womyn's lands were criticised for excluding women of color and working class lesbians; and lesbian separatist communities were also accused of being a privilege offered solely to the few who could afford the closed-off lifestyle.

=== Michigan Womyn's Music Festival ===
The Michigan Womyn's Music Festival was an annual women's music festival held on 650 acres (260 ha) of privately owned land near Hart, Michigan. Founded in 1976 by Lisa Vogel, Kristie Vogel and Mary Kindig, MichFest ran for 40 years until 2015. Controversy over the festival's intention permitting only womyn-born womyn (excluding transgender women) volunteers and attendees at the event began in 1991 and continued until the final gathering. Critics of the festival's viewpoint included actress/comedian Lea DeLaria, musicians the Indigo Girls and Antigone Rising, and poet Andrea Gibson. Trans activist/comedian Red Durkin created a boycott petition against MWMF on Change.org in 2013.

=== Camp Sister Spirit ===
Camp Sister Spirit, located in southern Mississippi in the town of Ovett, was a 120-acre (49 ha) feminist retreat founded by lesbian couple Brenda and Wanda Henson in July 1993. Soon after work on the property had begun, the camp was criticized by many local residents and community leaders, including Southern Baptist ministers, Jones County Deputy Sheriff Myron Holifield, and US Representative Michael Parker, who held well-attended town hall meetings and a fundraiser to raise money to force the camp to close. The Reverend John S. Allen, who was a pastor in Richton, a town close to Ovett, preached and wrote against Camp Sister Spirit citing biblical concerns about homosexuality. Residents of the land received bomb threats, hate mail, vandalism, death threats by phone, and other acts of terrorism. Local law enforcement officials downplayed the threats against Camp Sister Spirit and failed to adequately investigate.

In 1994, then Attorney General Janet Reno asked the Federal Bureau of Investigation (FBI) to investigate the potential for violence against Camp Sister Spirit, and later sent federal mediators to attempt resolution. The opponents of Camp Sister Spirit refused to participate in mediation; a group filed one lawsuit against Reno, and another against Camp Sister Spirit. The conflict also appeared on talk shows and in a Congressional hearing with both sides arguing their different views.

Brenda Henson died in 2008 and Camp Sister Spirit closed two years later.

== Communities ==
=== Australia ===
In 1974, Amazon Acres was founded near Wauchope, New South Wales. In 1980 and 1982, several women from Amazon Acres founded Herland and The Valley/Vallee.

=== United States ===
==== Southern Oregon ====
There were at least 39 communities in southern Oregon—mainly in Douglas and Josephine county—between 1972 and 1995. Shelley Grosjean considers Rootworks, Cabbage Lane, WomanShare, Golden, Fly Away Home, OWL Farm, Rainbow's End, Groundworks, WHO Farm, and Copperland as key womyn's land communities in southern Oregon. Because many of the womyn's lands in southern Oregon have been close to I-5, the section of the interstate between Eugene and the California border has been called the "Amazon Trail."

===== Oregon Women's Land Trust =====
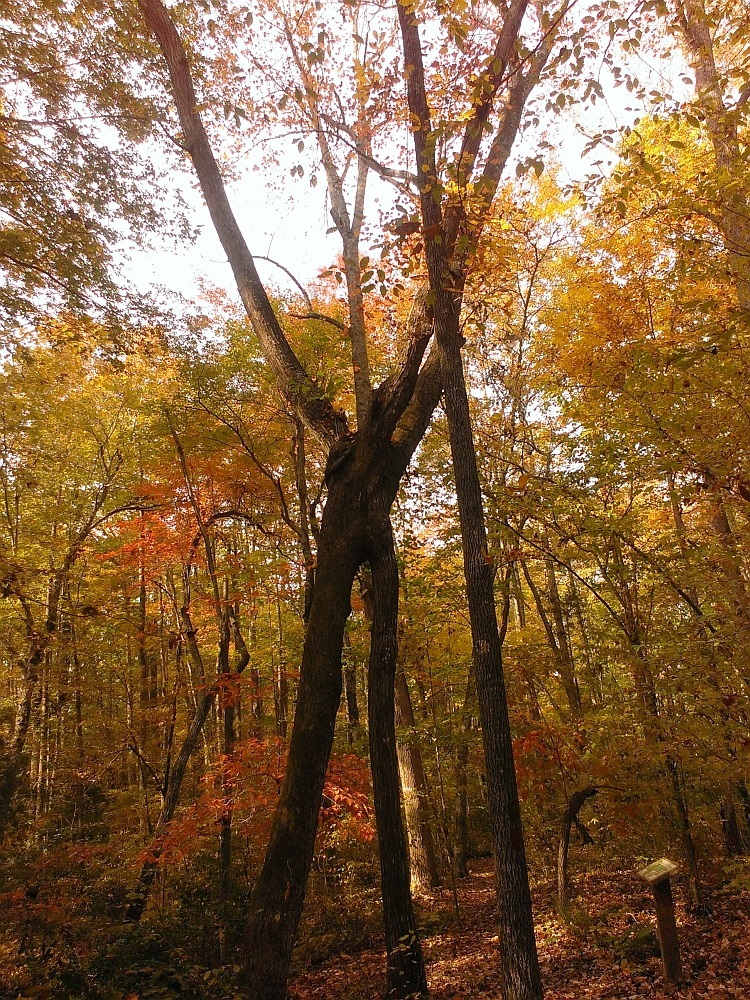
Conjoined trees at Bold Moon Farm in rural Guilford County, North Carolina

The Oregon Women's Land Trust was founded in 1975 and owns 147 acres (59 ha) of land in Douglas County, referred to as OWL Farm. Initial conversations about the idea of an open womyn's land arose from a WomanShare conference about money and power. Members of surrounding womyn's lands wanted a place where economically disadvantaged women could stay with other women without the need for permanent residence or invitation. They wanted to establish a land trust that was accessible to women and children regardless of their financial status. The land would be held in perpetuity and in its initial form would be open for any women to come live on. Open Land Trust meetings were held in 1975 and 1976. Women collectively contributed money to buy the land together, giving anywhere between $25–5000. In the spring of 1976, a 147-acre piece of land was found in southern Oregon. Over 100 women attended the first meeting that took place at OWL Farm. Soon after this meeting, sixteen women met to form the caretaker collective and moved on to the land in July 1976. Over time the community reorganised financially into a federally recognised 501(c)(3) organization.

As with many back to the land and intentional communities, the community at OWL farm faced challenges related to philosophical and political differences as well as interpersonal issues. These are documented in a number of writings by women who lived in the community. In 1987, a resident caretaker remained and OWL Trust began hosting conferences and other events on the farm. The land continued to provide residential space but was no longer run as a collective. In 1999 the policy that had allowed any woman to live there without any prior vetting or approval was changed to create a more stable and sustainable living environment.

As of 2018 the Trust has an active board and has had resident caretakers for most years since it ceased being a residential community. Infrastructure improvements continue with maintenance of buildings, water system improvements and restoration of the farm's original pond. As well as preserving and maintaining OWL Farm, the Trust runs educational and wildland access programming in the areas of ecological land management, organic gardening, permaculture and out-door skills. Regular hikes and gatherings are offered at OWL Farm. The farm is also the last resting place of women members who have requested natural burial or interment of ashes.

==== HOWL ====
The Huntington Open Women's Land (HOWL) was established in 1989 on 50 acres of land in Huntington, Vermont.

==== Maat Dompim Womyn of Color Land Project ====
Amoja ThreeRivers and Blanche Jackson created Maat Dompim, the Womyn of Color Land Project in 1992. It was structured to be a retreat and conference center, where women could stay for short periods of time. ThreeRivers and Jackson spent seven years raising money and in 1999, they bought 109 acres (44 ha) of land in Buckingham County, Virginia. Many women expressed interest in the project but few came to help develop the land. As of 2015, no one lives on the property.

== Lists of womyn's lands ==
=== Active communities ===
- Adobeland (1978, Arizona, USA)
- Alapine Village (1997, Alabama, USA)
- Belly Acres (1975, Tennessee, USA)
- Cabbage Lane Land Trust (1974, Oregon, USA)
- Daughters of the Earth/DOE (1976, Wisconsin, USA)
- Dragon/DW Outpost (1974, Missouri, USA)
- Fly Away Home (1976, Oregon, USA)
- Hawk Hill Community Land Trust (1989, Missouri, USA)
- HOWL (1989, Vermont, USA)
- Maat Dompim Womyn of Color Land Project (1999, Virginia, USA)
- New Mexico Women's Retreat (c.1980, New Mexico, USA)
- The North Forty/Long Leaf (1972, Florida, USA)
- Oregon Women's Land Trust (1976, Oregon, USA)
- Ozark Land Holding Association/OLHA (1981, Arkansas, USA)
- Pagoda (1977, Florida, USA)
- Rainbow's End (1975, Oregon, USA)
- Raven Song/Rainbow's Other End (1979, Oregon, USA)
- Rootworks (1975, Oregon, USA)
- Steppingwoods (1975, Oregon, USA)
- Sugarloaf Women's Village (1976, Florida, USA)
- We'moon Land/We'Moon Healing Ground/WHO Farm (1973, Oregon, USA)
- Whispering Oaks (Oregon, USA)
- WomanShare (1973, Oregon, USA) (called NativeWomanshare since 2023)

=== Former separatist communities ===
- Arco Iris (1977–present, Arkansas)
- Susan B. Anthony Memorial Unrest Home Womyn's Land Trust (SuBAMUH) (1979–present, Ohio)

=== Defunct communities ===
Womyn's land groups that cease to exist have had their property absorbed by conservation groups and other land trusts, or sold. Others have changed their structure from womyn's lands to non-separatist intentional communities or land trusts.

- A Woman's Place (1974–1982, New York)
- Bold Moon Farm (1985–2010, North Carolina)
- Camp Pleiades (1995–2005)
- Camp Sister Spirit (1993–2011, Mississippi)
- Cloudland (1990–1992)
- Full Moon Farm (1996–2000)
- Gathering Root (1985–2011)
- Greenhope (1983–?, Vermont)
- Kvindelandet (1978–1983, Denmark)
- Sassafras (1976–1980, Arkansas)
- Something Special (1987–2011)
- Supportive Healing Environment of Long-Living Lesbians/SHELL (1999–2001)
- Turtleland (1978–1985)
- Yellowhammer (1974–?, Arkansas)
- Whypperwillow/Whippoorwillow (1981–1987, Arkansas)

== In media ==
=== Fiction ===
Several novels have been published in English that are inspired by womyn's lands. These include:

- The Female Man (1975) and "When It Changed" (1972) by Joanna Russ
- Woman on the Edge of Time (1976) by Marge Piercy
- Walk to the End of the World (1974) and Motherlines (1978) by Suzy McKee Charnas
- The Demeter Flower (1980) by Rochelle Singer (a.k.a. Shelley Singer)
- Daughters of a Coral Dawn (1984) by Katherine D. Forrest
- Ammonite (1992) by Nicola Griffith

=== Non-fiction ===
- Hawk Madrone's memoir Weeding at Dawn: A Lesbian Country Life (2000) details her time living at Fly Away Home in southern Oregon.
- Myriam Fougère's 2012 film Lesbiana: A Parallel Revolution documents the history of lesbian separatism, lesbian lands, and lesbian culture in the United States and Canada. It includes artists, activists, and other women who live or have lived on womyn's lands, attended women's music festivals, or participated in other aspects of lesbian culture. The film features many lesbian feminists, such as Gloria Escomel, Nicole Brossard, Alix Dobkin, Marilyn Frye, Carolyn Gage, Sonia Johnson, Evelyn Torton Beck, Sarah Hoagland, and Julia Penelope.
- Amazon Acres, You Beauty: Stories of Women's Lands, Australia (2017) is a collection of women's stories curated by Sand Hall about the Australian womyn's land Amazon Acres.
- Wild Mares: My Lesbian Back-to-the-Land Life (2018) by Dianna Hunter documents the author's experiences on a womyn's land in Wisconsin.
- A Woman's Place: A Feminist Collective in the Adirondacks (2020) by Lorraine Duvall chronicles the history of A Woman's Place, a womyn's land that was within the Adirondack Park in Athol, New York.

== See also ==
- Back to the Land Movement
- Herstory
- June L. Mazer Lesbian Archives
- Lesbian Connection
- Lesbian Herstory Archives
- Lesbophobia
- Political lesbianism
- Radical lesbians
