= Modern Métis Woman =

Canadian registered charity

- Founded: 2017
- Founder: Carleigh Milburn
- Type: Registered Charity
- Region served: Canada
- Services: Yearly Scholarships
- Website: modernmetiswoman.com

Modern Métis Woman is a Canadian, non-profit, registered charity which provides scholarships to Métis identifying women. The NGO was established in 2017 by Queens University PhD candidate Carleigh Milburn for "womxn" who self-identify as Métis.

The non-profit acknowledges the LGBTQ+ community. The NGO provides Métis women with post-secondary scholarships, and digital spaces for art publications.

== Art publication ==
Modern Métis Woman hosts digital platforms to represent Indigenous and non-Indigenous artwork. All artwork that is submitted is used for publication and distribution with copyright ownership remaining with the artist. The charity utilizes the artwork to draw attention to scholarship opportunities for Indigenous women in Canada. The charitable organization provides art scholarships that are hosted on Instagram and Facebook.

== Scholarships ==
Modern Métis Woman provides yearly scholarships to self-identifying Métis women attending post-secondary school in Canada. Financial contributions by the charity for Indigenous women's post-secondary education follows the Truth and Reconciliation Commission of Canada call to action.

=== Past scholarship winners ===
Year	Winner	School	Community
2025	Laurel Schaffer	University of Calgary	Métis Nation of Alberta
2024	Cailey Ives	University of Minnesota	Manitoba Métis Federation
2023	Nevada Lynn	Emily Carr University of Art + Design	Métis Nation British Columbia (MNBC)
2022	Ashley Nicole Matthews	Sault College	Métis Nation of Ontario
2022	Camryn Dewar	Montclair State University	Manitoba Métis Federation
2022	Rebecca Toman	Lakehead University	Métis Nation of Ontario
2021	Tatianna Pelletier	Northern Alberta Institute of Technology	Métis Nation of Alberta
2021	Hannah Gragg	Full Sail University	Wyandotte Nation
2020	Madalaine Desaulniers	University of Victoria (Faculty of Law)	Métis Nation of Alberta.
2019	Brittany Schroeder	University of Alberta (Medicine)	Métis Nation British Columbia (MNBC)
2019	Brittany Schroeder	University of Alberta (Medicine)	Vernon & District Métis Association (VDMA)
2018	Alana Robert	University of Toronto (Osgoode Hall Law School)	Anishinaabe-Métis
2018	Alana Robert	University of Toronto (Osgoode Hall Law School)	Manitoba Métis Federation
