= Womyn-born womyn =

Term developed during second-wave feminism

Womyn-born womyn (WBW) is a term developed during second-wave feminism to designate women who were assigned female at birth, were raised as girls, and identify as women (or womyn, a deliberately alternative spelling meant to challenge the centering of male as norm). The policy is noted for exclusion of trans women. Third-wave feminism and fourth-wave feminism have generally done away with the idea of WBW.

Events and organizations that have womyn-born womyn only policies bar access to anyone who was assigned male at birth: cis men, trans women, and male children older than a determined age.

== Second-wave feminism ==
The term womyn-born womyn gained usage and popularity during the second wave feminist movement. In 1978, the Lesbian Organization of Toronto adopted a womyn-born womyn-only policy in response to a request for admittance by a transgender woman who identified as lesbian. Womyn-born womyn policies held that the nature of the feminine experience over the course of a lifetime could only be experienced by someone who experienced life presenting as a woman. The intent was to create a space for only women, defined not by identity but experience, excluding transgender women as a result.

Key anti-trans proponents in the second wave feminist movement included Janice Raymond, Robin Morgan, Germaine Greer, Andrea Dworkin, and Mary Daly, who were proponents of womyn-born womyn policies. These policies created controversy and scholarly discussion.

Raymond's The Transsexual Empire (1979) is often seen as the characterizing work of this movement; Julia Serano criticizes it as an "anti-trans screed". It is known for its view of trans women as privileged men who did not previously live in the oppression of the patriarchy, stating, "We know who we are. We know that we are women who are born with female chromosomes and anatomy, and that whether or not we were socialised to be so-called normal women, patriarchy has treated and will treat us like women. Transsexuals have not had this same history."

Sheila Jeffreys was similarly outspoken in her criticisms of trans women, arguing that the feminine characteristics they were adopting are simply those that women must adopt to avoid punishment from the patriarchy. She believed trans women adopt stereotypical attributes that are enforced by the patriarchy and were political signifiers of the oppression of women (see social construction of gender).

Judith Butler (regarded as the "most significant theorist" of third-wave feminism) is opposed to womyn-born-womyn policies, yet is often used as an argument for them by modern second-wave feminists. Butler's 1990 book Gender Trouble: Feminism and the Subversion of Identity contained discussion of performativity versus performance, which second-wave feminists used to exclude trans women on account of their performativity through repetition of gender norms, which is "real only to the extent that it is performed", which was used as a separator from experience.

=== Third and fourth wave perspectives ===
Julia Serano, writing in 2007, sharply criticized WBW as transmisogyny. She points to a double standard: trans men were allowed in WBW spaces, but trans women were not. In effect, this meant that trans men were treated as if they were women. Serano criticizes the WBW idea as inherently sexist against women, which goes against the very idea of feminism. Preventing pre-op trans women, she says, is phallocentric and objectifies trans women, and countered that butches are well tolerated in the feminist community despite their mannishness. If women can transcend their socialization, she argues so too can women assigned male at birth, adding that the idea that trans women, having been socialized as men, have some unique "male energy" is in fact just making the case that men have abilities women do not, which is anti-feminist.

Author Nadia Khayrallah finds the WBW idea at odds with itself. They wonder how one can choose to be labelled a "womyn", but then claim biological determinism by stating one is born a "womyn".

== Women-only spaces ==
A women-only space is an area where only women are allowed, thus providing a place where they do not have to interact with men. Historically and globally, many cultures had, and many still have, some form of female seclusion. Organizations and events with womyn-born womyn policies specifically exclude trans women from these spaces, restricting access to only cisgender women. This exclusionary practice reflects a contested understanding of womanhood and has been criticized for perpetuating transphobia and failing to recognize the diversity of women’s lived experiences.

=== Michigan Womyn's Music Festival ===
Throughout the final quarter of the twentieth century, women's music festivals often enacted womyn-born womyn policies.

Founded in 1976, Michigan Womyn's Music Festival (MichFest) had a policy of only allowing womyn-born womyn.

In 1977, MichFest's primary owner, Lisa Vogel, signed a letter (together with 21 other signatories) to the feminist music collective Olivia Records, objecting to the inclusion of transgender production employees at the festival, notably Sandy Stone:

We are writing concerning your decision to employ Sandy Stone...as your recording engineer and sound technician. We feel that it was and is irresponsible of you to have presented this person as a woman to the women's community when in fact he is a post-operative transsexual. The decision to work with a transsexual is one issue in itself; but the omission of this information from the public of women who support you was an unwise choice....We do not believe that a man without a penis is a woman any more than we would accept a white woman with dyed skin as a Black woman. Sandy Stone grew up as a white male in this culture, with all the privileges and attitudes that that insures [sic]. It was his white male privilege that gave him access to the recording studio and the opportunity to gain engineering practice in the first place. He has never had to suffer the discrimination, self-hatred or fear that a woman must endure and survive in her life...How can we share feelings of sisterhood and solidarity with someone who has not had a woman's experience?

In 2006, the New York Times noted that every year MichFest came around it highlighted tensions in the feminist and gay communities about trans exclusive polices.

In 2014, Equality Michigan launched a petition calling the festival to withdraw its 'Womyn Born Womyn' intention, stating "... we will no longer respect the 'intention' or that 'leaving the onus on each individual to choose whether or how to respect it' equates to inclusion.. ".

After 40 years, the Michigan Womyn's Music Festival held its last event in 2015. In the same year three organisations withdrew their support of the Equality Michigan petition (National Center for Lesbian Rights, National LGBTQ Task Force, and The TransAdvocate nonprofit) website. The organisations said they would seek other ways to engage MichFest over its 'Womyn Born Womyn' intention.

=== The RadFem Collective ===
The RadFem Collective, a UK-based radical feminist group, describes its membership as "restricted to 'women born women and living as women'" and promotes womyn-born womyn policies. The statement for the 2015 conference was rephrased in explanatory form to read "RadFems Resist is a women only, feminist event. Our conference is a space for women to share our experiences as women, to politically self organise for women's liberation and to celebrate womanhood in a safe environment. We welcome all women who were raised and socialized as girls to join us...We are gender abolitionists who have been raised and socialized as girls and women *because of our female bodies* in the context of patriarchy."

== See also ==
- Cultural feminism
- Sex segregation
- Women-only space
- Womyn's land
- Feminist views on transgender topics
- Transphobia
- Alternative spellings of woman
