= Janine Canan =

American poet (1942–2020)

Janine Canan (1942-2020) was an American poet, essayist, story writer, translator, and editor. She was also a practicing psychiatrist in northern California.

== Biography ==
Born Janine Burford on November 2, 1942, in Los Angeles, California, she graduated from Stanford University cum laude in 1963. She married Michael Canan, a law student, and moved to Berkeley where she did graduate study and taught at the University of California.

In her thirties, she attended New York University School of Medicine and completed a psychiatric residency at Herrick and Mount Zion Hospitals in the San Francisco Bay Area. Since 1979, Canan has been active in private psychiatric practice, consulting for various clinics and organizations, and volunteered for Amma's Embracing the World charities.

Her first book of poems, Of Your Seed, appeared in 1977 through a National Endowment for the Arts grant to Oyez Press. Since that time, Canan has authored many books of poetry, translations, anthologies, essays and stories.

In 1989, her anthology, She Rises like the Sun: Invocations of the Goddess by Contemporary American Women Poets, illustrated by Mayumi Oda, considered "one of the best books from the women's spirituality movement" by Booklist and widely used in Women's Studies.

Canan's translations of the German Jewish poet Else Lasker-Schüler, Star in My Forehead, was a Booksense and City Lights Books "pick".

Canan also published a collection of short stories, Journeys with Justine, featured in Longstoryshort, illustrated by Cristina Biaggi, in 2007, along with a first collection of essays, Goddesses, Goddesses, followed by a second collection in 2015, My Millennium: Culture, Spirituality, and the Divine Feminine.

Canan's writing has appeared in anthologies and journals including the San Francisco Chronicle, New Directions, Exquisite Corpse, WeMoon, Femspec, Tower Journal, Journal of Archaeomythology and the Journal of Hindu Studies.

Canan died October 26, 2020.

Canan's papers are housed in the University of Iowa's Special Collections, and her books in the University of California at Berkeley Bancroft Library.

== Publications ==
- 1977: Of Your Seed, Janine Canan, Oyez Press, Berkeley.
- 1981: Daughter, Janine Canan, illustrated by Donna Brookman, Emily Dickinson Press, Berkeley.
- 1981: Who Buried the Breast of Dreams, Janine Canan, Emily Dickinson Press, Berkeley
- 1982: Shapes of Self, Janine Canan, Emily Dickinson Press, Berkeley.
- 1986: Her Magnificent Body, New & Selected Poems, Janine Canan, Manroot Press, San Francisco.
- 1989: She Rises like the Sun: Invocations of the Goddess by Contemporary American Women Poets, edited by Janine Canan, The Crossing Press, Freedom, Calif.
- 1997: Goddess Poems, Janine Canan, Sagittarius Press, Port Townsend, Wash.
- 1998: Love, Enter, Janine Canan, Open Bone Press, Port Angeles, Wash.
- 2000: Changing Woman, Janine Canan, Scars Publications, Chicago.
- 2000: Star in My Forehead: Selected Poems by Else Lasker-Schüler, translated by Janine Canan, Holy Cow! Press, Duluth, Minn.
- 2000: The Rhyme of the Ag-ed Mariness: Last Poems of Lynn Lonidier, edited by Janine Canan, Station Hill Press, Barrytown, N.Y.
- 2003: In the Palace of Creation: Selected Works 1969—1999, Janine Canan, illustrated by Meagan Shapiro, Scars Publications, Chicago.
- 2004: Messages from Amma: In the Language of the Heart, edited by Janine Canan, Random House/Celestial Arts, New York. Published by Jaico Publishing, Mumbai, India, 2009, and AsSaggi Bompiani, Milan, Italy, 2005 (Amma, Abbracciare il mondo: messaggi per la vita).
- 2007: Goddesses, Goddesses: Essays by Janine Canan, Regent Press, Oakland, Calif.
- 2007: Journeys with Justine, Janine Canan, illustrated by Cristina Biaggi, Regent Press, Oakland, Calif.
- 2010: Under the Azure: Selected Poems of Francis Jammes, translated by Janine Canan, Littlefox Press, Melbourne.
- 2010: Walk Now in Beauty: The Legend of Changing Woman, Janine Canan, illustrated by Ernest Posey, trilingual edition in English, Spanish & Japanese, Regent Press, Oakland, Calif. First edition English only, 2007.
- 2012: Ardor: Poems of Life, Janine Canan, Pilgrims Press, Varanasi, India.
- 2012: Mensajes de Amma: Con el Lenguaje del Corazon, editado por Janine Canan, Gaia Ediciones.
- 2013: Garland of Love: 108 Sayings by Mata Amritanandamayi, edited by Janine Canan, M. A. Center, San Ramon, Calif.
- 2014: Mystic Bliss: Poems, Janine Canan, Rui Publishing, Amadora, Portugal, Kindle and Windows App.
- 2015: Under the Azure: Selected Poems of Francis Jammes, translated by Janine Canan, Littlefox Press, Melbourne, revised second edition.
- 2015: Mystisches Glück: Gedichte, Janine Canan, translated by Peter K. Geiger, English and German, bilingual edition, Emily Dickinson Press, Sonoma, Calif.
- 2015: My Millennium: Culture, Spirituality, the Divine Feminine, Janine Canan, illustrated by Cristina Biaggi, Regent Press, Berkeley.
