= Miguxês =

Portuguese Internet slang

Miguxês (Portuguese pronunciation: [miɡuˈʃes] or [miɣuˈʃeʃ]), also known in Portugal as pita talk or pita script (pronounced [ˈpitɐ]), is an Internet slang of the Portuguese language that was popular in the 2000s and early 2010s among Brazilian teenagers on the Internet and other electronic media, such as messages written on cell phones.

== Brief history ==
Its name derives from miguxo, a corruption from amiguxo, turn a term used for amiguinho, or "buddy" in Portuguese. This sociolect of Vernacular Brazilian Portuguese brought possible simplifications in the grammatical structures, since the vehicles in which miguxês was used were nearly universally colloquial, often space-delimited (such as SMS messages, instant messengers or social networks). It also tended to have "simpler" orthography in comparison to standard Portuguese orthography, which led to the most strong criticism to it (miguxês without its common alternative spellings was associated with the just normal Internet and/or youth slang).

There are identitarian and orthographic differences between the so-called leetspeak, miguxês, tiopês and internetês — Brazilian Portuguese for netspeak, which is by far the one that most closely resembles standard Portuguese —, all common sociolects that were found in the Portuguese-speaking digital network community, the three latter ones created in it.

Basically, the use of each category depended on the individual choice and the environment in which people were interacting. While in the Internet, in a general manner, there is a handful of a different phenomenon in which users communicate with abbreviations to simplify writing, miguxês carried with it an effective intention, that is, to express an infantile language in a conversation between friends, or even satirize this style of communication. In certain subcultures in Brazil, especially in the case of what is called 'emo' there, miguxês was an item of group identification. So it was not unusual for someone which opposes such subcultures to also develop a distaste for miguxês. Brazilian 'anti-emo' groups usually satirized 'emo' teenagers with use of miguxês.

Together with the cited urban tribes, they started to fall out of the mainstream in the early 2010s, so that they have much lower popularity with the following teen generation that did not see its spreading as a frequent Internet meme.

== Spelling ==
Although orthography rules of miguxês may vary individually, and also in each region and in different urban tribes since it is plain broken Portuguese, there are certain characteristics often commonly found as:

- Replacement of s and c for x, simulating the palatalization of native Portuguese-speaking children's speech through their language acquisition: você (Second person singular), vocês (Second person plural) > vuxeh, vuxeix;
- Omission or replacement of diacritics, notably by replacing an acute accent over a vowel with the letter h after the vowel as in é ("is") > eh (to distinguish it from the word e meaning "and") or será ("will be") > serah. Or replacing the tilde with n/m to indicate nasalization: não ("no") > nawn/naum
- Replacement of i by ee, influenced by English orthography: gatinha (female kitten, also a slang for pretty girl) > gateenha;
- Replacement of o and e by u and i respectively, specially in non-tonic syllables: quero (I want) > keru.
- Replacing the digraph qu and the letter c as k both for brevity and as a form of sensational spelling, and deleting the u of these environments: quem (who), escreveu (wrote) > kem, ixkrevew

== Tiopês ==
Brazilian indie and scene kids used a related Internet sociolect, the tiopês (from tiop, which is a corruption of Portuguese tipo, or equivalent to English "like, totally", in tiopês), which mainly uses ingroup memes as well purposeful ridiculous-sounding misspellings to add humor or irony to the message and bring group identification, much like teh of English-derived leetspeak. As it is common for the miguxês, there are detractors of tiopês, although much less numbered and for different reasons (usually, people which are detractors at the same time of different youth subcultures deemed alienated, including 'emo' teenagers, scene kids and indie kids). Tiopês is also much less common in the Portuguese-speaking Internet community, and is said to be a phenomenon limited to Brazil.

=== Example ===
Tiopês
amiogs, eo tiop a~mo a dercycolpëdya, rsrsrs1!!11! o artigo deels sorb noës indys eh tuod mas asi~m meninës nein toads os saitys de parödjas soa lezgaus tiop augums pormoven ~polëmicas~ conmo precomseiots e eu noa asho iso valiod un boa~m eggzenpel ~master no ingreis AEAEAEAE~ seriä a tau da emceeclopëdia dramatchyca q aepzar do noem noa shorem leëtros pro sel fin11!11!
Rough colloquial Portuguese translation of the tiopês piece
Gente, eu absolutamente adoro a Desciclopédia, hahahaha, o artigo deles sobre nós indies é tudo, mas tenho algo a dizer a vocês, nem todos os sites de paródia são legais, alguns deles promovem coisas controversas como preconceitos, e eu não acho esse tipo de coisa válida, um bom exemplo seria uma certa Encyclopedia Dramatica que apesar do nome, não é de se sofrer um drama por seu fim.
English, literal translation of the Portuguese piece
You guys, I [have to tell that I] absolutely love/adore Uncyclopedia, hahahaha, their [Portuguese] article on us indie kids is awesome, but I have something to say [to you], not every parody site is cool, some of them promote controversial things such as [a number of] prejudices, and I am reticent of [all] this kind of thing, a good example would be a so-called Encyclopedia Dramatica that in spite of its name, would not be worth of a drama because of its end.

== See also ==
- SMS language
- Cyberculture
- Internet meme
