= We'Moon =

Astrological and lunar calendar datebook

We'Moon: Gaia Rhythms for Womyn is an astrological and lunar calendar datebook, featuring art and writing submitted by, for and about women. "Wemoon" means "women," "we of the Moon" (for other alternative political spellings, see Womyn). The datebook was founded in 1981 and is published annually in Oregon, USA, by Mother Tongue Ink (d.b.a. We’Moon Company). We'Moon is a publication focused on “helping women make their daily lives sacred and align themselves with Earth and Moon rhythms.”

== History ==
We'Moon was inspired by the women’s liberation and emerging people's movements of the 1960s and 1970s, and came to fruition in the 1980s as a vehicle for the creative expression of women's empowerment and earth-based spirituality. The idea of a special calendar for women—based on lunar, solar and astrological cycles—originated at Kvindelandet, an international women’s land in Denmark where 50–60 lesbians from different countries lived together in the late 1970s. The first We'Moon was self-published in France in 1981 under the name of Mother Tongue Ink, as a pocket-sized astrological moon calendar diary, handwritten in five languages. The first five editions were pocket-sized, homemade, and continually evolving in format, design and technology, changing languages every year. During these years, the datebook was created by groups of volunteers in various locations in Europe.

We'Moon '87 was the first edition created in the U.S., where production has remained. Mother Tongue Ink, d.b.a. We’Moon Company, was incorporated in 1995. In 2009, Mother Tongue Ink published a children’s book, The Last Wild Witch, by Starhawk, illustrated by Lindy Kehoe. In the Spirit of We’Moon – Celebrating 30 years – An Anthology of We’Moon Art and Writing, was released in 2011. In the Spirit of We'Moon is "an anthology of writing and art originally published in the annual publication We'Moon, with commentary and other new material."

== Contents ==
We'Moon sends out an annual Call for Contributions to women internationally, and publishes approximately 250 pieces of original art and writing in each year’s datebook. We'Moon’s thematic focus includes feminism, goddess and earth-based spirituality, world community, environmentalism, peace and justice. The datebook includes articles by astrologers Gretchen Lawlor, Heather Roan Robbins, Susan Levitt and Sandra Pastorius. Lunar phase and astrological aspect data are listed for each date.

Over the years, We'Moon has published work by thousands of contributing women, including writings by Joanna Macy, Starhawk, Susun Weed, Winona LaDuke, Carolyn Gage, Myshkin, Vicki Noble, Donna Henes, Alice Walker, and founding editor Musawa, and art by Monica Sjoo, Tee Corinne, Meinrad Craighead, Toni Truesdale, Betty LaDuke, Sandra Stanton, Leah Dorion, Max Dashu, Sudie Rakusin and Hrana Janto.
