= BOLDfest =

Canadian annual lesbian-communal conference

Coordinates: 49.2883°N 123.1222°W

BOLDfest (Bold Older Lesbians and Dykes) is an annual conference held in Vancouver, British Columbia to create community for lesbians over 45 from Canada and the United States. The conference is held by BOLD, a non-profit society, which states that its mission is "to raise the visibility of older lesbians, and to provide a venue to meet and to share information and opportunities for learning, networking, and organizing". BOLDfest was created to create community for older lesbians, combat isolation and age-based exclusion from other facets of the queer community, and to remember and celebrate lesbian histories.

BOLD was founded in 2004 by Pat Hogan and Claire Robson, and the annual conference is held in West Vancouver at the West Coast Plaza hotel on the weekend following Labour Day weekend. The annual gathering features workshops, dances, musical performances, and an array of social events. BOLD also features an award for BOLD Woman of the Year, honouring one woman from the North American lesbian community who has made significant contributions and who is underrepresented by the mainstream media. In 2014, BOLD celebrated their 10-year anniversary and honoured Margy Lesher, cofounder of The Lesbian Connection, the longest running worldwide lesbian publication, as BOLD Woman of the Year. Over the years, BOLD has held a number of larger panel discussions during the conference, featuring many prominent lesbian and queer scholars, activists, and figures.
