= Stop Esso campaign =

Environmental campaign against ExxonMobil

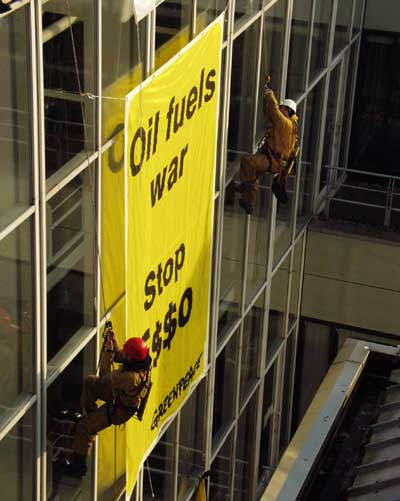
Greenpeace protest against Esso

The Stop Esso campaign was a campaign by Greenpeace, Friends of the Earth and People and Planet aimed at boycotting the oil company ExxonMobil (which owns and operates the brand Esso), on the grounds that it is damaging the environment.

The campaign alleges that Esso / ExxonMobil is:

- not investing in renewable energy sources
- denying the existence of global warming
- funding the creation of junk science which denies climate change, delaying urgently needed climate change action
- undermining the Kyoto Protocol.

== Stop Esso (France) website injunction ==
In the early 2000s, Greenpeace was sued in France by Esso, who alleged that the company's reputation was damaged by the campaign's use of a parody Esso logo featuring dollar signs in place of the letters "ss".

Esso claimed that the $$ resemble the SS of the Nazi paramilitary organization. In 2002, a French court ruled in favour of Esso, granting them an injunction against the French website. The campaign then moved their French web site to the United States. Another French judge has subsequently overturned the original ruling, so the site has moved back to France. The Stop Esso campaign continues to use the dollar sign logo.

== Esso's greenhouse gas production ==
Stop Esso's consumer boycott has focused on the greenhouse gas production and climate change policies of Esso. Esso's critics claim the company produces twice the CO_{2} pollution of a country such as Norway. Company data revealed a 2% increase in greenhouse gas production in 2004 to 135.6m tonnes. Supporters of Stop Esso argue that BP has a similar level of production as Esso with nearly 50% less greenhouse gas emissions. One environmental consultancy believed Esso underestimated its greenhouse gas production because it excluded petrol stations and tankers. It estimates Exxon's production at over 300m tonnes.

== Esso's reaction ==
In response to Stop Esso, Esso gave financial support to climate change research. However, it continued to encourage President Bush and other world leaders not to sign the Kyoto Protocol which mandates decreased production of greenhouse gases.

A proportion of Esso's greenhouse gas production arose because of the flaring of gas in Nigeria. When natural gas is brought out with oil, Esso in Nigeria burned the gas rather than processing it. Esso pledged to cease this practice by 2006.

At the same time, Exxon-Mobil funded provided the non-profit, Public Interest Watch, with $120,000 of the group's $124,094 budget covering August 2003 to July 2004, when the group called for the Internal Revenue Service to audit Greenpeace USA According to Phil Radford, Greenpeace USA Executive Director, "We might not have thought more about it, but in 2006, the Wall Street Journal reported Public Interest Watch wasn't as obscure a group as we'd thought. Instead, Public Interest Watch received $120,000 of its $124,000 budget from ExxonMobil, the multinational entity Greenpeace has clashed with for years over its drilling, spilling, and denial of climate change." Greenpeace USA received a clean audit from the IRS.

== Stop Esso days ==
- UK
  - December 1, 2001 - about 306 Esso stations boycotted
  - May 18, 2002 - about 400 Esso stations boycotted
- Luxembourg
  - October 25, 2002 - all 28 Esso stations boycotted

== See also ==
- Esso
- ExxonMobil
- Global warming controversy
