= Amazon Acres =

Australian women-only community

Coordinates: 31.442°S 152.733°E

Amazon Acres was a women-only community located in northern New South Wales, Australia, and inhabited from the mid-1970s to the mid-1980s.

== History ==
Amazon Acres was founded in 1974 on 405 hectares (1,000 acres) of land near Wauchope, about 400 kilometres (250 miles) north of Sydney. It was located on a mountaintop, and was also known as The Mountain.

The community was founded by women from the Melbourne and Sydney Radicalesbians, including academic Kerryn Higgs, who were dissatisfied with life in mainstream society and wanted to experiment with communal ways of living. The purchase of the land was made with money donated by women in Australian lesbian and feminist communities. By the summer of 1974, there were around 25 inhabitants.

In 1970s Australia, all-women separatist groups were largely urban-based. However, the land on which Amazon Acres was founded was mostly uncleared remote bushland. The inhabitants had issues cultivating the land and struggled to grow crops due to poor soil.

The members of the Amazon Acres community encountered problems with locals, including a local resident who did not want the women crossing her property and felled trees to block access to the road. The access case spent two years in court, which the women of Amazon Acres eventually won.

The community's population ranged from 10 to 100 women during the decade it existed. The last residents left in the mid-1980s after the commune was no longer self-sufficient, although the co-operative still owns the land and meets twice a year.

== Ideology ==
Amazon Acres was part of a larger 'womyn's land' movement, examples of which were also seen in the United States and Wales. It was founded on the basis of a separation from men and drew women from all walks of life. In the March edition of the 1974 Sydney Women's Liberation Newsletter, Amazon Acres was described as a "a place where women can go to get stronger, as a break from the struggle with male culture". Men and meat were largely banned, and machines also were often rejected as products of patriarchy. Nudity was common within the community.

The organisation of Amazon Acres consisted of collective structures and the sharing of material possessions. Decision making in the community was achieved by consensus, and childcare and chores were shared among the community members.

A more formal structure, consisting of a closed collective, was created in the early 1980s with women who had financially contributed to the lands since 1974.

Some members of the community felt more strongly about the ban on men than others, with some members demanding a total ban, including male children over the age of six. The women who strongly believed in separatism moved to the newly formed neighbouring communities called The Valley and Herland.
