= Woman's Commonwealth =

American women's land-based commune

The Woman's Commonwealth (also Belton Sanctificationists and Sisters of Sanctification) was a women's land-based commune first established in Belton, Texas. It was founded in the late 1870s to early 1880s by Martha McWhirter and her women's bible study group on land that was inherited when the women's husbands died or quit the home.

== Members ==
Residents of the commune were women and their dependent children; many of the women fled abusive homes to join the community. At one point, there were between 42 and 50 women members on record, including at least one African American woman who is thought to have been a former slave.

== Ideology ==
The Sisters embraced first wave feminist ideologies, and sought spiritual, economic, and social equality for women. To that end, they practiced celibacy as a way to liberate women from the spiritual degradation of heterosexual intercourse, the oppressive needs of children and child rearing, and male violence. In the 1880s, the citizens of Belton blamed the Sanctificationists for rising separation and divorce rates, and of undermining the meaning of marriage through their practice of celibacy.

== History ==
The Sanctificationists were economically successful; they ran several boarding houses and two hotels, formed holding companies to manage their properties, and operated two farms to provide food for their multiple dining rooms. They started the first public library in Belton, the Woman's Wednesday Club Library, out of one of their boarding houses.

In 1899, the entire commune moved to Washington, DC where they opened boarding houses and a hotel, and participated in urban feminist organizations. In 1903, there were ten remaining members who purchased a farm in rural Maryland to provide food for their urban dining halls, and to provide a pastoral retreat for themselves in a rural landscape. McWhirter died in 1904, and the commune began a slow decline.

The last member of the commune died in 1983 at the age of 101.

== Impact ==
The George and Martha McWhirter House at 400 North Pearl St., Belton, Texas, is on the National Register of Historic Places listings in Bell County, Texas. At the address, there is a historical marker dedicated to the Sanctificationists. Jan Berliner Statman considers the Woman's Commonwealth to be one of the first women's shelters in the United States.

A brief article published in the lesbian separatist periodical, Austindyke (alternately spelled as Austin Dyke), in 1979 and then reprinted in Sisters United in 1980 described the Woman's Commonwealth as a forerunner of the lesbian land movement. It is unclear whether the Sanctificationists influenced the movement that flourished in the 1970s and 1980s.
