= Alternative spellings of woman =

Feminist alternative spellings of "women"

Womxn and womyn are alternative political spellings of the English word woman, used by some feminists. There are other spellings, including womban (a reference to the womb or uterus) or womon (singular), and wombyn or wimmin (plural). Some writers who use such alternative spellings, avoiding the suffix "-man" or "-men", see them as an expression of female independence and a repudiation of traditions that define women by reference to a male norm.

These re-spellings existed alongside the use of herstory, a feminist re-examination and re-telling of history.

== Definitions ==
The Oxford English Dictionary (OED) defines womyn as "in feminist use: women."

The OED added womxn in 2021, and defines it as "adopted by some as a more inclusive alternative to womyn, which is perceived as marginalizing certain groups, especially ethnic minority and transgender women". Dictionary.com added womxn to its dictionary in 2019 with the definition "used, especially in intersectional feminism, as an alternative spelling to avoid the suggestion of sexism perceived in the sequences m-a-n and m-e-n, and to be inclusive of trans and nonbinary people."

See also:

- The dictionary definition of womyn at Wiktionary
- The dictionary definition of womxn at Wiktionary

== Old English ==
The word woman is derived from the Old English word wīfmann ('woman-person'), which is formed from wīf (the source of wife), then meaning 'woman', and mann (the source of man), then meaning 'person, human', originally without connotations of gender. Man took on its additional masculine meaning in the Late Middle English period, replacing the now-obsolete word wer. This has created the present situation with man bearing a dual meaning—either masculine or nonspecific.

Old English had a system of grammatical gender, whereby every noun was treated as either masculine, feminine or neuter, similar to modern German. In Old English sources, the word man was grammatically masculine but gender-neutral in meaning. One of its meanings was similar to the modern English usage of "one" as a gender-neutral indefinite pronoun (compare with mankind (man + kind), which means the human race, and German man, which has retained the indefinite pronoun meaning to the modern day). The words wer and wīf were used, when necessary, to specify a man or woman, respectively. Combining them into werman or wīfman expressed the concept of "any man" or "any woman". Some feminist writers have suggested that this more symmetrical usage reflected more egalitarian notions of gender at the time.

== 18th and 19th century uses ==
The term wimmin was considered by George P. Krapp (1872–1934), an American scholar of English, to be eye dialect, the literary technique of using nonstandard spelling that implies a pronunciation of the given word that is actually standard. The spelling indicates that the character's speech overall is dialectal, foreign, or uneducated. This form of nonstandard spelling differs from others in that a difference in spelling does not indicate a difference in pronunciation of a word. That is, it is dialect to the eye rather than to the ear. It suggests that a character "would use a vulgar pronunciation if there were one" and "is at the level of ignorance where one misspells in this fashion, hence mispronounces as well."

The word womyn appeared as an Older Scots spelling of woman in the Scots poetry of James Hogg. The word wimmin appeared in 19th-century renderings of Black American English, without any feminist significance.

== 20th century: second-wave feminism and womyn ==
Second-wave feminism developed several alternative political spellings of the word woman, especially womyn. Keridwen Luis, a sociologist at Brandeis University, states that feminists have experimented for decades to devise a suitable alternative for the term identifying the female gender. Such terms have included wimmin (in the 1990s), based upon the original Old English term, and womyn (since at least 1975).

The usage of "womyn" as a feminist spelling of women (with womon as the singular form) first appeared in print in 1976 referring to the first Michigan Womyn's Music Festival. This is just after the founding of the Mountain Moving Coffeehouse for Womyn and Children, a lesbian feminist social event centred around women's music. Both the annual "MichFest" and the weekly coffeehouse operated a womyn-born womyn (cisgender women-only) policy. Womyn's land was another usage of the term, associated with separatist feminism.

When 1970s feminism in Australia was at its peak, the Wimmins Circus, a feminist circus troupe which combined circus skills, comedy, and music in their performances, was established in Melbourne in 1979.

Z. Budapest promoted the use of the word wimmin (singular womon) in the 1970s as part of her Dianic Wicca movement, which claims that present-day patriarchy represents a fall from a matriarchal golden age.

Millie Tant, a fictional character in the British satirical comic Viz, often used the term wimmin when discussing women's rights.

== 2010s: fourth-wave feminism and womxn ==
In the mid 2010s, fourth-wave feminism focused on intersectionality and debated whether to use womxn as a term more inclusive of trans women, or whether to avoid womxn because it implied trans women are not women.

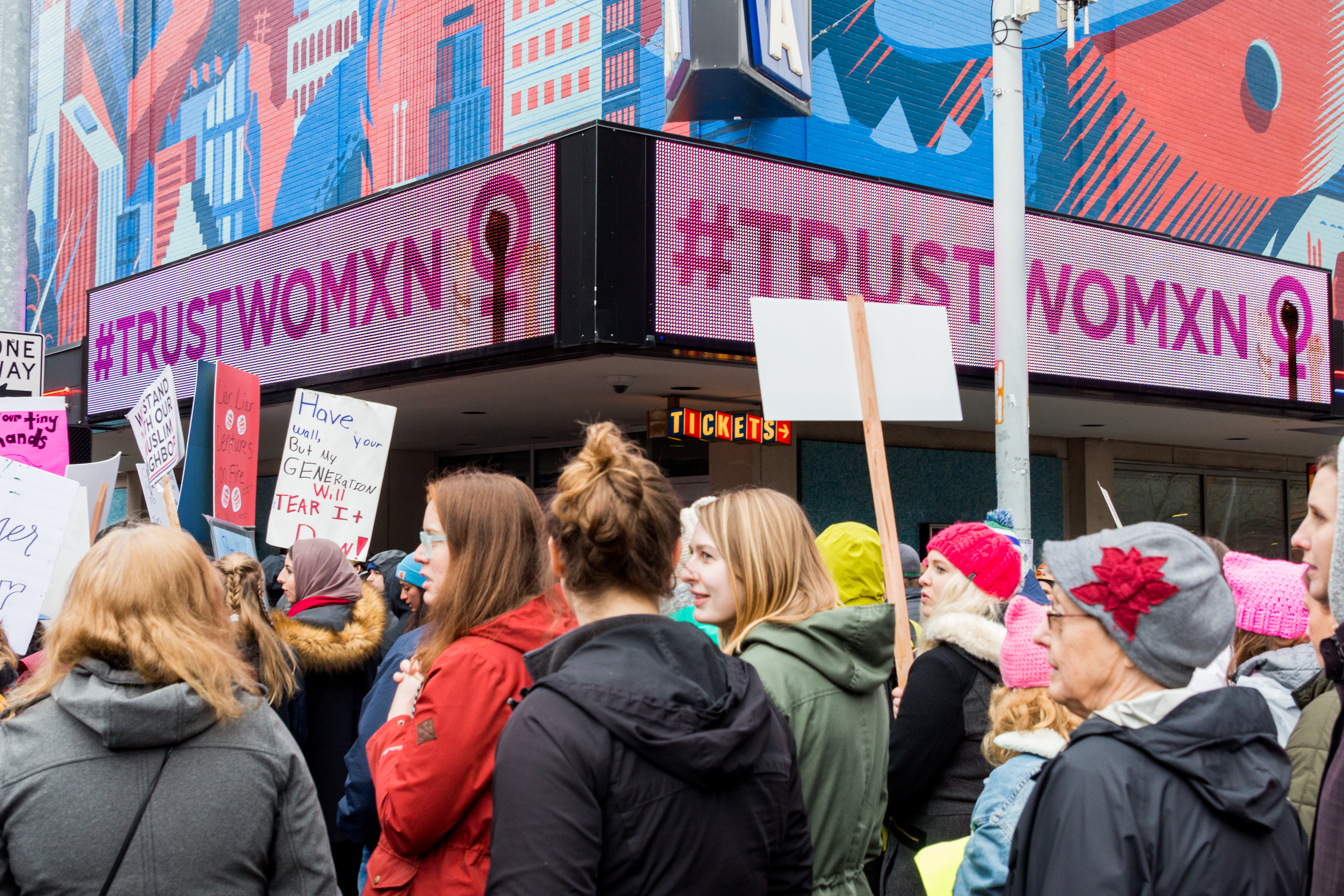
Womxn's March on Seattle, 2018

In 2017, the Womxn's March on Seattle chose to use the term "womxn" to promote the march. Elizabeth Hunter-Keller, the event's communications chair, told The New York Times that they chose it based upon the recommendation of a core organizer, who was a nonbinary person, and to reflect the organizing group's diversity. Nita Harker, a sociologist and organizer of the march praised the term womxn for its ambiguity in pronunciation, saying that it forces users to "stop and think". The Boston Globe, reporting on the march, called womxn term "a powerful, increasingly popular label, encompassing a broader range of gender identities than 'woman'—or even older feminist terms such as 'womyn' ... a nontraditional spelling for people whose gender identity doesn’t fit in the traditional boxes".

In January 2018, Portland held the Indigenous Womxn's March, dedicated to missing and murdered indigenous girls, women, and transgender people.

In 2018, student university groups in the US and UK used womxn in communications, such as advertising for "Womxn’s Basketball Session" and "Womxn of Color Network".

In 2018, the Wellcome Collection, a museum and library in London, made an announcement through Twitter using the term womxn to demonstrate their goal of including diverse perspectives; after complaints from hundreds of followers, the museum later apologized and removed the term from its website. Labour Party politician Jess Phillips responded to the incident by saying, "I've never met a trans woman who was offended by the word woman being used, so I'm not sure why this keeps happening". Clara Bradbury-Rance of King's College London conjectured that the push-back was because the use of the term was seen as too simplistic and a "fix-all".

In a 2019 Styles article published in The New York Times, journalist Breena Kerr stated that while womxn was difficult to pronounce, it was "perhaps the most inclusive word yet".

On 1 March 2021, the streaming platform Twitch used the term womxn to promote events celebrating Women's History Month. The event was announced through Twitter, which led to immediate backlash from various users who considered the term transphobic for implying that trans women are not women but a separate category (womxn). Twitch removed the tweet and apologised, stating that they wanted to use the word to acknowledge the shortcomings of gender-binary language and that they would use the term "women" moving forward.

== Controversies ==
The terms womyn and womxn have been criticised for being unnecessary or confusing neologisms, due to the uncommonness of mxn to describe men.

The word womyn has been criticised by transgender people due to its usage in trans-exclusionary radical feminist circles which exclude trans women from identifying into the category of "woman", particularly the term womyn-born womyn. The term wombyn was also particularly criticized by trans advocates since it implies that a woman must have a womb to be a woman.

Some trans-inclusionary feminists argue in favor of the word womxn as being more inclusive of transgender women, non-binary people, and intersex women, while other trans-inclusionary feminists criticize the term womxn for the implication that trans women are not women but are a separate category, or for the implication that non-binary people are women. Jennie Kermode, chair of Trans Media Watch, stated in 2018 that the organization would not use the term womxn, considering that women already includes trans women.

== See also ==
- Feminist language reform
- Gender-neutral language
- LGBTQ linguistics
- Man (word)
- We'Moon
- Womyn-born womyn
- Otherization
- Fourth-wave feminism
- Transfeminism
- List of transgender-related topics
- Latinx
- Herstory
- Womyn's land
