= Club Passim =

Folk music club in Cambridge, Massachusetts, U.S.

Coordinates: 42°22′26″N 71°7′12″W

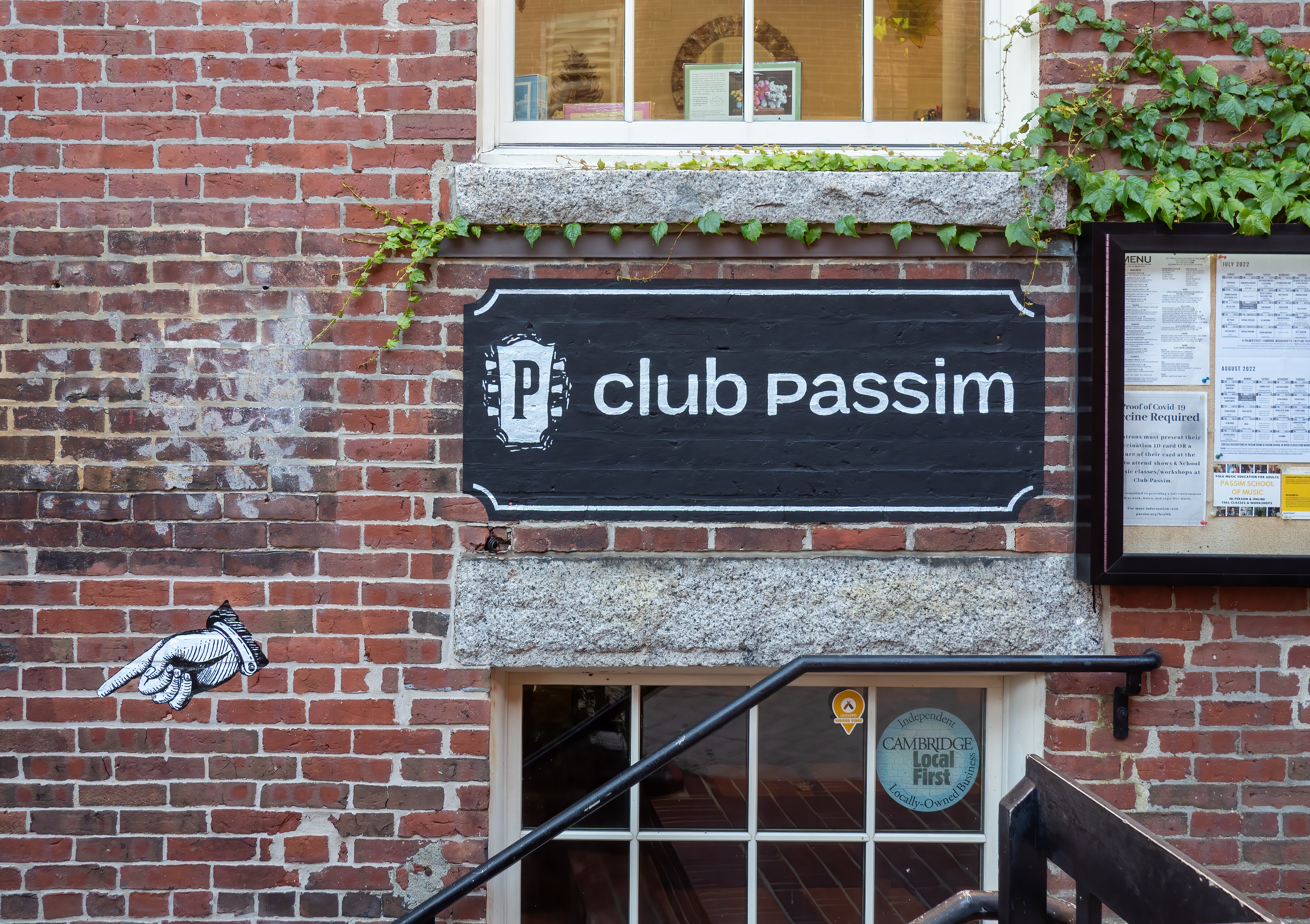
Entrance on Palmer Street

Club Passim is an American folk music club in the Harvard Square area of Cambridge, Massachusetts. It was opened by Joyce Kalina (now Chopra) and Paula Kelley in 1958, when it was known as Club 47 (based on its then address, 47 Mount Auburn Street, also in Cambridge; it moved to its present location on Palmer Street in 1963), and changed its name to simply Passim in 1969. It adopted the present name in 1994; a combination of the earlier two names. In 1994 the venue also became a non-profit.

At its inception, it was mainly a jazz and blues club, but soon branched out to include ethnic folk, then singer-songwriter folk. Artists who have performed there include Joan Baez, Shawn Colvin, Bob Dylan, Tom Rush, Joni Mitchell, Suzanne Vega, Muddy Waters, Jimmy Buffett, John Mayer, Matt Nathanson, and Brian Webb. At times the club was a place for blues musicians such as Paul Butterfield and Elvin Bishop to play as well.

In the 1960s, the club (when known as Club 47) played a role in the rise of folk-rock music, when it began to book folk-rock bands whose music was unrelated to traditional folk, such as the Lovin' Spoonful. The club's importance to the 1960s Cambridge folk scene is documented extensively in Eric Von Schmidt's Baby, Let Me Follow You Down: The Illustrated Story of the Cambridge Folk Years. Scott Alarik described Club 47 as being "the hangout of choice for the new folkies" during that time.

Today there is a Passim School of Music program, which offers workshops and classes to teens and adults.

== Musicians ==
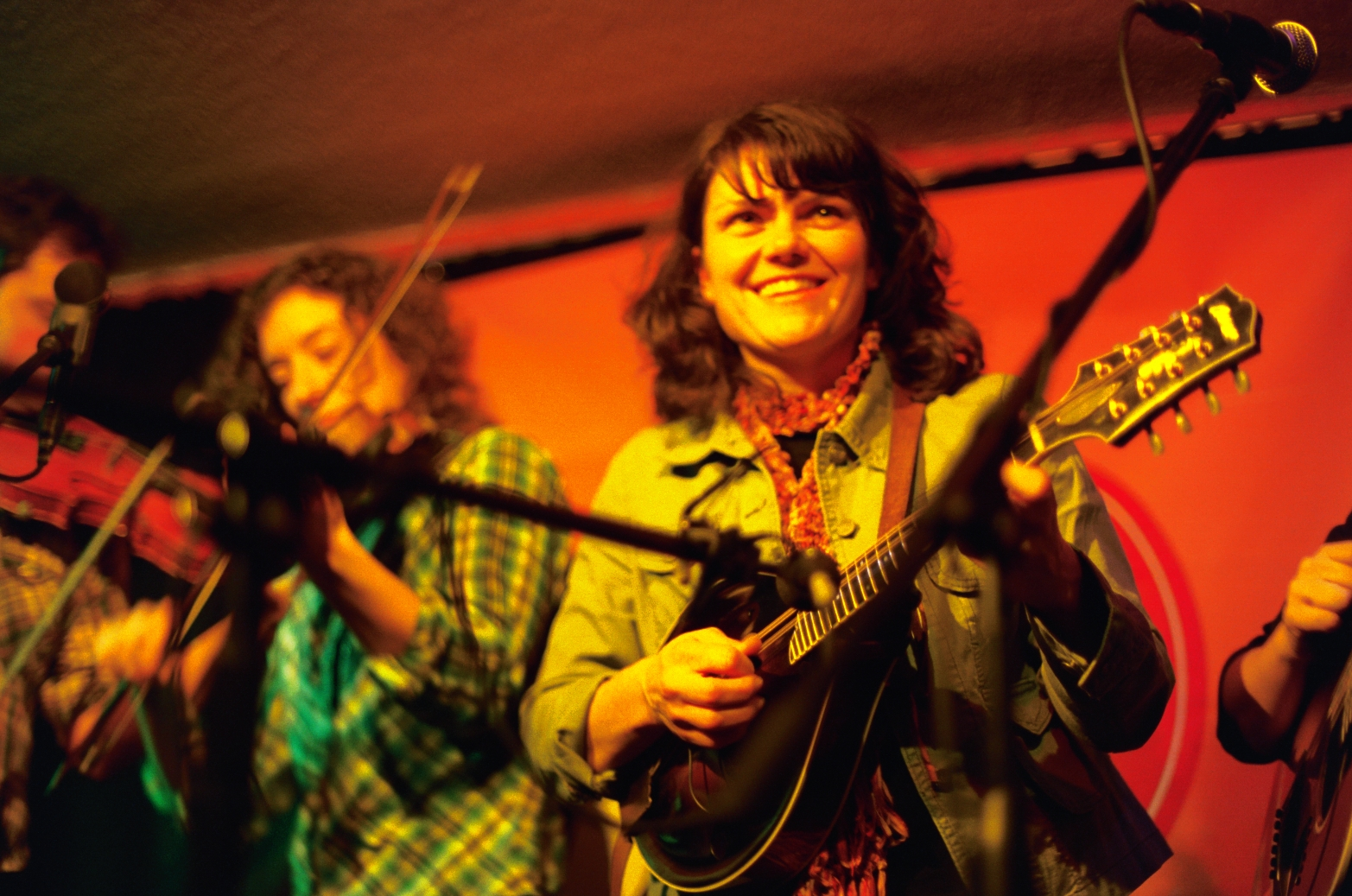
Uncle Earl at Club Passim in 2007

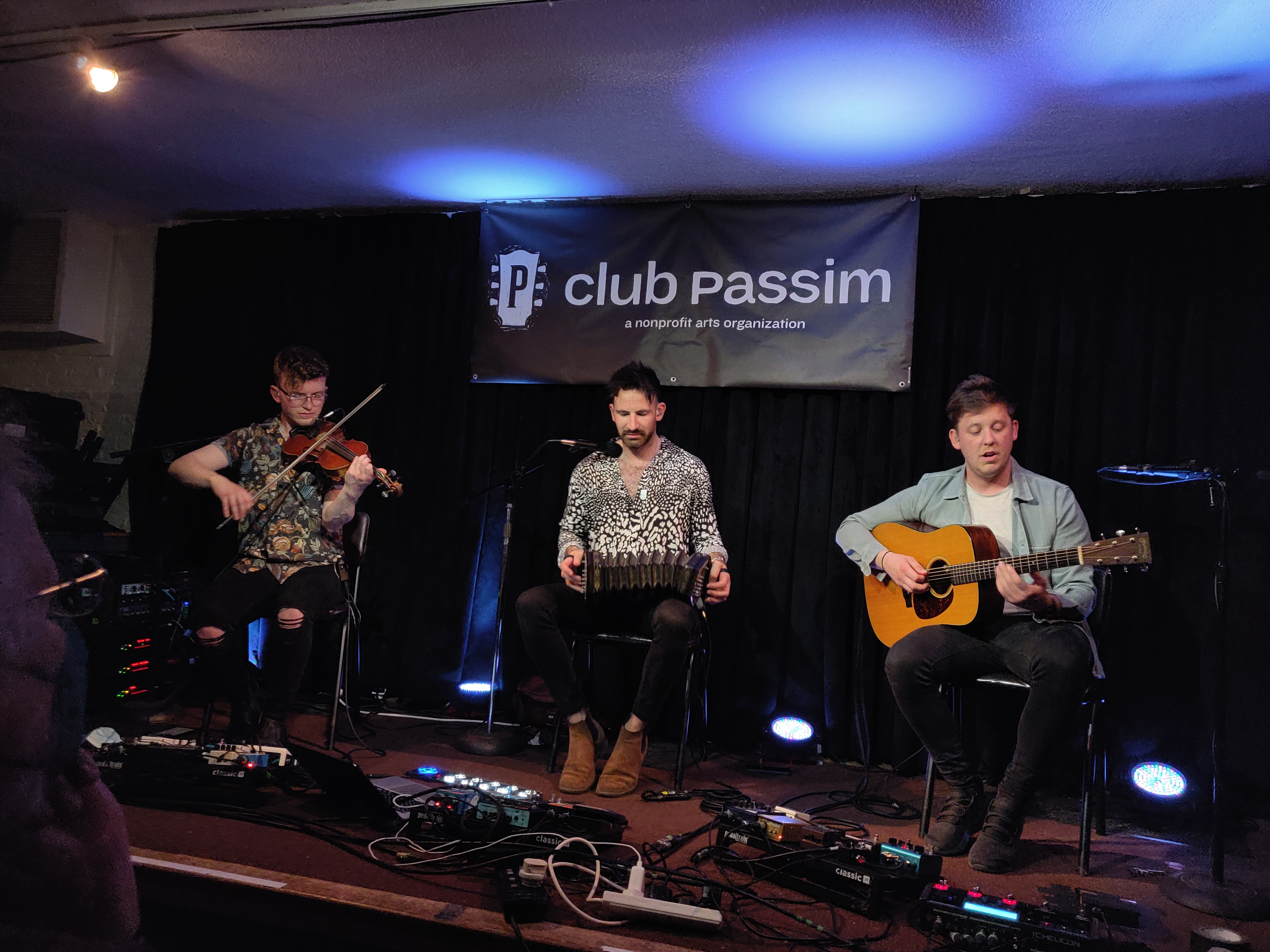
Talisk at Club Passim in 2022

Joan Baez described to Rolling Stone's Kurt Loder how she began performing at Club 47 in 1958 as a largely unknown Boston University student, playing on Tuesday nights as a means of providing entertainment because the jazz musicians who played there had Tuesday nights off; she would continue to perform regularly there through the early 1960s.

In 1961, Bob Dylan was said to have played at the club between sets for free so that he could say he had played at Club 47. Dylan: A Biography gives a detailed account of Dylan's first visit to Club 47, where he saw Carolyn Hester perform and performed between Hester's sets in the hopes of impressing club manager Paula Kelley.

Bonnie Raitt chose to attend Radcliffe College in Cambridge to be near Club 47, though the club closed temporarily after her first year as a student (1967).

Bill Staines mentions Club 47 in his autobiography, The Tour. He saw his first coffeehouse (event) performance there in 1962, as a sophomore in high school, and described Club 47 during the 1960s as "one of the premier folk venues in the country."

Bruce Springsteen was refused a gig at Club Passim.

== Dining at Club Passim ==
For some years, Club Passim shared space and featured food from the vegetarian and vegan restaurant Veggie Planet until the end of August 2014, when Veggie Planet closed. As of November 2024, brunch is served on Sunday mornings, as well as dinner to ticket holders for matinee and evening shows.

According to Vanity Fair, Facebook co-founder Chris Hughes and his husband Sean Eldridge met each other on a blind date at Veggie Planet inside Club Passim.
