= Catachresis =

Rhetorical misuse of a term

Catachresis (from Greek κατάχρησις, 'misuse'), originally meaning a semantic misuse or error, is also the name given to many different types of figures of speech in which a word or phrase is being applied in a way that significantly departs from conventional (or traditional) usage. Examples of the original meaning include using "militate" for "mitigate", "chronic" for "severe", "travesty" for "tragedy", "anachronism" for "anomaly", "alibi" for "excuse", etc. As a rhetorical figure, catachresis may signify an unexpected or implausible metaphor.

== Variant definitions ==
There are various characterizations of catachresis found in literature.

Definition	Example
Crossing categorical boundaries with words, because there otherwise would be no suitable word.	The sustainers of a chair being referred to as legs.
Replacing an expected word with another, half rhyming (or a partly sound-alike) word, with an entirely different meaning from what one would expect (cf. malapropism, Spoonerism, aphasia).	"I'm ravished!" for "I'm ravenous!" or for "I'm famished!" "They build a horse" instead of "They build a house".
The strained use of an already existing word or phrase.	"Tis deepest winter in Lord Timon's purse." – Shakespeare, Timon of Athens
The replacement of a word with a more ambiguous synonym (cf. euphemism).	Saying job-seeker instead of unemployed.

== Examples ==
Dead people in a graveyard being referred to as inhabitants is an example of catachresis.

Example from Alexander Pope's Peri Bathous, Or the Art of Sinking in Poetry:

Masters of this [catachresis] will say,

Mow the beard,
Shave the grass,
Pin the plank,
Nail my sleeve.

== Use in literature ==
Catachresis is often used to convey extreme emotion or alienation. It is prominent in baroque literature and, more recently, in dadaist and surrealist literature.

== Use in philosophy and criticism ==
In Jacques Derrida's ideas of deconstruction, catachresis refers to the original incompleteness that is a part of all systems of meaning. He proposes that metaphor and catachresis are tropes that ground philosophical discourse.

Postcolonial theorist Gayatri Spivak applies this word to "master words" that claim to represent a group, e.g., women or the proletariat, when there are no "true" examples of "woman" or "proletarian". In a similar way, words that are imposed upon people and are deemed improper thus denote a catachresis, a word with an arbitrary connection to its meaning.

== See also ==
- Cacography – Deliberate misspelling for comic effect
- Doublespeak – Language that deliberately disguises, distorts, or reverses the meaning of words
- Peter Piper Principle – The tendency to confuse two words that start with the same letter
- Skunked term – Word avoided due to problematic meanings

== Reading ==
- Ghiazza, Silvana (2007). Le figure retoriche. Bologna: Zanichelli. p. 350. ISBN 978-88-08-16742-2.
- Morton, Stephen (2003). Gayatri Chakravorty Spivak. London: Routledge. pp. 176. ISBN 0-415-22934-0.
- Smyth, Herbert Weir (1920). Greek Grammar. Cambridge, Massachusetts: Harvard University Press. p. 677. ISBN 0-674-36250-0.
