= Susan Levitt =

American astrologer and tarot card reader

Susan Levitt (born 1955) is a San Francisco astrologer and tarot card reader. Her publications include Taoist Astrology and The Complete Tarot Kit.

== Selected works ==
- —; Tang, Jean (1997). Taoist Astrology: A Handbook of the Authentic Chinese Tradition. Destiny Books. ISBN 978-0-89281-606-4.
- — (2000). Taoist Feng Shui. Destiny Books. ISBN 978-0-89281-723-8.
- — (2003). Teen Feng Shui: Design Your Space, Design Your Life. Bindu Books. ISBN 978-0-89281-916-4.
