= Lesbian Connection =

- Executive Director: Margy Lesher
- Categories: Lesbian
- Frequency: Bimonthly
- Circulation: 15,000 (in 2024)
- Publisher: Elsie Publishing Institute
- Founder: Ambitious Amazons
- Founded: 1974; 52 years ago
- Country: United States
- Based in: East Lansing, Michigan
- Website: lconline.org
- ISSN: 1081-3217
- OCLC: 10734023

Lesbian Connection (LC ) is an American grassroots network forum publication "for, by and about lesbians". Founded in 1974 by the lesbian-feminist collective Ambitious Amazons "to address the lack of safe, reliable, and targeted information channels for lesbian groups and individuals", it is the longest-running periodical for lesbians in the United States. LC is run by the Elsie Publishing Institute, a Michigan-based 501(c)(3) nonprofit corporation. In 2021, its total revenue was $1,412,061.

Lesbian Connection is published bimonthly and although it has a suggested yearly subscription, it is notable for offering it on a sliding scale basis. LC is made available to incarcerated women, and mailed free of charge upon request to those unable to make a financial contribution.

A unique aspect of LC is the fact that its content is largely submitted by its readers. News and announcements of interest to the lesbian community include current affairs, places to live, travel, women's music festivals, womyn's land, special events, gatherings, reviews, and obituaries. It features special topics, reprints of the comic strip Dykes to Watch Out For, and an annual "Contact Dykes" directory of national and international lesbians who volunteer to provide information about their local areas to lesbian visitors. It does not publish fiction, personal ads, or requests for pen pals.

From 1974 until 1995, the publication was folded and stapled in half to protect subscribers from harassment. LC circulation peaked in 2000 with 28,000 subscribers, and as of June 2024 it has 15,000 subscribers.

In 2014, LC received the "Jeanine Rae Award for the Advancement of Women's Culture" by Women in the Arts Inc., the non-profit organization responsible for the annual National Women's Music Festival.

Lesbian Connection has been instrumental in the building of national spiritual, political and social networks for lesbians.

Back issues from 1974 through 1989 have been fully digitized and are available to read online, for free, at JSTOR.

== See also ==
- LGBTQ-owned business
- List of lesbian periodicals
- List of lesbian periodicals in the United States
