= Martha McWhirter =

American commune founder

Martha White McWhirter
- Born: 17 May 1827; Jackson County, Tennessee, U.S.
- Died: 21 April 1904 (aged 76); Washington, D.C., U.S.
- Burial place: Rock Creek Cemetery; Washington, D.C., U.S.
- Occupations: women advocate, motivator, right activists, religious leader
- Organization: Belton Woman's Commonwealth
- Notable work: Woman's Commonwealth
- Title: leader of the Woman's Commonwealth of Belton
- Term: 1880s - 1904
- Predecessor: first established
- Successor: Fannie Holtzclaw

Martha White McWhirter (17 May 1827 – 21 April 1904) was an American religious leader and advocate for women. She was the founder and leader of Woman's Commonwealth in Belton, Texas.

== Early life ==
McWhirter was born in Gainesboro, Tennessee, US. At the age of sixteen she joined the Methodist church; very devout in her beliefs she became an active member within her home town congregation. When she turned eighteen she married attorney and farmer George McWhirter, having promised her mother to marry at that age. In 1855 she decided to move to Bell County, Texas. They settled in Salado Creek near what is now known as Armstrong. After celebrating ten years of marriage they relocated to Belton, Texas where George McWhirter operated a store and had an interest in a flour mill.

== Union established ==
Martha and her husband helped establish the Interdenominational Union Sunday School at Belton and acquired a Methodist congregation in 1870. She also led a weekly women's prayer group, hosted in the members homes. Two of her children died, followed by her brother's death in 1866, which caused her to believe she was being chastised by God. After a prayerful night she had a vision that caused her to be sanctified and filled with Holy Spirit.

After the vision, she shared her revelation with the women in the prayer groups she led. Many were unhappy in their domestic affairs and began praying for sanctification. She accused George McWhirter of improper advances towards a servant girl, and claimed she received a revelation that the women should separate themselves from the un-devout. She advised her followers to perform their household duties, while minimizing social interactions with their husbands, who were physically abusing them. She counseled them to abstain from sexual relationships with their husbands. Over time, the women began to leave their homes, and to run their own businesses, selling dairy products, working as domestic servants, running a hostel and doing laundry.

== Martha and George affairs ==
The McWhirter house began to fill up with the Sanctified Sisters from different destinations, George McWhirter and Martha permanently separated themselves and then Martha built a house for homeless sisters using one among his lots without George's permission. Later she claimed to have brought money during their marriage giving her the moral right in the properties and George did not interfere when the sisters continued building houses even as being very angry with Martha and had to defend her from critical towns people and the thought of her being an estranged wife. He later died in 1887 leaving her his estate he had built.

While still living with George before their quarrel she was not involved in asking George for household money, she was trading baked goods, butter and eggs and was the financial planner of the Woman's Commonwealth she involved her followers in a variety of enterprises making their group financially secure in a relatively short period of time. The 'Sanctificationists economic' had helped then successfully dissipate much of the town's unfriendly and aggressive behaviours, Martha later became the first woman in the City Trade Union to be elected to the Board of Trade and had assisted with contributions of community funding to help attracts a railroad to Belton making her name to appear in the cornerstone of Belton opera house.

== Battered Women's Movement in Texas ==
In 1875 Martha opened the first shelter for refuges in Belton, Texas delivering services for battered wives thrives from the 1890s and was the founder of religious Sanctificationist group that stands for women should not be compelled to live without sanctified or an brutal husband and women's who followed her attempts to lives husband's who were alcoholic and batterers.

== Women Commonwealth in Belton ==
The Women's Commonwealth of Belton came to exist in 1870s/1880s organized by Martha.

The Woman's Commonwealth of Belton was financially independent and administratively during the 1880s and thought Belton community had blamed Martha for the various separations and divorces. The Women's Commonwealth averaged around thirty which are children and women mostly, the Commonwealth was popular and became accepted for two decades, the women in the Commonwealth incorporated in 1902 as the Woman's Commonwealth of Washington. Martha continuously leading the Woman's Commonwealth even and before the members retires from business in 1899 and had bought a place in Mount Pleasant, Maryland and Washington.

Martha died in 1904 and Fannie Holtzclaw, a fellow proclaimed the Women's Commonwealth's as it leader and the Commonwealth endured till 1983 their last member died.

== Personal life ==
George McWhirter and Martha McWhirter had twelve children, of which six survived to adulthood.

== Bibliography ==
- Pierce Garrison, "A Woman's Community in Texas. Charities Review, November 1893.
- Eleanor James, "Martha White McWhirter (1827–1904)," in Women in Early Texas, ed. Evelyn M. Carrington (Austin: Jenkins, 1975).
- Eleanor James, "The Sanctificationists of Belton," American West, Summer 1965
- Melissa Johnson, "Sanctified Sisters," Texas Historian, November 1974. Jayme A.
- Sokolow and Mary Ann Lamanna, "Women and Utopia: The Woman's Commonwealth of Belton," Southwestern Historical Quarterly 87 (April 1984)
- Gwendolyn Wright, "The Woman's Commonwealth," Architectural Association Quarterly 6 (1974)

== Sources ==
- Sokolow, Jayme A.; Lamanna, Mary Ann (1984). "Women and Utopia: The Woman's Commonwealth of Belton, Texas". The Southwestern Historical Quarterly. 87 (4): 371–392. ISSN 0038-478X.
- "More Than Petticoats: Remarkable Texas Women by Greta Anderson, 2002". Guilford, CT: TwoDot. 2002. Archived from the original on 2020-11-23 – via Questia.
