= Sensational spelling =

Non-standard spelling for effect

Sensational spelling is the deliberate spelling of a word in a non-standard way for effect.

== Branding ==
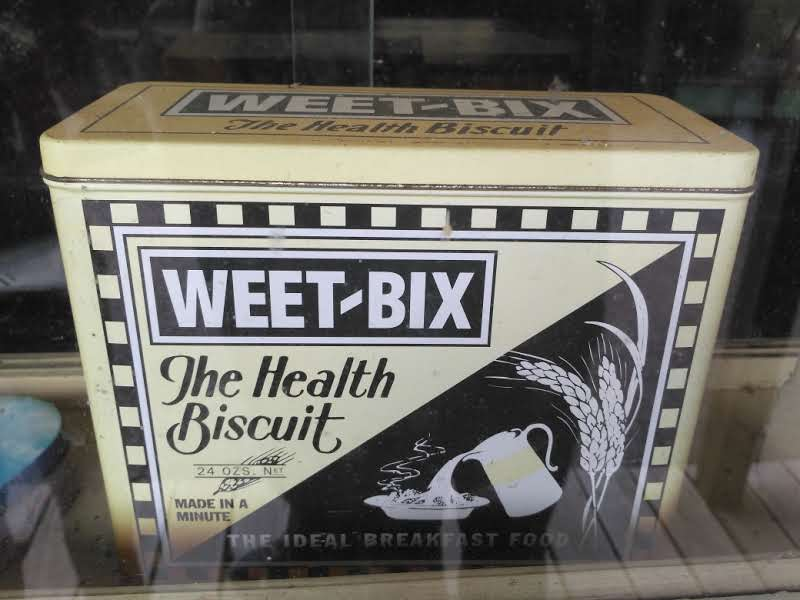
Weet-Bix branding

Sensational spellings are common in advertising and product placement. In particular, brand names such as Krispy Kreme Doughnuts (crispy cream), Weet-Bix (wheat, with bix being derived from biscuits), Blu-ray (blue), Kellogg's Froot Loops (fruit) or Hasbro's Playskool (school) may use unexpected spellings to draw attention to or trademark an otherwise common word.

== In popular music ==
Some bands in the mid-1960s (e.g. the Byrds and the Monkees) adopted sensational spelling. The Turtles successfully resisted an effort by their label, White Whale Records, to name them "the Tyrtles". Although similar, the Beatles is a word play that fuses 'beat' and 'beetles'.

Other examples include Def Leppard ("deaf leopard") and Led Zeppelin, in which "lead" was deliberately misspelled to make clear it is pronounced /lɛd/ (as in the metal lead) rather than the other pronunciation of "lead", /liːd/ (as in "lead singer", "lead guitarist", etc.)

== See also ==
- Cacography
- Catachresis
- Eye dialect
- Inventive spelling, the use of unconventional spellings in language learning
- Lolcat
- Ough (orthography) § Spelling reforms
- Satiric misspelling
- Spelling reform
- Typographical error
- Typosquatting
