= Coffeehouse (event) =

Social fundraising event

A coffeehouse is a social event, often held to raise funds for and/or generate awareness of a social cause or other event.

The name "coffeehouse" is derived from the limited menu which is typically available at the social event: coffee is usually the featured beverage, together with other non-alcoholic beverages such as soda, juice and tea. Desserts and snack foods may round out the menu.

Folk music and other acoustic concerts are the primary activity at many coffeehouses. Other coffeehouses allow patrons to sing, dance, read poetry, perform stand-up comedy, or demonstrate other talents as entertainment during the event. Still other coffeehouses feature lectures and presentations to raise awareness about social issues such as political oppression, food/freshwater shortages, and/or outbreaks of disease in various countries. Some coffeehouses may facilitate other activities, such as a mass letter writing campaign or signing petitions.

Some coffeehouses have free admission, but others require a small entrance fee. If money is collected as an entrance fee, it is often donated in whole or in part to the social cause, after covering expenses.

Coffeehouses are often sponsored by a permanent, semicommercial coffeehouse venue, such as the well-known Club Passim and Caffe Lena. Churches, non-profits, school groups, and other private groups also sponsor coffee houses in church meeting rooms, colleges, and high schools. In particular, schools often sponsor coffeehouses to allow students to socialize in an explicitly non-alcoholic environment.

== See also ==
- English coffeehouses in the 17th and 18th centuries
- Fika
- House concert
- Salon (gathering)
- Social center
- Stammtisch
- Tertulia
- Third place
- Viennese coffee house
