= Male-as-norm principle =

Feminist principle

In feminist theory, male-as-norm principle is the belief that grammatical and lexical devices such as the use of the suffix -ess (as in actress) specifically indicating the female form, together with the use of man to mean "human" and similar phenomena, promote and reinforce the perception that the male category is the norm, and that corresponding female categories are tangential and thus less important. The idea became prominent in 20th-century feminist linguistics, especially through scholars who argued that English encodes patriarchal assumptions by treating the male category as the linguistic norm.

The principle of male-as-norm and the relation between gendered grammar and the way in which its respective speakers conceptualize their world has received attention in varying fields, from philosophy to psychology and anthropology, and has fueled debates over linguistic determinism and gender inequality.

Feminists believe that the underlying message of the principle is that women speak a less legitimate language that both sustains and is defined by the subordination of the female gender as secondary to the accepted male-biased normative language. By regarding women's language as deficient relative to men's, it has been assumed that women's language is imperfect. Subsequent research by feminist advocates, particularly in discourse analysis, has maintained and qualified systematic male bias. In practice, grammatical gender exhibits a systematic structural bias that has made masculine forms the default for generic, non-gender-specific contexts. The male-as-norm principle claims that the male linguistic bias works to exclude and ignore women, diminish the female experience, and determine that female ideas or forms are unfit to represent many social categories.

== Historical development ==
=== Shift from sexual hierarchy to sexual binary (1800s) ===
Since the eighteenth century, the dominant view of sexual difference has been that of two stable, incommensurable, and opposite sexes on which the political, economic, and cultural lives of men and women are based, and social order is sustained. Contrary to modern discourse, "the dominant discourse construed the male and female bodies as hierarchically, vertically, ordered versions of one sex" rather than as "horizontally ordered opposites, as incommensurable."

=== Mid-20th century ===
==== Simone de Beauvoir ====
In 1949, the French existentialist Simone de Beauvoir published her book The Second Sex, in which she described two concepts that would later be developed in the fields of linguistics and psychology and become the basis for the male-as-norm principle in second-wave feminism. de Beauvoir writes that man is regarded as "both the positive and the neutral," foreshadowing the study of markedness, or the linguistic distinction between the "marked" and "unmarked" terms of an opposition. Specifically, "the notion that the typical contrast between opposites… is not symmetric." Instead, the contrast between oppositions is often asymmetric, meaning "the positive, or unmarked, term can be neutralized in meaning to denote the scale as a whole rather than just the positive end; but the negative, or marked, term can denote just the negative end". Unaffixed masculine or singular forms are taken to be unmarked in contrast to affixed feminine or plural forms.

de Beauvoir goes on to write that "there is an absolute human type, the masculine... Thus humanity is male", and the neutralizing of man to include woman is no longer her subject, rather the masculinizing of the whole human species to exclude woman—or at least to otherize her. Thus, introducing her second concept and foreshadowing the psychological concept of prototypicality and the development of the prototype theory in the 1970s. "The prototype theory is a model of graded categorizations, where some members of a category are more central than others. A prototype helps to explain the meaning of a word by resembling to the clearest exemplar". "All members of a category do not have equal status in the mind of the human perceiver; some members are instead perceived as more equal—or more prototypical—than other members… Like the prototypical member of any category, the male is taken to be the cognitive reference point, the standard, for the category of human being; and like the non-prototypical members of any category, the female is taken to be a variation on that prototype, a less representative example of the human species".

==== Luce Irigaray ====
Just as Simone de Beauvoir had done in recent decades, French feminist and literary scholar Luce Irigaray centered her ideas regarding the male-as-norm principle on the idea that women as a whole are otherized by systematic gender inequality, particularly through gendered language and how female experience and subjectivity are defined by variation from a male norm; through opposition in a phallocentric system where language is deliberately employed as a method of protecting the interests of the phallus and subliminally affirming his position as norm. Irigaray affirms that the designation of women as an inferior version of men, an aberrant variation from the male norm, is reflected throughout Western history and philosophy. In this tradition of inequality, women are measured against a male standard, seen in comparison as lacking, complementary, or the same. She asserts that any perception of difference between the two genders is an illusion. "Where women are not the same as men, they fail to exist altogether."

==== Dale Spender ====
Dale Spender claims that "patriarchy is a frame of reference, a particular way of classifying and organizing the objects and events of the world". The idea is that humans use language to classify and organize the world, and through this, we can manipulate reality. In this way, if our language is systematically flawed or rests on an understructure of invalid rules, then we are misled and deceived at a fundamental perceptual level. The rules by which we make meaning, ones intrinsically associated with language, had to be invented and defined. These linguistic rules establish our frame of reference, order, and the grounds from which we interpret and comprehend reality. Spender explains that these rules become self-validating and self-perpetuating over time, regardless of the validity of the beliefs and/or interpretations on which they are founded.

Spender claims that the semantic rule of the male as the norm may appear ineffectual in producing the purported significant social impact concluded by many feminists; however, this is part of why the rule is so pervasive and superlatively harmful in the construction of our perceptions of gender. As long as this rule remains central to gendered languages, users of these languages will continue to classify the world on the premise that males are the standard, normal being, and that those who are not male will be considered deviant. Speakers will continue to divide humanity into two unfairly biased parts. "By arranging the objects and events of the world according to these rules we set up the rationale, and the vindication, for male supremacy".

==== Gerda Lerner ====
Over the course of her career, feminist historian Gerda Lerner focused on patriarchal power and the history of women's subordination. She provided insights into the historical and contemporary significance of the male-as-norm principle by examining gender stratification across societies throughout human history, as reflected in language. She was one of the founders of the field of women's history and played a major role in developing women's history curricula.

In her 1986 book The Creation of Patriarchy, Lerner addressed how men have historically appropriated the major symbols of female power, constructed religions around "the counterfactual metaphor of male procreativity", and have "redefined female existence in a narrow and sexually dependent way", She explained that the metaphors for gender, created and promoted by men, have "expressed the male as norm and the female as deviant; the male as whole and powerful, the female as unfinished, mutilated, and lacking in autonomy", According to Lerner, men have constructed, explained, and defined the world in their own terms and have placed themselves at the center of discourse.

Lerner explained how men, by establishing male-centered language and discourse as the norm, have in turn demanded an androcentric perspective, necessitated the conceptualization of women as less than men, and have distorted the definition of woman to the degree that their experiences, autonomy, and viewpoints have been lost to modern consideration. In turn, men have come to believe that their experiences, viewpoints, and ideas represent all of human experience and thought. She concluded that, as long as men are unable to recognize the female perspective and believe that they have the only legitimate human experience, they will be unable to define and understand reality accurately.

== Modern perspectives ==
=== Sue Wilkinson ===
Sue Wilkinson, a professor of Feminist and Health Studies from Loughborough University, wrote in 1997 that there are distinct theoretical traditions in feminism that assert women's inferiority, two of which are rooted in the idea of the male-as-norm principle. First, psychology has mismeasured women throughout its history by taking a male-as-norm perspective, which categorizes females as deviant; or, in the words of Simone De Beauvoir, the science of psychology has systematically "otherized" women.

Wilkinson also sees women's inferiority asserted through psychologists seeking a different perspective, the female perspective, by listening to women's voices and drawing on and feeding back into preconceived ideas regarding female moral and cognitive processes as they differ from those of males. Wilkinson writes that the question of sex differences should be reconstructed and that masculinity and femininity as fundamental categories need to be dismantled.

=== Jeannine Hill Fletcher ===
In her book Motherhood as Metaphor: Engendering Interreligious Dialogue, theologian Jeannine Hill Fletcher notes that scripture and Christian theological writings have presented theological anthropology from a male-as-norm perspective due to the predominance of male theologians and philosophers. She notes that this has had disastrous effects on the lives of women and on the valuation of the female perspective, and, consequently, the history of Christian theology has missed opportunities to develop new understandings of what it means to be human.

== In law ==
=== Lucinda Finley ===
Lucinda Finley is the Frank G. Raichle Professor of Trial and Appellate Advocacy at the University of Buffalo and has a research focus on tort law, gender issues, and feminist legal theory. Finley argues that although the law is seen to be objective and neutral, laws have been created by men and legal language has been defined by men; therefore, laws which purport to be neutral are reflective of the male gaze. Finley suggests that this further perpetuates the idea of male as norm and women as outsiders of this norm.

=== Rosemary Hunter ===
Rosemary Hunter is a professor of law and socio-legal studies at the University of Kent and is currently researching feminist judging. Hunter argues that legal practice is still a place where being male is the norm, culturally. She suggests women in law are associated with irrationality, while men in law are associated with disembodied reason. She also suggests that women are considered "outsiders" because female lawyers are forcibly sexualized.

== See also ==
- Honorary male
- Manosphere
- Alternative spellings of woman
