= Teh =

Internet slang neologism

Teh is an Internet slang neologism most frequently used as an English article, based on a common typographical error of "the". Teh has subsequently developed grammatical usages distinct from the. It is not common in spoken or written English outside technical or leetspeak circles, but when spoken, it is pronounced /tɛ/, /tə/, or /teɪ/.

== Usage ==
Teh originates from the common typo of the word the, which might both occur and remain uncorrected when a person was typing rapidly prior to the widespread availability of autocorrect helper applications, and has become conventionalized in a variety of contexts.

In addition, it is a standard feature of leetspeak and can be used ironically or to mock someone's lack of "techie" knowledge or skills, as an insult, or to reinforce a group's elitism (cf. eye dialect).
