= Satiric misspelling =

Deliberate misspelling for rhetorical purposes

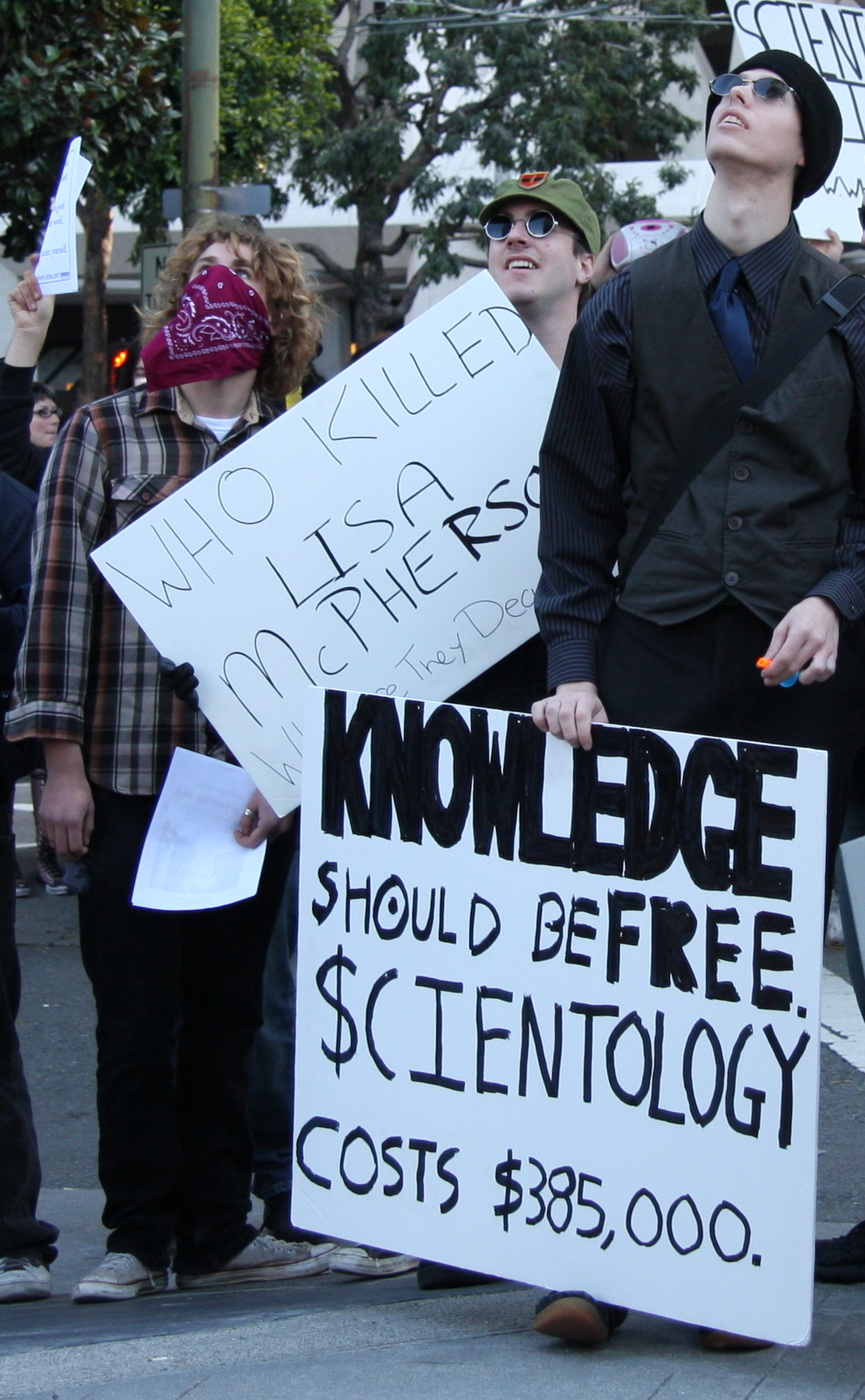
2008 protest against the Church of Scientology, spelling the organization's name with a dollar sign instead of an "S"

A satiric misspelling is the intentional misspelling of a word, phrase, or name for rhetorical effect. This can be achieved through techniques such as intentional malapropism (e.g. replacing erection for election), enallage (using incorrect grammar for effect, e.g., "we was robbed!"), or simply replacing one letter or symbol for another (e.g., using k instead of c), or symbol ($ instead of s).

Satiric misspelling is common today in informal writing on the Internet but also appears in serious political writing aimed at critiquing or opposing the status quo.

== K replacing c ==
=== In political writing ===
Replacing the letter c with k in the first letter of a word was used by the Ku Klux Klan during its early years in the mid-to-late 19th century. The concept is continued today within the group. For something similar in the writing of groups opposed to the KKK, see § KKK replacing c or k, below.

In the 1960s and early 1970s in the United States, the Yippies sometimes used Amerika rather than America in referring to the United States. According to Oxford Dictionaries, it was an allusion to the Russian and German spellings of the word and intended to be suggestive of fascism and authoritarianism.

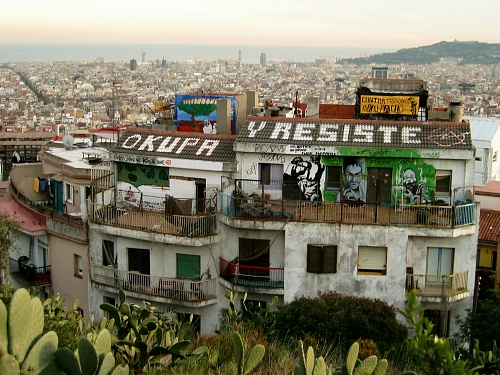
Barcelona squat and anarchist center, labeled "OKUPA Y RESISTE"

A similar usage in Italian, Spanish, Catalan and Portuguese is to write okupa rather than ocupa (often on a building or area occupied by squatters), referring to the name adopted by okupación activist groups. It stems from a combination of English borrowings with k in them to those languages, and Spanish anarchist and punk movements which used "k" to signal rebellion.

=== In humor ===
Replacing "c" with "k" was at the center of a Monty Python joke from the Travel Agent sketch. Eric Idle's character has an affliction that makes him pronounce the letter C as a B, as in "blassified" instead of "classified". Michael Palin asks him if he can say the letter K; Idle replies that he can, and Palin suggests that he spell words with a K instead of C. Idle replies: "what, you mean, pronounce 'blassified' with a K? [...] Klassified. [...] Oh, it's very good! I never thought of that before! What a silly bunt!"

=== KKK replacing c or k ===
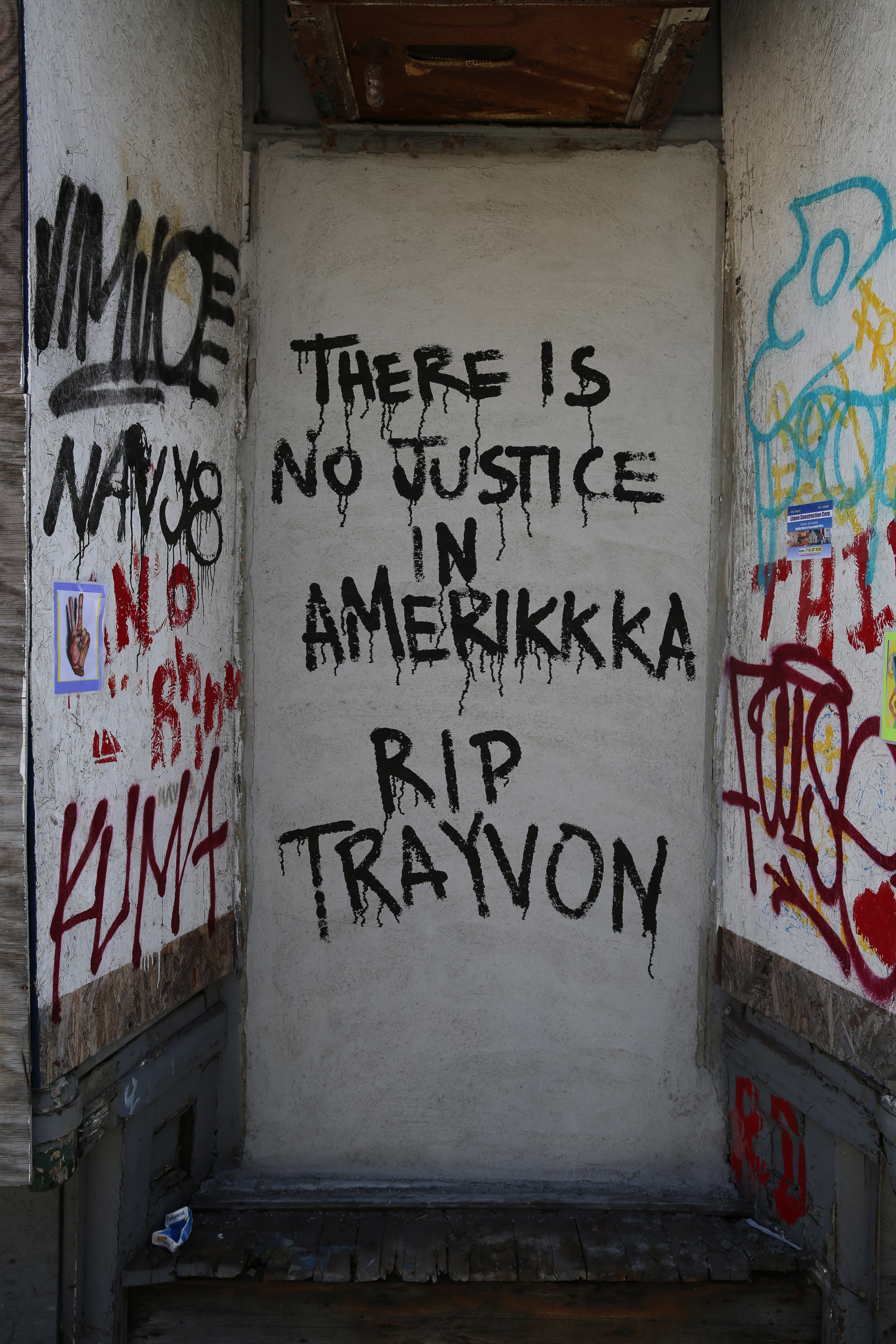
"No Justice in Amerikkka" graffiti from 2013, referencing the killing of Trayvon Martin

A common satiric usage of the letters KKK is the spelling of America as Amerikkka (or AmeriKKKa), alluding to the Ku Klux Klan, referring to underlying racism in American society. The earliest known usage of Amerikkka recorded in the Oxford English Dictionary is in July 1970, in an African-American magazine called Black World.

The spelling Amerikkka came into greater use after the 1990 release of the gangsta rap album AmeriKKKa's Most Wanted by Ice Cube. The letters KKK have been inserted into several other words and names, to indicate similar perceived racism, oppression or corruption. Examples include:

- Republikkkan (U.S. Republican Party)
- Demokkkrat (U.S. Democratic Party)
- KKKapitalism (capitalism)
- David DuKKKe (David Duke), former Grand Wizard of the Ku Klux Klan, candidate for United States Senate, candidate for Governor of Louisiana, and antisemitic conspiracy theorist

=== Other uses ===
American rapper Tupac Shakur used the spelling "Amerikaz" for "America's" in his song titled "2 of Amerikaz Most Wanted" featuring Snoop Dogg, released in 1996 as part of his album All Eyez On Me (which includes another satirical misspelling, the use of "eyez" instead of "eyes").

== Currency signs ==
Currency symbols like €, $ and £ can be inserted in place of the letters E, S and L respectively to indicate plutocracy, greed, corruption, or the perceived immoral, unethical, or pathological accumulation of money. For example:

- Bu$h (for George W. Bush, George H. W. Bush, or the Bush family)
- Congre$$ (for United States Congress)
- Co$ or $cientology (for the Church of Scientology): see also Scientology controversies.
- Di$ney and Di$neyland (for The Walt Disney Company and Disneyland): see also Criticism of the Walt Disney Company and Disneyland § Tickets
- E$$o (for Esso): Used by the UK-based Stop Esso campaign encouraging people to boycott Esso, in protest against Esso's opposition to the Kyoto Protocol.
- €urope (for Europe)
- Ke$ha (singer-songwriter): adopted the dollar sign in her name while financially struggling as an ironic gesture.
- Micro$oft, M$, M$FT (for Microsoft): see also Criticism of Microsoft
- $ony (for Sony)
- United $tates, U$, U$A (for the United States)

== Word-in-word ==
Occasionally a word written in its orthodox spelling is altered with internal capital letters, hyphens, italics, or other devices so as to highlight a fortuitous pun. Some examples:

- After the controversial 2000 United States presidential election, the alleged improprieties of the election prompted the use of such titles as "pResident" and "(p)resident" for George W. Bush. The same effects were also used for Bill Clinton during and after Clinton's impeachment hearings. These devices were intended to suggest that the president was merely the resident of the White House rather than the legitimate leader.
- The controversial United States law USA PATRIOT Act is sometimes called "USA PAT RIOT Act" or "(Pat)Riot Act" by its opponents. This is done to avoid using the common term Patriot Act, which implies the law is patriotic.
- Feminist theologian Mary Daly has used a slash to make a point about patriarchy: "gyn/ecology", "stag/nation", "the/rapist".
- In French, where con is an insulting word meaning "moron", the word conservateur (conservative) has been written "con-servateur", "con... servateur", or "con(servateur)". The American English term neo-con, an abbreviation of neo-conservative, becomes a convenient pun when used in French. In English, the first syllable of conservative can be emphasized to suggest a con artist.
- Filipino netizens gave Senator Ramon "Bong" Revilla Jr. the derisive nickname "MandaramBONG" (Filipino word for plunderer) to highlight allegations that he pocketed pork barrel funds through the use of fake non-government organizations.
- Jair Bolsonaro has been called BolsoNero, due to the 2019 Amazon rainforest wildfires and indifference to the COVID-19 pandemic.

== In internet memes ==
=== Lolcats ===
In the mid-2000s, lolcat image macros were captioned with deliberate misspellings, known as "lolspeak", such as a cat asking "I can haz cheezburger?" Blogger Anil Dash described the intentionally poor spelling and fractured grammar as "kitty pidgin".

=== "B" emoji replacing hard consonants ===
The negative squared letter B (🅱️; originally used to represent blood type B) can be used to replace hard consonants as an internet meme. This originates from the practice of members of the Bloods replacing the letter C with the letter B, but has been extended to any consonant. Common examples are:

- Ni🅱️🅱️a, replacing nigga. Some non-black people have been criticised for using this as if the taboo around the word did not apply.
- 🅱️loods for Bloods.
- 🅱️eter in a meme about Peter Griffin.

Extended usage of the emoji has led to developments in how it can be used. In contemporary usage (post-2017), the B emoji can replace any consonant that starts a word, or any plosive consonant (b, p, t, d, g, k) in the beginning of the stressed syllable.

=== Misspelled animal names ===
Various different instances of intentional misspellings of animal names have been made as internet memes. The mid-2000s lolcat memes used spellings such as kitteh for kitty.

The internet slang of DoggoLingo, which appeared around the same time, spells dog as doggo and also includes respelled words for puppy (pupper) and other animals such as bird (birb) and snake (snek). Respellings in DoggoLingo usually alter the pronunciation of the word.

== Other significant respellings ==
Along the same lines, intentional misspellings can be used to promote a specific negative attribute, real or perceived, of a product or service. This is especially effective if the misspelling is done by replacing part of the word with another that has identical phonetic qualities.

Journalists may make a politicized editorial decision by choosing to differentially retain (or even create) misspellings, mispronunciations, ungrammaticisms, dialect variants, or interjections.

The British political satire magazine Private Eye has a long-standing theme of insulting the law firm Carter-Ruck by replacing the R with an F to read Carter-Fuck. The law firm once requested that Private Eye cease spelling its name like that; the magazine then started spelling it "Farter-Fuck". Likewise, Private Eye often refers to The Guardian as The Grauniad, due to the newspaper's early reputation for typographical errors.

=== Backronyms ===
Plays on acronyms and initialisms are also common, when the full name is spelled out but one of the component words is replaced by another. For example, Richard Stallman and other Free Software Foundation executives often refer to digital rights management as "digital restrictions management", a reference to the tendency for DRM to stifle the end user's ability to reshare music or write CDs more than a certain number of times. Likewise, the National Security Agency is often referred to as the "National Surveillance Agency" and sometimes "National Socialist Agency" by opponents of its PRISM program, who view it as dystopian encroachment on personal privacy. The same goes for references to the Anti-Defamation League (ADL) as the "Apartheid Defense League", in order to highlight and criticize the organization's defense of the apartheid in Israel.

== See also ==
- Cacography
- Eye dialect
- Herstory
- Leet
- Play on words
- Pun
- Sensational spelling
- Womyn
