= British scientists (meme) =

Russian Internet meme

In modern Russian culture, "British scientists" (Russian: Британские учёные, Britanskiye uchyonyye) is a running joke used as an ironic reference to absurd news reports about scientific discoveries: "British scientists managed to establish that..." It has also become a Russian internet meme. A similar joke, "British research" (Chinese: 英国研究 yīngguó yánjiū), exists in Chinese-speaking countries.

== Description ==
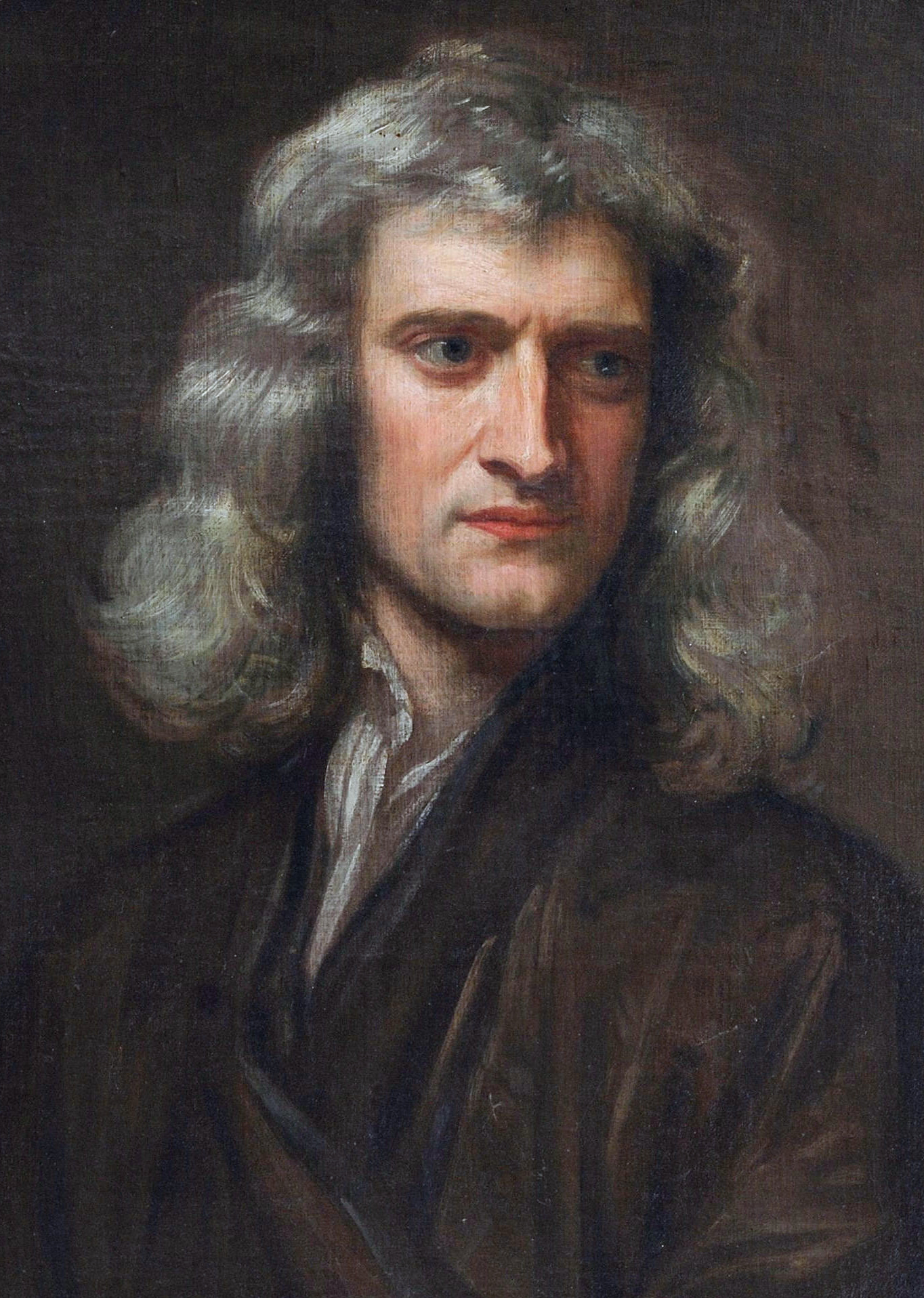
In the Russian internet popculture, Newton is not found among the top British scientists

The crowdsourced Russian internet subculture encyclopedia Lurkmore defined the term as "a synonym for researchers working on pseudoscientific projects that are bonkers, idiotic and have absolutely no practical value".

James Harkin wrote: "When they hear the phrase 'British scientists', Russians don't tend to think of Newton, Darwin or Faraday; nor do they think of Stephen Hawking or Peter Higgs. Instead, they are much more likely to think of psychologist Richard Stephens of Keele University, who determined that swearing can help reduce pain, or Olli Loukola of Queen Mary University of London, who has taught bumblebees how to play football".

Typical news about "Британские учёные" [Britanskiye uchyonyye, "British scientists"] report that they:

- found out that people start lying as early as at 6 years old
- debunked the myth that mice love cheese
- invented non-stick bubble gum
- designed an ideal sandwich
- developed a universal vaccine

== History ==
Lurkmore writes that the meme started proliferating somewhere in 2003–2004 and attributes its spreading to a Pleshner, a user of dirty.ru who had made multiple posts all over runet. However, Russian linguist Maksim Krongauz remarks that all discoveries of "British scientists" reported by Pleshner have already been published in Russian media earlier. During the peak of popularity of the meme there were several websites (british.powernet.ru, british-science.ru, etc.) dedicated to the revelations of "British scientists".

Krongauz writes that, as it goes with other internet memes, it is pointless to try to figure out why British, why not Japanese, nor American, not even English. The only thing is sure, he notes, that once the meme took off, it started to self-proliferate because journalists started putting slight spins on science news in its favor. For example, if there is a report about a British-American team, in the Russian version only British would be mentioned by nation, and of course, the title or the lede will most definitely say that British scientists did this or that. A similar opinion was expressed during a minipoll on what British scientists think about "British scientists" carried out in 2019 by the London-based Russophone Zima Magazine: popular media are routinely twisting the reports about scientific discoveries to make them clickbaity. For this reason Krongauz considers "British scientists" to be a special type of media virus, which not only thrives in reality but also slightly modifies it.

Internet statistics seems to corroborate the approximate date of the emergence of the meme: before 2004 the terms "английские ученые" [English scientists] and "британские ученые" [British scientists] appeared with about the same frequency, but since the second half of 2004 the British ones took the lead, with the gap ever increasing.

In 2015–2016 Russian popular science TV channel Science 2.0 [Наука 2.0] released a series of reports from England titled "British Scientists Have Proven..." [Британские ученые доказали] about real research projects that look weird or funny. Capitalizing on the meme, the channel suggests that the term is in fact similar to the concept of "mad scientist".

The founder of the Ig Nobel Prize, Marc Abrahams suggested to BBC News Russian that there is a rationale under the meme, which lies in a trait of British character: positive attitude to eccentricity. For this reason British scientists are not afraid to do and publish various kinds of eccentric research: sometimes it is simply funny, but sometimes this gives "a chance to do something really wonderful".

== British analogue ==
The British have a similar concept referring to trivial, useless research, "University of the Bleedin' Obvious", coined in 2009 by two editors of The Independent, Steve Connor and Jeremy Lawrence, in a review of this kind of research. The "groundbreaking" reports they listed include:

- Images of bikini-clad women make men more sexist
- The fitter you are, the longer you will live
- Hurrying makes people less attentive
- Binge drinkers are more likely to fall over

== See also ==
- Gulliver's Travels, the land of Laputa, where scientists were busy with various weird and utterly fruitless research, such as attempting to soften stones to use as pillows
- Ig Nobel Prize, annual satiric prize for unusual or trivial achievements in scientific research. There is a whole category:Ironic and humorous awards
- Junk science, spurious or fraudulent scientific data, research, or analysis
- Blue skies research, scientific research which seems to have no practical value
- Florida Man, alleged prevalence of people performing irrational or maniacal actions in the U.S. state of Florida
