= Padonkaffsky jargon =

Cant language

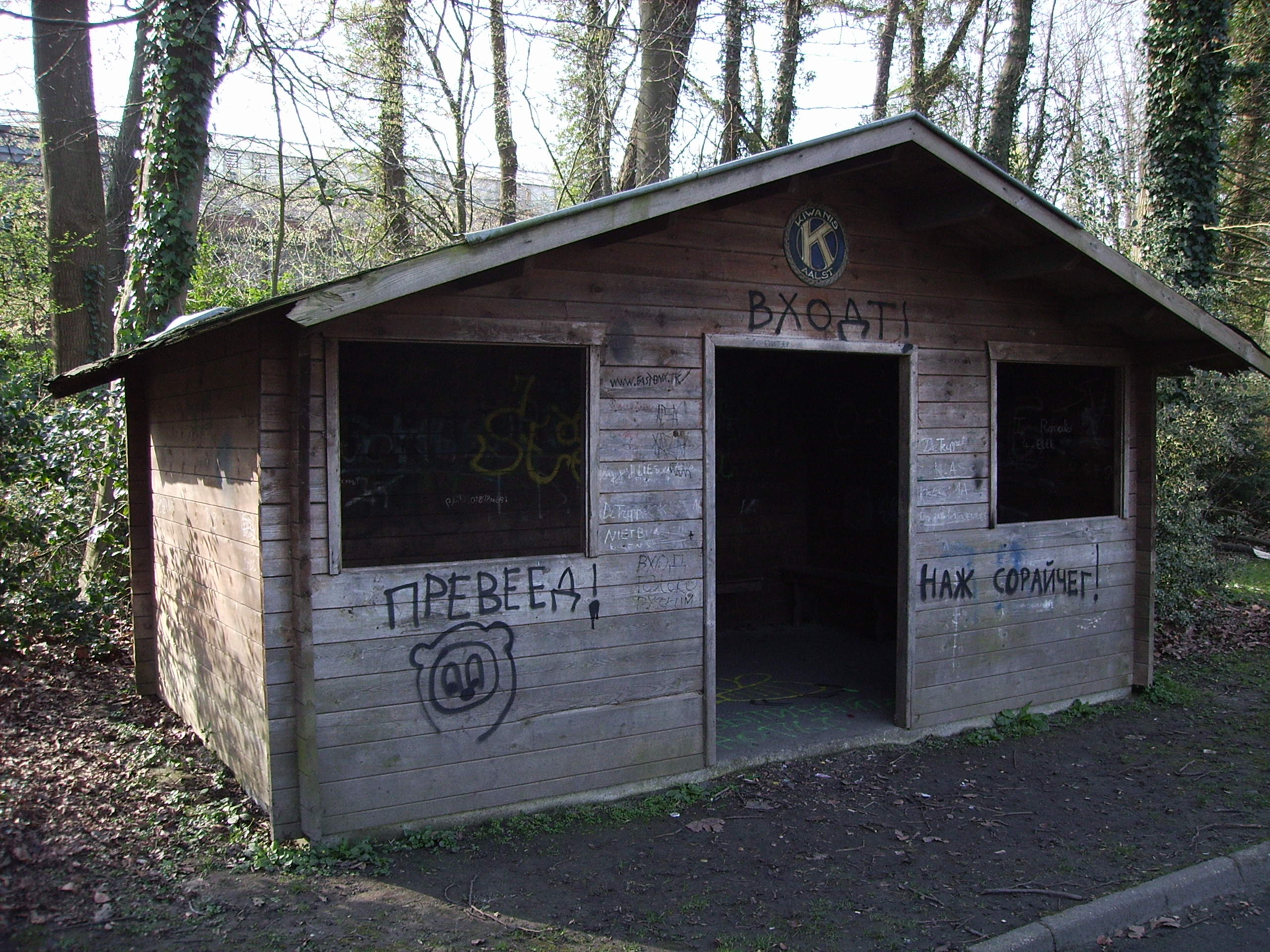
Padonkaffsky jargon used in graffiti in the city park of Aalst, Belgium From left to right, the text reads: превед! (preved!) – "hi", from "привет" (privet); входт (vkhodt) – "entrance", from "вход" (vkhod); наж сорайчег (nazh soraycheg) – "our shed", from "наш сарайчик" (nash saraychik); The Padonkaffsky spellings are pronounced virtually identically to the standard spellings due to Russian phonological rules

Padonkaffsky jargon (Russian: язык падонкафф, romanized: yazyk padonkaff), also known as Olbanian (олбанский, olbansky), is a slang developed by a Runet subculture called padonki (падонки). It started as an Internet slang language originally used in the Russian Internet community. It is a kind of eye dialect. Padonkaffsky jargon became so popular that Dmitry Medvedev jokingly suggested that Olbanian be taught in schools.

== Origin and etymology ==
The term Olbanian is an alteration of Albanian, although Albanian is not used to create Olbanian slang.

Learn Olbanian! (Russian: Учи олбанский!) is a catch phrase that was coined in a 2004 incident in LiveJournal when an English language user found a post written in Russian, which he didn't understand and was unable to translate. He asked what language was being used. He was jokingly told that the post was in Albanian. He questioned why people were posting messages in Albanian by saying:

Because? It's LIVEJOURNAL. An American website. Not an albanian; (#*!@()! site. Plus, being an American means that the rest of the world should have to cater to me. But that's just mypointofview.

In reaction to this comment, an Internet meme started, urging the English language user to Learn Albanian! and flooding him with email messages, text messages, and calls to his personal cell phone. Eventually, the English language user wrote an apology in Russian, explaining that he had mastered the Albanian language.

Since then, the request to "Learn Olbanian!" became a friendly response to anyone using incorrect grammar or when saying something that doesn't make sense.

An invitation to "Learn Olbanian!" was directed at Madonna in 2006, when in her blog she used an electronic translator to address her Russian fans and called them "Russian ventilators" by mistake (i.e. by confusing "fan (person)" and "fan (machine)", while the latter is ventilyator in Russian).

== Use and development ==
The language arose in 1997 among intellectuals who were developing and using LiveJournal and Russian FidoNet.

The language is based on sensational (mostly phonetic, but also counterphonetic) spelling of the Russian and Ukrainian languages often using profanity. It combines complex orthography with creative use of idioms and literary expression. It is often used to express disagreement, amusement, or to create political satire. It was popularized by the padonki subculture on websites like Udaff.com and Fuck.ru (currently defunct) created by entrepreneur Egor Lavrov and Konstantin Rykov, now a deputy of the Duma.

Padonkaffsky jargon is difficult to translate with a traditional dictionary because many of the misspellings also involve puns and cultural slang. Padonkaffsky language has gone mainstream and is common in Russian vernacular and popular culture.

== Rules ==
The unstressed letter ⟨о⟩ is replaced by ⟨а⟩, and sometimes the other way around; for example, албанский may become олбанский. The unstressed letters ⟨е⟩, ⟨и⟩, and ⟨я⟩ are also interchangeable. The consonant ⟨в⟩ may become ⟨ф⟩ or ⟨фф⟩, the suffix ⟨-ик⟩ becomes ⟨-ег⟩, ⟨жи⟩ becomes ⟨жы⟩, ⟨я⟩ becomes ⟨йа⟩, etc. Examples: превед (PREVED, from привет privet 'hi!'), аффтар afftar (from автор avtor 'author'), йад (from яд yad 'poison'), etc.

== See also ==
- Argot
- Internet slang
- Kashchenism
- Mat (Russian profanity)
