= Rykov =

Rykov is a surname. Notable people with the surname include:

- Alexei Rykov (1881–1938), Bolshevik revolutionary and Soviet politician
- Vladimir Rykov (born 1987), Russian professional football player
- Konstantin Rykov (born 1979), Russian politician
- Yegor Rykov (born 1997), Russian ice hockey player
