= Preved =

Meme on the Russian-speaking Internet

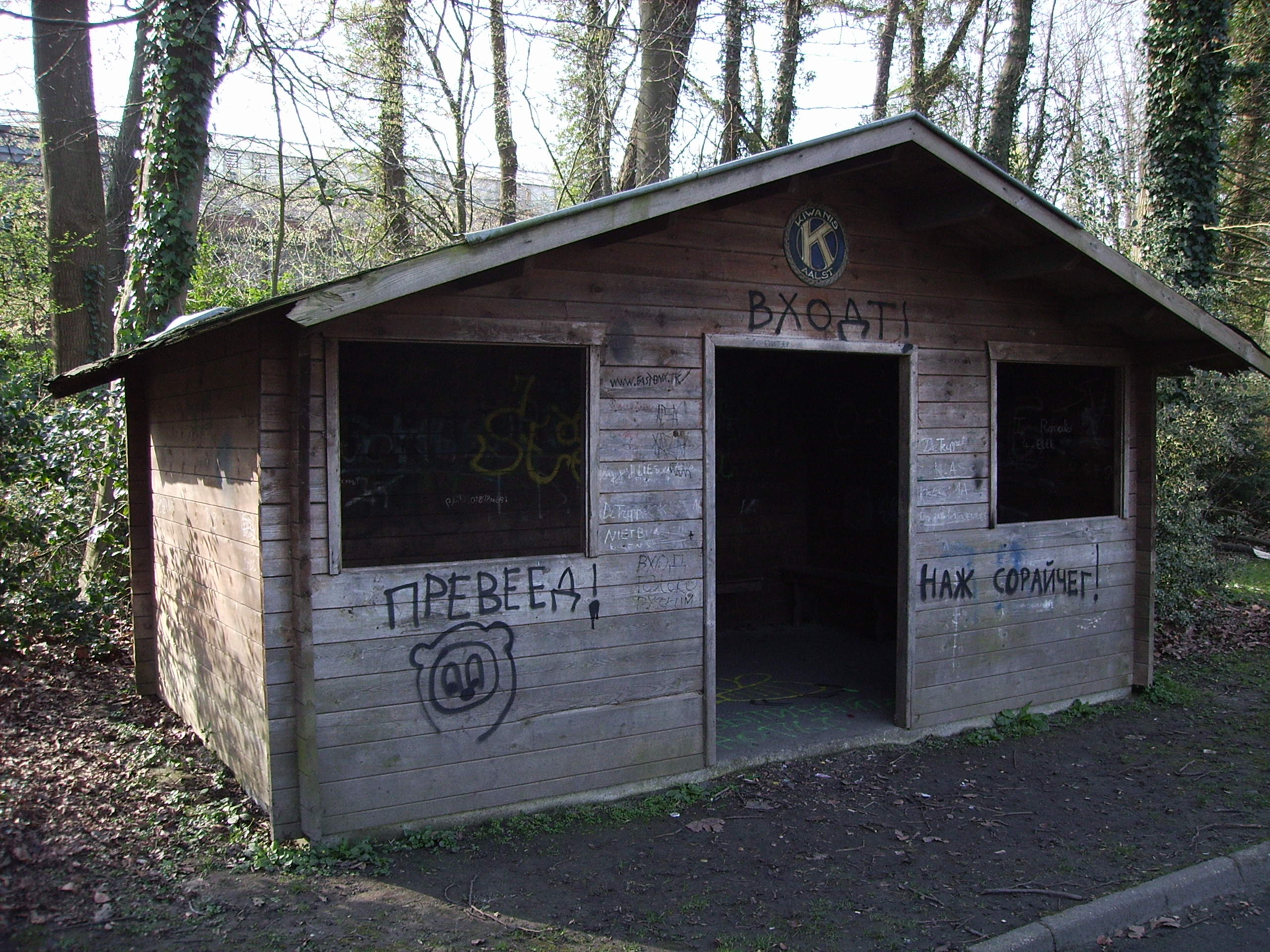
Padonkaffsky jargon used in graffiti in the city park of Aalst, Belgium (2007) From left to right, the text reads: превед! (preved!) – "hi", from "привет" (privet); входт (vkhodt) – "entrance", from "вход" (vkhod); наж сорайчег (nazh soraycheg) – "our shed", from "наш сарайчик" (nash saraychik); The Padonkaffsky spellings are pronounced virtually identically to the standard spellings due to Russian phonological rules, making them a kind of eye dialect.

Promotional poster for the Russian edition of Newsweek magazine features its chief editor Leonid Parfyonov crying "Preved" with the Preved bears flying on the background (c. 2007).

Preved (Russian: Преве́д) is a term used in the Padonkaffsky jargon, a meme in the Russian-speaking Internet which developed out of a heavily circulated picture, and consists of choosing alternative spellings for words for comic effect. The picture, a modified version of John Lurie's watercolor Bear Surprise, whose popularity was stoked by emails and blogs, features a man and a woman having sex in the clearing of a forest, being surprised by a bear calling "Surprise!" with its paws raised. In later Russian adaptations, the bear shouts "Preved!" (a deliberate misspelling of privet, приве́т – "hi!"). In keeping with a popular trend of image manipulation, the iconic bear — dubbed Medved (Russian: Медвед), a misspelling of медведь ("bear") — has been inserted into many other pictures where his appearance adds a new dimension to the joke.

The word and the bear image have found their way into the mainstream mass media, such as a poster for the Russian edition of Newsweek.

Eventually, it has become known that the author of the altered picture with the word "preved" was user Lobzz from site Dirty.ru, real name Roman Yatsenko. The authorship of the word itself is still unclear, although the "unfinished" version, "prevet" was traced to 2003.

Preved is identified by a specific pattern of alternative spelling which emerged from the word. In this pattern, voiceless consonants are replaced with their voiced counterparts, and unstressed vowels are interchanged pair-wise – a and o stand in for each other, as do e and i. The words уча́снег (uchasneg) (a misspelling of участник (uchastnik), "user" or "participant"), preved itself, and кагдила (kagdila) (a misspelling of как дела (kak dela), "how are you") illustrate this pattern.

The larger trend of alternative spellings, called "olbansky yazyk" ("Olbanian language", misspelled "Albanian") developed from the padonki movement which originated on sites such as udaff.com. That trend uses the opposite conversion from the Preved trend – voiced consonants are replaced with their voiceless counterparts (which are sometimes doubled). For vowels, o is replaced with a and e with i. For example, áвтор (ávtor, "author") would be spelled áффтар (áfftar) or áфтар (áftar). The latter exhibits a sort of eye dialect.

This meme has made its way to the American spotlight, as another reference of this popular term was used in a cartoon of Steve Jobs yelling this phrase in an image that was used in the mid to late 2000's as a custom recovery logo for devices such as the first-generation iPhone, the iPod Touch, and iPhone 3GS that was exclusive for the early jailbreak tools like PwnageTool. This image was spread all around social media in places like Reddit, and other small developer forums.

== "Medved" in politics ==
In Russian, MEDVED (Russian: МЕДВЕД) is an abbreviation of the name of the Interregional Unity Movement (Russian: Межрегиональное Движение Единство) - a pro-government movement that formed a faction in the 3rd State Duma (1999-2002), long before the appearance of the Internet meme. The movement's logo featured a brown bear. In 2002, the Interregional Unity Movement merged into the newly formed United Russia party. United Russia adopted the Unity bear logo, later changing its color from brown to white. This, along with the Internet meme, influenced the fact that the word "medved" is often associated with Dmitry Medvedev, President of Russia from 2008 to 2012.

During an internet conference with Russian President Vladimir Putin on 6 July 2006, during which all interested Runet users asked him questions through a Yandex portal, the question "PREVED, Vladimir Vladimirovich! How do you feel about MEDVED?" received the largest number of votes (28,424). This event played a significant role in the "Preved-Medved" meme gaining fame and popularity even among those who rarely use the Internet. In the end, the question was not asked to Putin (the organizers considered this and some other questions to be a flash mob); the question "How do you feel about the Medved' magazine?" was asked instead. Some representatives of non-Russian press took the original "Medved" question literally; in particular, Associated Press reportedly interpreted it as a reference to then-deputy prime minister Dmitry Medvedev.

== See also ==
- Eye dialect
