= Lurkmore =

Online encyclopedia focusing on Internet subcultures, folklore, and memes

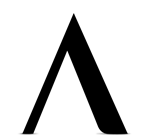
- Website type: Internet subculture and meme wiki
- Available in: Russian
- Owner: David Homak
- Website: lurkmore.to
- Registration: Not required
- Launched: July 30, 2007
- Current status: Offline (purposely)

Lurkmore or Lurkomorye (Russian: Луркоморье, a portmanteau of Lukomorye and the English online slang "lurk moar") was an informal Russian-language MediaWiki-powered online encyclopedia, based on the English-wiki website lurkmore.com, focusing on Internet subcultures, folklore, and memes. It was one of the most popular humor and internet meme-related websites of the Russian internet.

As of February 24, 2022 (the start of the Russian invasion of Ukraine), the website's content is no longer available, with only a black screen covering all its pages. Recently, the phrase "остановите войну", which translates to "stop the war" in Russian, written in blue and yellow (the colours of Ukraine's national flag), was added to the top of the black screen.

== Content and style ==
Lurkmore was started as a knowledge base of Internet memes centered on 2ch.ru, the first popular Russian-language imageboard. With time, the project evolved to encompass the broader Runet subculture. It has been called an "informal encyclopedia" about everything. Currently, Lurkmore comprises a wide range of articles, but a considerable share of them are still about Russian internet culture.

Lurkmore articles use a distinctive style, distinguishing themselves with a general informality, semiseriousness, sarcasm, the free use of foul language, and impudence, as well as by sharp criticism of the shortcomings of the considered phenomena. The articles are also characterized by a specific slang—"lurkoyaz" (луркояз)—consisting of Internet slang, assorted words used by padonki and Kashchenists, and Lurkmore's own neologisms.

== Rules and policies ==
The entire text of the Lurkmore policies page read as follows:

Our rules are very simple and comprehensible.

- Everything for the lulz.
- But facts come before the lulz.
- Do not lie.
- Be yourself.
- The Creator of the Internets is always right.

== Audience ==
A remarkable feature of the project is the concealment of IP addresses of anonymous participants in the editing history of articles for all users except administrators. The inscription of "Anonimus" is displayed instead of an IP address. The registered participants having a flag of the autoconfirmed participant also have an opportunity to leave any editing not under the name, and anonymously.

== Fleeting block in Russia ==
On 11 November 2012, the IP address of Lurkmore.to was added to the Russian Internet blacklist by decision of the Russian Federal Surveillance Service for Mass Media and Communications, making it inaccessible from most Russian ISPs. A Lurkmore.to owner told journalists that he had not received any communication from Roskomnadzor or the Federal Drug Control Service of Russia before the IP address was blacklisted. Lurkmore.to was removed from the blacklist on 13 November 2012 after the website administrators deleted two marijuana-related articles. In 2015 Homak declared on his Facebook profile that the project will be frozen and become a "culture memorial" due to increasing pressure from Roskomnadzor and other law enforcement agencies, and he left Russia due to general development of situation in the country.

== Awards ==
- Finalist of the 2008 ROTOR competition in the humor site of the year category.
- Winner of the 2009 ROTOR competition in the humor site of the year category.
- Winner of the 2011 AntiROTOR competition.
- Winner of the 2012 ROTOR competition in the archive site of the year category.
- Winner of four 2012 AntiRotor nominations.
- Winner of the Golden Joker prize, ceremony organized by Maxim.ru.

== See also ==
- Encyclopedia Dramatica
- Know Your Meme
- Uncyclopedia
