= Kashchenism =

Style of conversation used on internet forums

Kashchenism (Russian: кащенизм) is a specific style of conversation in forums and blogs used on Russian FidoNet and Internet. Its main feature is provocativeness and mockery while being formally polite. Historically, Kashchenist style uses many words and idioms of Jewish origin; in conversations, Kashchenists often pretend to be Jews, in order to troll antisemites while also causing others to make excuses to prove that they are not antisemites. Kashchenist style also typically uses medical terms, especially from psychiatry; this is because Kashchenists consider themselves jocularly as "network psychiatrists", and imitate either medical staff or, conversely, patients in a mental hospital. The word "Kashchenism" also denotes a philosophy of people who use Kashchenist style in electronic conversations.

== Etymology ==
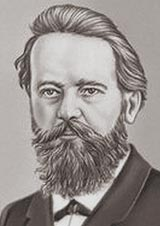
Pyotr Kashchenko

The word Kashchenism comes from the name of the Kashchenko psychiatric hospital. The hospital was named after the prominent Russian psychiatrist Pyotr Kashchenko. Kashchenists consider him to be their patron saint.

== Origin ==
Kashchenism originated as a FidoNet echo conference SU.KASCHENKO.LOCAL (SKL) created by Vladimir "MedBrat" Timofeev in 1998.

In the first half of the 2000s, SKL (and Russian FidoNet in general) slowly became deserted, and in 2005 MedBrat led residual Kashchenists away from SKL to the Internet forum kaschenko.ru.

== Ideology and philosophy ==
Kashchenists logo

The basics of an ideology of Kashchenism are laid out in a text called "Kashchenesis".

Also, there is a digest of the Kashchenist ideology formulated in three phrases, a kind of Kashchenists motto; the phrases are:

- Rigorous observance of mutually exclusive points.
- Brutal politrecal correctness. (This is a pun based on homophones: пол-литра (pollítra), half a litre [of vodka], and политкорректность (polítkorréktnost`), political correctness.)
- Total schizophasia.

The same in Russian (as it is written in an upper part of every page of kaschenko.ru):

- Неукоснительное соблюдение взаимоисключающих параграфов.
- Брутальная поллитркорректность.
- Тотальная шизофазия.

Since those slogans, written in Russian, contain eight words containing 99 letters in total, Kashchenists often abbreviate their motto as 8/99, and use this abbreviation as a greeting (which is in turn a mockery of the Nazi greeting 14/88).

== Influence ==
The influence of Kashchenism upon the Russian Internet includes the influence of Kashchenist slang, which is now known and is sometimes used by a big part of Russophone Internet users, though they never were Kashchenists themselves. Also, Kashchenists, who appeared earlier than the "padonki" subculture, contributed much to padonkaffsky jargon, and many of the early "padonki" were former Kashchenists.
