= Mad scientist =

Stock character in fiction

A common stereotype of a mad scientist

The mad scientist, also known as the mad doctor or mad professor, is a stock character of a scientist who has unusual or unsettling personality traits, usually in the taboo or hubristic nature of their experiments.

As a motif in fiction, the mad scientist may be villainous (evil genius) or antagonistic, benign, or neutral; may be insane, eccentric, or clumsy; and often works with fictional technology or fails to recognise or value common human objections to attempting to play God. Some may have benevolent intentions, even if their actions are dangerous or questionable, making them accidental antagonists.

== History ==
=== Prototypes ===
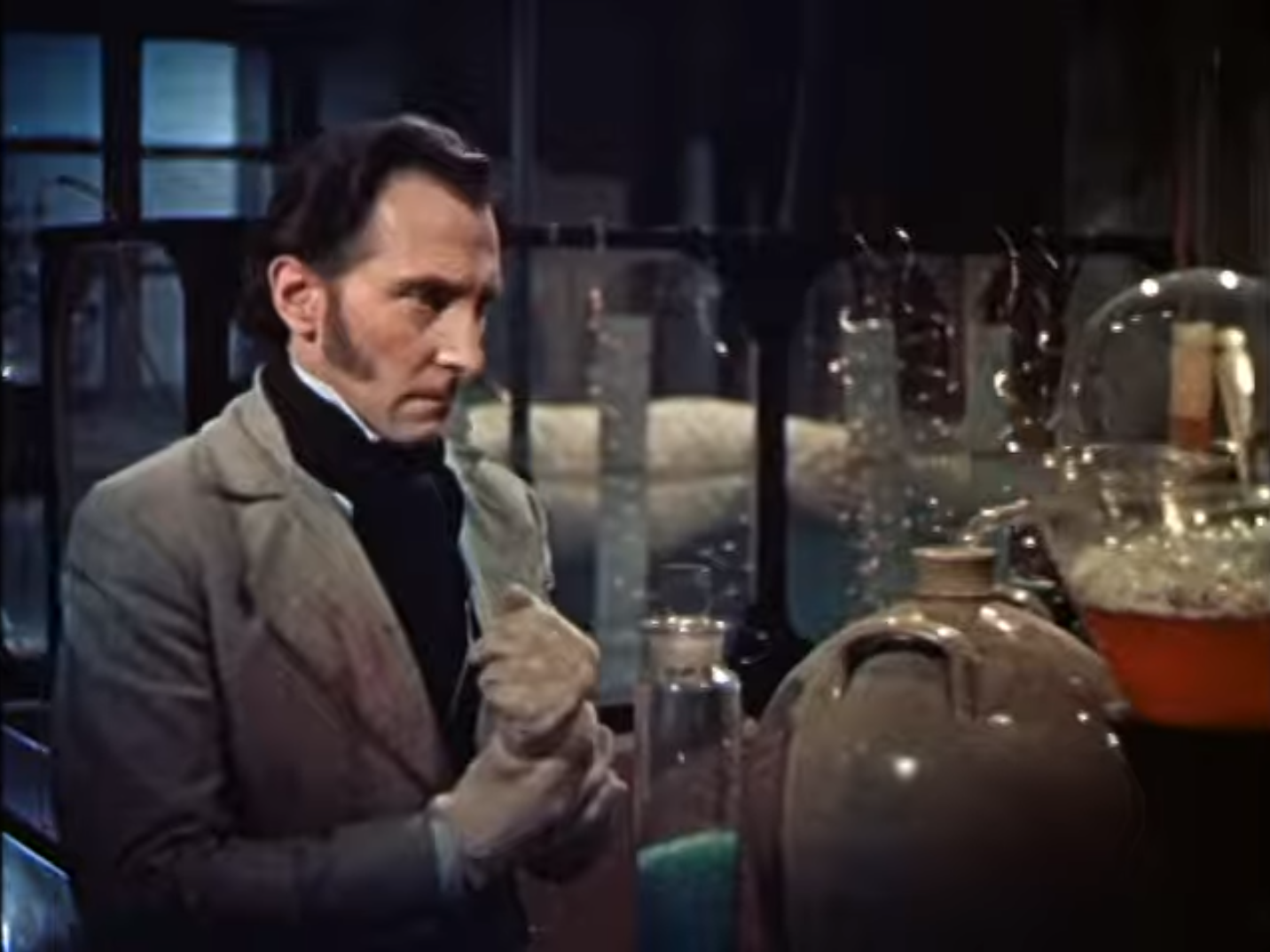
Victor Frankenstein in The Curse of Frankenstein (1957)

The prototypical fictional mad scientist was Victor Frankenstein, creator of his eponymous monster, who made his first appearance in 1818, in the novel Frankenstein, or the Modern Prometheus by Mary Shelley. Though the novel's title character, Victor Frankenstein, is a sympathetic character, the critical element of conducting experiments that cross "boundaries that ought not to be crossed", heedless of the consequences, is present in Shelley's novel. Frankenstein was trained as both an alchemist and a modern scientist, which makes him the bridge between two eras of an evolving archetype. The book is said to be a precursor of a new genre, science fiction, although as an example of gothic horror it is connected with other antecedents as well.

The year 1896 saw the publication of H. G. Wells's The Island of Doctor Moreau, in which the titular doctor—a controversial vivisectionist—has isolated himself entirely from civilisation in order to continue his experiments in surgically reshaping animals into humanoid forms, heedless of the suffering he causes. In 1925, the novelist Alexander Belyaev introduced mad scientists to the Russian people through the novel Professor Dowell's Head, in which the antagonist performs experimental head transplants on bodies stolen from the morgue, and reanimates the corpses.

=== Cinema depictions ===
Fritz Lang's movie Metropolis (1927) brought the archetypical mad scientist to the screen in the form of Rotwang, the evil genius whose machines had originally given life to the dystopian city of the title. Rotwang's laboratory influenced many subsequent movie sets with its electrical arcs, bubbling apparatus, and bizarrely complicated arrays of dials and controls. Portrayed by actor Rudolf Klein-Rogge, Rotwang himself is the prototypically conflicted mad scientist. Boris Karloff played mad scientists in several of his 1930s and 1940s films.

A 2005 survey of 1,000 horror films distributed in the UK between the 1930s and 1980s reveals mad scientists or their creations have been the villains of 30 percent of the films; scientific research has produced 39 percent of the threats; and, by contrast, scientists have been the heroes of a mere 11 percent. Writer Christopher Frayling has commented that mad scientists are perceived as "mad, bad and dangerous to know."

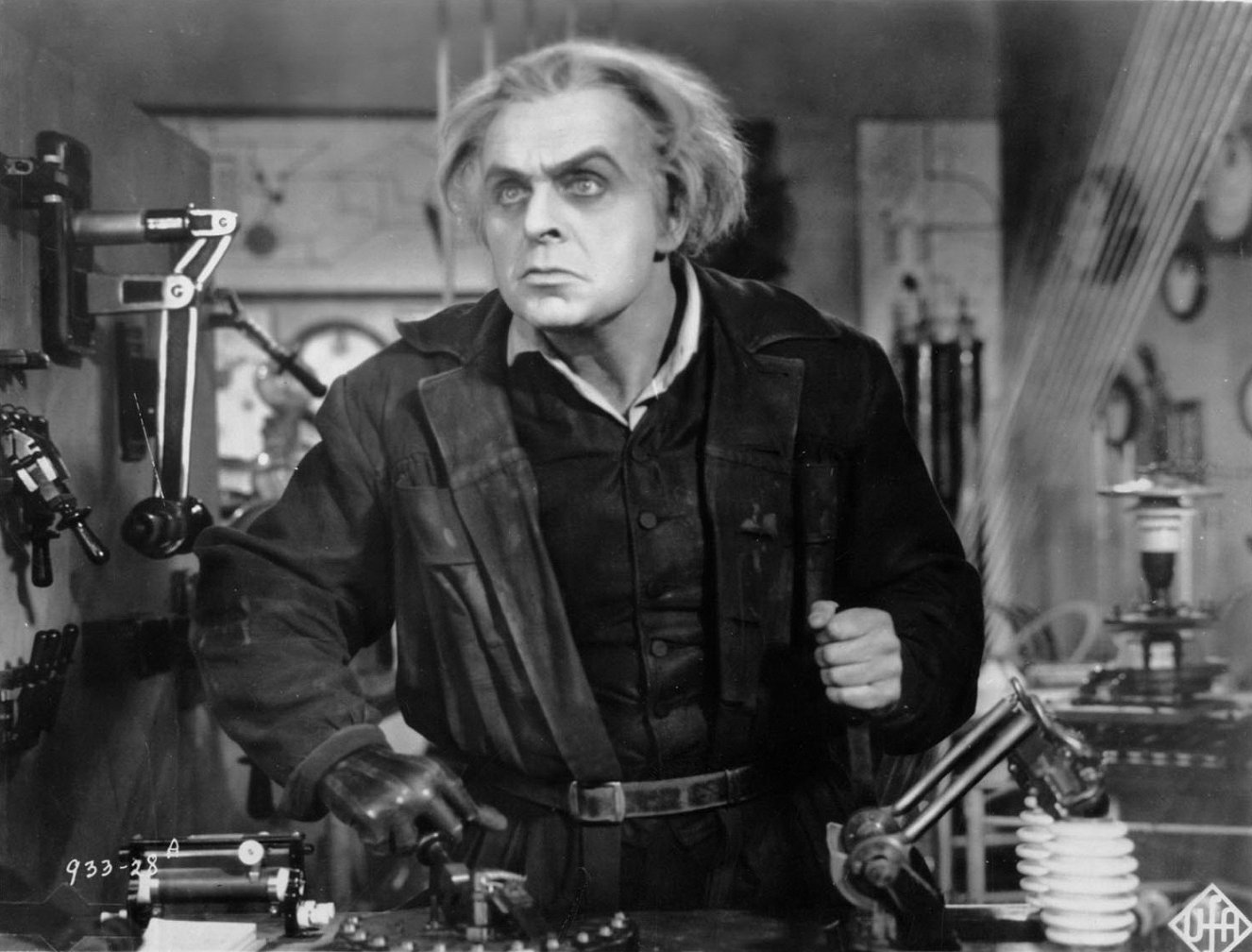
Rotwang in Metropolis (1927)

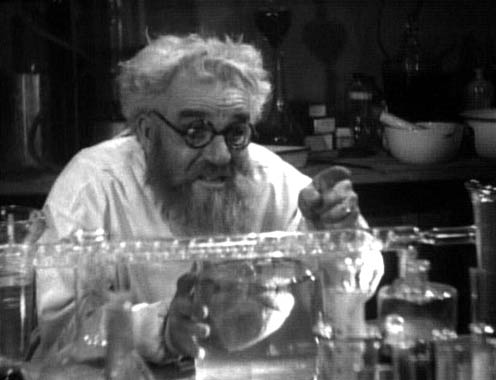
Horace B. Carpenter as Dr. Meirschultz trying to revive the dead in Maniac (1934)

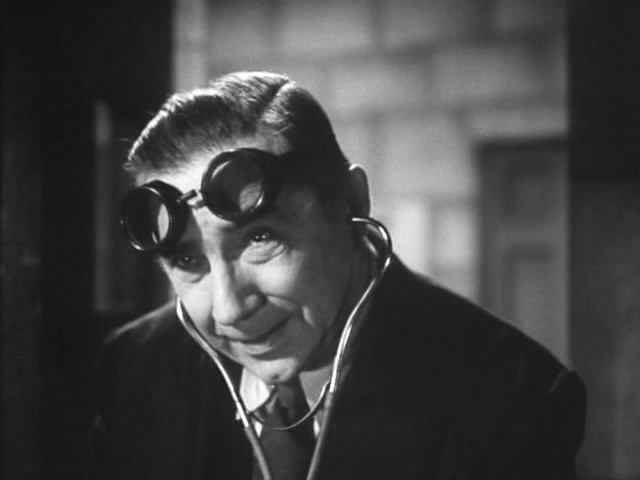
Bela Lugosi as Dr. Paul Carruthers, the mad scientist in The Devil Bat (1940).

=== Post–World War II depictions ===
Mad scientists were most conspicuous in popular culture after World War II. The sadistic human experimentation conducted under the auspices of the Nazis, especially those of Josef Mengele, and the invention of the atomic bomb, gave rise in this period to genuine fears that science and technology had gone out of control. That the scientific and technological build-up during the Cold War brought about increasing threats of unparalleled destruction of the human species did not lessen the impression. Mad scientists frequently figure in science fiction and motion pictures from the period.

== See also ==
- Category:Fictional mad scientists
- Absent-minded professor
- Boffin
- British scientists (meme)
- Creativity techniques
- Creativity and mental health
- Edisonade, a positive trope about a brilliant inventor
- Egghead
- Faust
- Fringe science
- Girl Genius
- List of mad scientists
- Mad scientists of Stanislaw Lem
