= Pyotr Kashchenko =

Psychiatrist and activist

- Пётр Петрович Кащенко
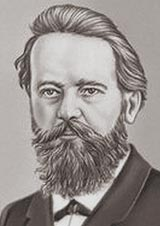
- Portrait of Pyotr Kashchenko, 1858
- Pronunciation: [ˈpʲɵtr pʲɪˈtrovʲɪt͡ɕ ˈkaɕːɪnkə]
- Born: January 9, 1859; Yeysk, Kuban Oblast, Russian Empire
- Died: February 19, 1920 (aged 61); Moscow
- Resting place: Novodevichy Cemetery
- Citizenship: Russian Empire
- Education: Kazan Imperial University (1885)
- Spouse: Vera Aleksandrovna Gorenkina
- Children: 7
- Scientific career
- Fields: Psychiatry
- Workplaces: Moscow Psychiatric Hospital, Sivoritsy Psychiatric Hospital

Pyotr Petrovich Kashchenko (Russian: Пётр Петро́вич Ка́щенко; December 28, 1858 (9 January 1859) in Yeysk – February 19, 1920, in Moscow) was a psychiatrist, social and agrarian activist, author of articles on mental health and mental health services from the Russian Empire.

== Biography ==
In 1876–1881 he studied at Moscow University, where he was expelled for participating in student revolutionary movement and was expelled from Moscow to Stavropol. In 1885 he graduated from the Faculty of Medicine Kazan Federal University and received his medical degree. In 1889–1904, he served as director of the Psychiatric Hospital of the Nizhny Novgorod Zemstvo. The "Chronic" Mental Hospital of Lyakhovo was founded on February 10, 1901, as the "Colony of Lyakhovo". A Head of the Moscow and St. Petersburg psychiatric hospital. In the years 1904–1906 he was the head physician of the Moscow's Alekseyev Psychiatric Hospital.

In 1905 he participated in the revolutionary events in Moscow, helping the wounded during the uprising in Presnya. In 1905–1906 gg. He led the illegal cross-party Red Cross. Organiser and chairman of the Central Statistical Bureau of the first in Russia to account for mental patients. In May 1917 he led the neuro-psychiatric section of the Council of medical colleges, in 1918–1920 he headed the Subdivision neuro-psychiatric care Commissariat RSFSR. He was buried in the Novodevichy Cemetery.

From 1922 to 1994 the Moscow Psychiatric Hospital No. 1 was named after Kashchenko. Now this hospital is named Nikolay Alekseyev – Mayor of Moscow (1885–1893), the initiator of the construction of hospitals and fundraising organizer for this construction. St. Petersburg Psychiatric Hospital No. 1, where he was the first Chief Physician (1909–1918), and Nizhny Novgorod Regional Psychoneurological Hospital No. 1 (former Colony of Lyakhovo) are also named after him. The word Kashchenko has become a colloquialism for mental asylum.
