= Konstantin Rykov =

Russian politician (born 1979)

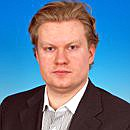

Konstantin Igorevich Rykov (Russian: Константин Игоревич Рыков; a.k.a. Jason Foris; born 27 May 1979) is a Russian politician, head of Newmedia Stars Corporation, owner of the Goodoo production company.

== Biography ==
Rykov was born in Moscow. Since 1998 he made his mark as one of the first professional Russian Internet producers. Rykov, together with Egor Lavrov, created websites and television programs, such as the popular TV show Star Factory. Since 2002, he has been working as head of the Internet department of the First Channel of the state television, where he cooperated with art impresario Marat Gelman in a range of political websites. He is an internet entrepreneur, influential social media manipulator, and the owner of an internet brothel.

Rykov's latest media projects include the production of electronic newspapers Дни and Взгляд (Dni and Vzglyad - "Days" and "Look"), publication and promotion of controversial bestselling novelists Sergey Minaev and Eduard Bagirov, and support of Vladimir Putin via several websites.

== Political career ==
On 2 December 2007, Rykov was elected as a deputy of the Duma representing Nizhny Novgorod as a candidate of pro-Kremlin party United Russia. He served in the Duma through 2011.

== Involvement in election interference efforts ==
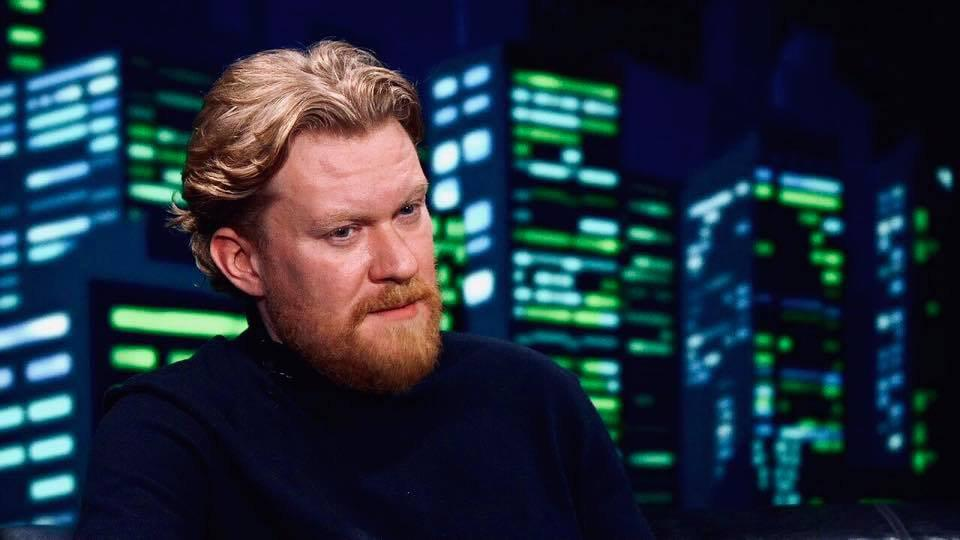
Konstantin Rykov (2020)

Besides his own personal involvement in Russian politics, Rykov has also reportedly used his internet credentials and relationship with Kremlin officials to involve himself in various political campaigns and referendums in both Russia and other countries. Following Russia's invasion and subsequent annexation of Ukraine's Crimean Peninsula in 2014, Rykov and numerous followers flooded social networks with pro-Kremlin narratives and even directly engaged U.S. officials such as the former U.S. Ambassador to Russia, Michael McFaul.

The following year, Rykov started a Russian website in support of then U.S. presidential candidate Donald Trump, and would later boast that he was responsible for Trump's victory in the 2016 U.S. Presidential Election. This Russian support for Trump was part of the "sweeping and systematic" Russian interference in the 2016 elections. The Senate Intelligence Committee had "concerns" about Rykov and his role in influence operations directed against Ukrainian and United States elections.

Rykov has asserted he began promoting Trump as a future president as far back as 2012.

Peter Jukes cites him:

he and his colleagues had the 'insane idea' that they would 'digitise all possible types of modern man' and 'change their perception of reality' to elect Trump as President.
With a level of detail about the psychometric profiling which would have been hard to come by without intimate knowledge, Rykov explained [how Cambridge Analytica was used to do this].

Jukes described Rykov as "a maverick online entrepreneur, politician and disrupter. An early adopter of internet memes, conspiracy theories and social media disinformation":

So strong was Rykov's association with the early years of political trolling, sock puppets, automated avatars and other kinds of information operations that, as early as 2007, his bot armies were described as 'Rykovians' or 'Rykovites'. ...
So, as a provable Kremlin propagandist, Rykov certainly has the credentials to make his extraordinary claim about the 2016 US Presidential Election. Moreover, there is independent corroboration that he was supporting Trump in October 2012.

Rykov also started a Russian website in 2015 in support of then-candidate Trump and later boasted that he was responsible for Trump's victory in the 2016 presidential election.

Rykov has described the history of his working with Trump, how Trump responded to a tweet of his on November 6, 2012, and how that started what Rykov called a "four years and two days" cooperation between Trump, Russians who wanted him elected, and Cambridge Analytica. Martin Longman described the first contact between Rykov and Trump in 2012 and this cooperation in an article for Washington Monthly titled "A #TrumpRussia Confession in Plain Sight. Putin ally Konstantin Rykov explained the #TrumpRussia conspiracy on Facebook over a year ago."

The digital and social media team working for Trump was extensive. According to Brad Parscale, the Trump campaign's digital operations chief, Cambridge Analytica worked "side-by-side" with representatives from Facebook, Alphabet Inc., and Twitter on Trump's digital campaign activities.

Lawfare added more names to that group and mentioned how the Senate Intelligence Committee examined

the extent to which foreign-based influence companies played a role in shaping the outcome of the 2016 presidential election—either directly or through American counterparts. It looks specifically at three companies—Cambridge Analytica, Psy-Group and Colt Ventures—each of which had some sort of foreign ties and had contact with the Trump campaign. Each of these three companies either aspired to apply, or actually did apply, microtargeted social media messaging techniques 'comparable to those employed by Russian information operatives with the Internet Research Agency.'

At the time, Steve Bannon was not only Trump's chief strategist and Chief Executive of the Trump campaign (August 2016-November 2016), he was the vice-president and a co-founder of Cambridge Analytica.

They all worked together to develop methods to influence voters to support Trump using digital analysis, microtargeted social media campaigns, and websites. Rykov implicated Trump in inviting Cambridge Analytica, and he clearly described how their short-term and long-term goals were to

Ensure the victory of Donald in the election of the US President. Then create a political alliance between the United States, France, Russia (and a number of other states) and establish a new world order. ...
Donald decided to invite for this task - the special scientific department of the 'Cambridge University.'
British scientists from Cambridge Analytica suggested making 5,000 existing human psychotypes - the 'ideal image' of a possible Trump supporter.

Jukes cited Rykov: "This 'secret super-weapon' cost Trump only $5 million and it was boosted by 'a pair of hacker groups [and] civil journalists from WikiLeaks.'" Jukes concluded that "Rykov has both the credibility, connections and inside knowledge to make claims about Russian interests working in league with Cambridge Analytica during the Trump campaign."

The Economist cited Rykov's description of how Trump could serve Russian interests: "Trump will smash America as we know it, we've got nothing to lose."

With the benefit of hindsight, Longman has written about how "Konstantin Rykov's confession fits what congressional investigators have suspected for months." The Senate Committee was concerned about Rykov's and Klyushin's activities:

In addition to his connection to Klyushin, Rykov maintains contact with a network of anti-U.S. and pro-Kremlin bloggers and trolls, many of whom responded to calls by Rykov to participate in U.S. election-related efforts online in 2016. Following the election, many of those actors took steps to hide their activities.

Unlike the others who "took steps to hide their activities", Rykov did not hide what he did. Martin Longman wrote about Konstantin Rykov's claim that his collusion with Donald Trump and Cambridge Analytica had been "decisive" in winning the election:

Putin propagandist and notorious Moscow digital pimp Konstantin Rykov claimed in a pair of Facebook posts dated November 12th and November 16th [2016], that he had colluded with Trump and Cambridge Analytica, and that their collusion had been decisive in winning the election.

Peter Jukes wrote about two Facebook posts by Rykov, written right after Trump's election in November 2016:

Rykov claimed he had coordinated two hacking organisations and Wikileaks to get Trump elected in an 'insane, but realisable' propaganda campaign based on psychology and social media, which was able [to] 'digitize' all possible types of modern man. ... This was only four days after the election of Trump. At that point, Cambridge Analytica's work for Trump was not widely known, and its psychometric targeting even more secret.

Molly Schwartz wrote: "While the impact of Rykov's campaigning is unknown, Rykov has boasted that he is responsible for helping Trump take the White House. While that claim may be far-fetched, Rykov's influence on Russia's online strategy is undeniable."

Martin Longman wrote about the legitimacy of Rykov's boasting:

Could he possibly have made such boasts without having any knowledge of what would soon be divulged or discovered about Russian hacking and collusion between Wikileaks and Cambridge Analytica or the work that was done by Cambridge Analytica and how it was utilized on social media?
Of course not. His boasts were rooted in facts and inside knowledge.

He also claimed that, though they succeeded with Trump, they unfortunately failed with Marine Le Pen. These claims, including the role of Cambridge Analytica, were posted a year before Special Counsel Robert Mueller would indict members of the Internet Research Agency involved in active measures to win the U.S. election for Donald Trump and years before FBI indictments revealed the role of WikiLeaks in deploying material hacked from the Democratic National Committee by Fancy Bear, associated with Russian military agency GRU, and by the FSB's Cozy Bear group.
