= Maksim Krongauz =

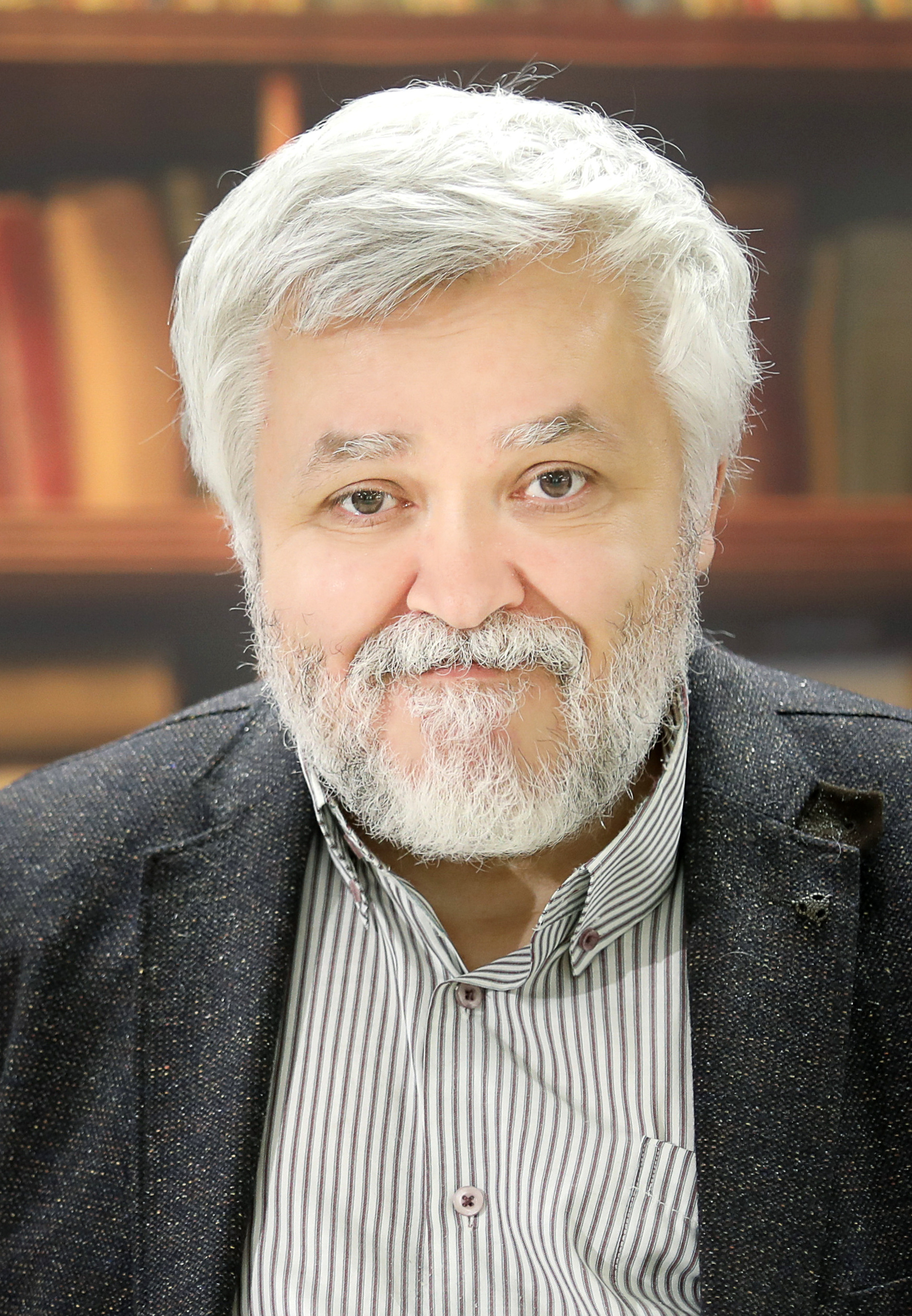
Maksim Krongauz, 2018

Maksim Anisimovich Krongauz (Russian: Кронгауз, Максим Анисимович) is a Soviet and Russian linguist, professor of the Russian State University for the Humanities and Higher School of Economics. His interests include structural and applied linguistics, semiotics, and Russian language, in particular semiotics of language and culture, grammar of Russian language, semantics, theory of referents and pragmatics, theory of dialogue, political discourse, and humor; popular science writer.

== Books ==
- Крейдлин Г. Е., Кронгауз М. А. Семиотика, или Азбука общения. — Московский институт развития образовательных систем, 1997. — 272 с. — 7000 экз. — ISBN 5-7084-0142-7. (+ 2 переиздания)
- «Приставки и глаголы в русском языке: Семантическая грамматика» (1998),
- Кронгауз М. А. Семантика. — РГГУ, 2001. — 400 с. — 4000 экз. — ISBN 5-7281-0344-8.
- 2012, 2017: Russian Language on the verge of Nervous Breakdown ("Russian Language on the Verge of Nervous Breakdown")
  About linguistic shifts in Russian language in modern era: massive influx of slang, anglicisms, "legalization of criminal argot and obscene language, in particular, under the influence of the internet and social networks.
- 2013: Кронгауз М. А. A Self-study Guide to Olbansky Language. — М.: АСТ, 2013. — 416 с. — 5000 экз. — ISBN 978-5-17-077807-2.
  Russian language in the internet
- 2015: Кронгауз М. А. Слово за слово. О языке и не только. — Издательский дом «Дело» РАНХиГС, 2015. — 480 с. — 1000 экз. — ISBN 978-5-7749-0964-3.
- Словарь языка интернета.ru / под ред. М. А. Кронгауза. — М.: АСТ-Пресс Книга, 2016. — 288 с. — 3000 экз. — ISBN 978-5-462-01853-4.
- Кронгауз М. А., Пиперски А. Ч., Сомин А. А. Сто языков. Вселенная слов и смыслов. — М.: АСТ, 2018. — 224 с. — 3000 экз. — ISBN 978-5-17-104696-5.
- (With Maria Buras) children's books:
  - 2016: Выше некуда! Новогодняя сказка
  - 2017: Откуда берутся дети
  - 2022: Тысяча лет и один день

== Awards and recognition ==
- 1991: Honoured Worker of Higher Professional Education of the Russian Federation
- 1993: Enlightener Prize

== Personal ==
Married to Maria Buras, Russian linguist and writer.
