= Eye dialect =

Literary technique involving nonstandard spelling

Eye dialect is the literary device of using deliberately nonstandard spelling. Typically the purpose of eye dialect is to more phonetically reflect pronunciations or, most commonly, to portray informal or nonstandard language usage. Eye dialect is often a shorthand way for an author to indicate, through a character's language, that the character is lower-class or uneducated, sometimes for comedic effect. The spellings may even represent standard pronunciations (e.g. bloo for blue or enuff for enough) and the convention violated is thus "one of the eye, not of the ear".

The term was coined by George Philip Krapp in 1925. It is sometimes used more broadly to describe any attempt to represent nonstandard speech in spelling, whether or not the pronunciations indicated are standard.

== Use ==
Most authors are likely to use eye dialect with restraint, sprinkling nonstandard misspellings here and there to serve as a cue to the reader about all of a character's speech, rather than as an accurate phonetic representation. While mostly used in dialogue, eye dialect may appear in the narrative depiction of altered spelling made by a character (such as in a letter or diary entry), generally used to more overtly depict characters who are poorly educated or semi-literate.

The term eye dialect was first used by George Philip Krapp in 1925, in The English Language in America:

Of the dialect material employed in American literature, several clear kinds may be distinguished. First and most extensive in use is the class dialect which distinguishes between popular and cultivated or standard speech. This calls for no detailed discussion. The impression of popular speech is easily produced by a sprinkling of such forms as aint, for isn't, done for did, them for those, and similar grammatical improprieties. This impression is often assisted by what may be termed "eye dialect," in which the convention violated is one of the eye, not of the ear. Thus a dialect writer often spells a word like front as frunt, or face as fase, or picture as pictsher, not because he intends to indicate here a genuine difference of pronunciation, but the spelling is merely a friendly nudge to the reader, a knowing look which establishes a sympathetic sense of superiority between the author and reader as contrasted with the humble speaker of dialect.

The term is less commonly used to refer to pronunciation spellings, that is, spellings of words that indicate that they are pronounced in a nonstandard way. For example, an author might write dat as an attempt at accurate transcription of a nonstandard pronunciation of that.

In an article on written representations of speech in a non-literary context, such as transcription by sociolinguists, Denis R. Preston argued that such spellings serve mainly to "denigrate the speaker so represented by making him or her appear boorish, uneducated, rustic, gangsterish, and so on".

Jane Raymond Walpole points out that there are other ways to indicate speech variation such as altered syntax, punctuation, and colloquial or regional word choices. She observes that a reader must be prompted to access their memory of a given speech pattern and that non-orthographic signals that accomplish this may be more effective than eye dialect. Frank Nuessel points out that use of eye dialect closely interacts with stereotypes about various groups, both relying on and reinforcing them in an attempt to efficiently characterize speech.

In The Lie That Tells a Truth: A Guide to Writing Fiction, John Dufresne cites The Columbia Guide to Standard American English in suggesting that writers avoid eye dialect; he argues that it is frequently pejorative, making a character seem stupid rather than regional, and is more distracting than helpful. Like Walpole, Dufresne suggests that dialect should be rendered by "rhythm of the prose, by the syntax, the diction, idioms and figures of speech, by the vocabulary indigenous to the locale". Other writers have noted that eye dialect has sometimes been used in derisive fashion toward ethnic or regional pronunciation, in particular by contrasting standard spelling with nonstandard spelling to emphasize differences.

Eye dialect, when consistently applied, may render a character's speech indecipherable. An attempt to accurately render nonstandard speech may also prove difficult to readers unfamiliar with a particular accent.

== Examples in English ==
=== Prose fiction ===
Charles Dickens combined eye dialect with pronunciation spelling and nonstandard grammar in the speech of his uneducated characters. An example in Bleak House is the following dialogue spoken by Jo, the miserable boy who sweeps a path across a street:

...there wos other genlmen come down Tom-all-Alone's a-prayin, but they all mostly sed as the t'other wuns prayed wrong, and all mostly sounded as to be a-talking to theirselves, or a-passing blame on the t'others, and not a-talkin to us.

In the above, wos, sed, and wuns indicate standard pronunciations.

In his Discworld series of books, Terry Pratchett makes extensive use of eye dialect to extend the caricature of his characters, besides other visual devices such as changing the font used for certain dialogue. Death, for example, speaks in small capitals, while the dialogue of a golem, who can communicate only by writing, resembles Hebrew script in reference to the origins of the golem legend. Eye dialect is also used to establish a medieval setting, wherein many characters' grasp of spelling is heavily based on phonetics.

=== Poetry ===
In his 1937 poem "The Arrest of Oscar Wilde at the Cadogan Hotel", John Betjeman deploys eye dialect on a handful of words for satirical effect; in this case the folly of the arresting police officers, who are made to seem like comic caricatures of themselves:

Mr. Woilde, we 'ave come for tew take yew
Where felons and criminals dwell:
We must ask yew tew leave with us quoietly
For this is the Cadogan Hotel.

An extreme example of a poem written entirely in (visually barely decipherable) eye dialect is "YgUDuh" by E. E. Cummings, which, as several commentators have noted, makes sense only when read aloud. In this case, Cummings's target was the attitudes of certain Americans to Japanese people following World War II.

=== In comics ===
American cartoonist Al Capp frequently combined eye dialect with pronunciation spelling in his comic strip Li'l Abner. Examples include lissen, aristocratick, mountin [mountain], correkt, feends, hed, introduckshun, leppard, and perhaps the most common, enuff. Only his rustic characters are given these spellings; for instance, the "overcivilized" Bounder J. Roundheels's dialogue contains gourmets, while Li'l Abner's contains goormays.

Cartoonist Walt Kelly made extensive use of eye dialect in Pogo. Like Pratchett, he used unique fonts for many of his supporting characters.

Some cartoonists and comic book creators eschew phonetic eye dialects in favor of font changes or distinctive speech balloons. Swamp Thing, for example, has traditionally been depicted using "crusty" yellow speech balloons and dialogue heavily laced with ellipses, suggesting a gravelly voice that only speaks with great effort. Robotic and computer characters often use square speech balloons and angular fonts reminiscent of OCR-A, suggesting a stilted, emotionless cadence. Thor's dialogue has routinely been written in an elegant font, implying his archaic vocabulary and pronunciation as a millennia-old god. After Thor passed the mantle to Jane Foster, her dialogue was written in the same font whenever she transformed into Thor, before reverting to normal when she did as well.

=== Other uses ===
American film director Quentin Tarantino used eye dialect for the title of his movie Inglourious Basterds.

The titles of a number of songs by Black Country band Slade, starting with "Coz I Luv You", are written in a Black Country pronunciation.

== Examples in other languages ==
The novel Zazie dans le Métro is written in French yet disregards almost all French spelling conventions, as the main viewpoint character is a young child.

== See also ==
- Apologetic apostrophe – Modern Scots orthography
- Eye rhyme – Type of rhyme
- Hypercorrection – Non-standard language usage
- Inventive spelling – Use of unconventional spellings of words
- Linguistic description – Work of objectively describing language use
- Linguistic prescription – Prescriptive rules of grammar and usage
- Mondegreen – Misinterpretation of a spoken phrase
- Preved – Meme on the Russian-speaking Internet
- Satiric misspelling – Deliberate misspelling for rhetorical purposes
- Sensational spelling – Non-standard spelling for effect
- Spelling pronunciation – Pronunciation of a word influenced by its spelling
- SMS language – Abbreviated slang used in text messaging
