= Groot Park =

City park in Aalst, Belgium

- Park schepen de Wolf
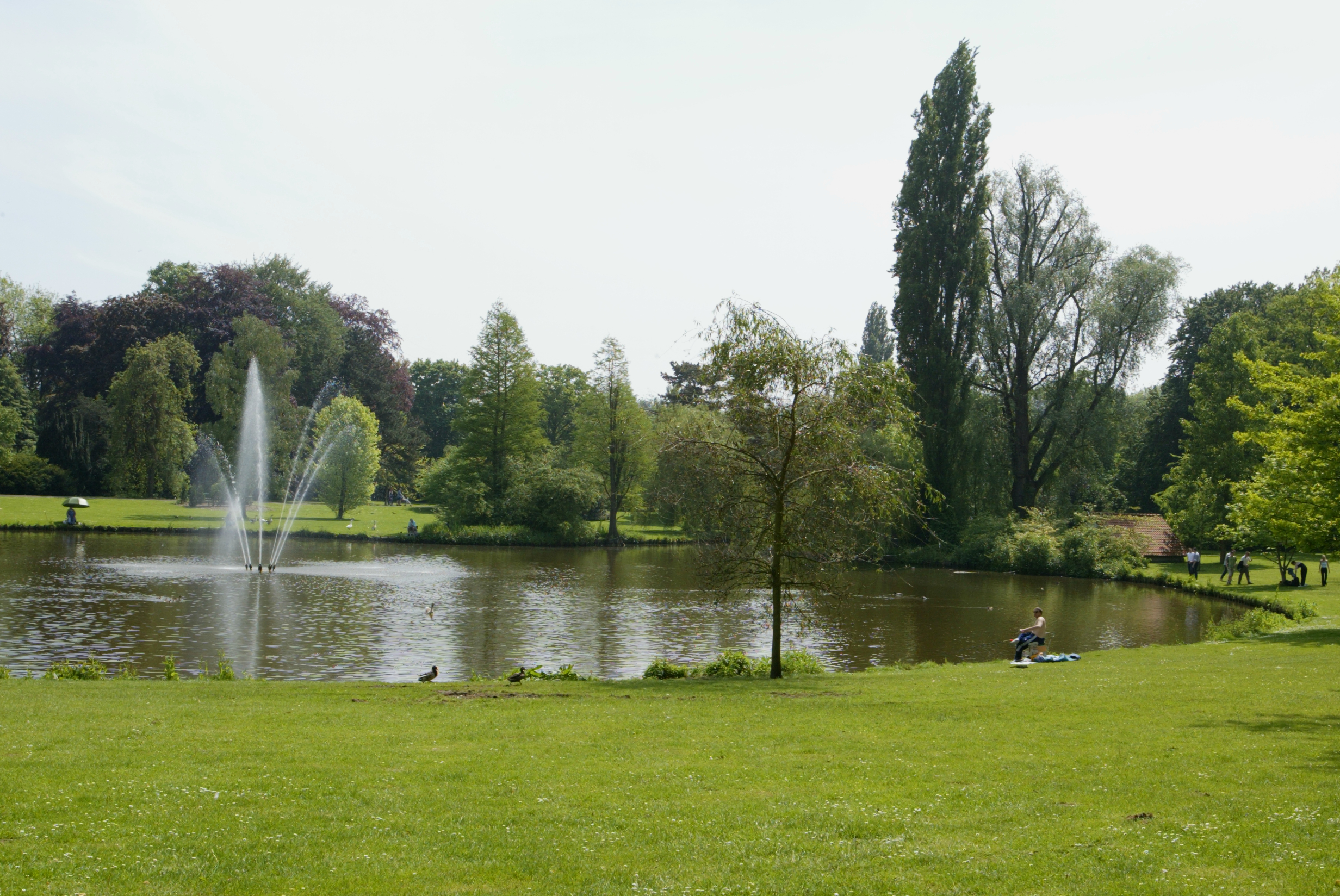
- The Groot park/stadspark of Aalst or Park schepen de Wolf

- Location within Belgium
- Location: East Flanders
- Nearest city: Aalst, Belgium
- Coordinates: 50.93032°N 4.046294°E
- Area: 37 acres (15 ha)
- Established: 1915
- Governing body: Flanders Heritage Agency

The Groot park or Park schepen de Wolf or city park of Aalst (stadspark) is a park in the Belgian city of Aalst. It can be regarded as an artificial nature domain with a recreational-educational function. The park covers an area of approximately 15 hectares (37 acres). The city park is located south of the city center. It is bordered by the Parklaan, Désiré De Wolfstraat and Erembodegemstraat.

The park is protected by the Flanders Heritage Agency.

It is located between the urban sports fields and the industrial zone on the Dender. In the south, the park flows into the Osbroek nature reserve, which covers almost 25 hectares (62 acres). The park is 800 meters away from De grote markt of Aalst.

The park was built in 1915 and the construction was a way to give jobless people a job. In the park there's the Melkhuisje (milk-house), a restaurant that is open since 1916, originally selling milk, now a restaurant. Since 2023 they're searching for a new owner of het Melkhuisje, its future is therefore uncertain.

Yearly the free Parkconcerten are hosted in the stadspark of Aalst. In 2023 Pommelien Thijs was the main act. There were 12 000 visitors to the concert.

== History ==
The park was created in the year 1915–1916, the ground was a part of the Osbroek, which is in its turn a remain of the Silva Carbonaria. The Osbroek was described in the 13th century as swamp-forest. The grounds were originally never edited because of its low grounds. In the 18th century they used the area as to win turf. They placed alders for their wood. When World War I was going on, the Osbroek started really turning into a park. Which it officially became by March 1916 after 8 months of work. The park was designed by Louis Breydel.

Factory Du Parc was named after the park.

=== Biodiversity ===
Circa 1990 had Bart Backaert, a worker of Groendienst Aalst, the idea to remove a part of the lawns. The idea was to create a better aesthetic and ecological diversity. The result was: rare wild orchids. The Ballonvijver (balloon-pond), has blue Prunella.

The park has 100 different types of trees, listing a few: the Quercus rubra, Salix sepulchalis ‘Chrysocoma’ and a Robinia pseudoacacia

== Gallery ==
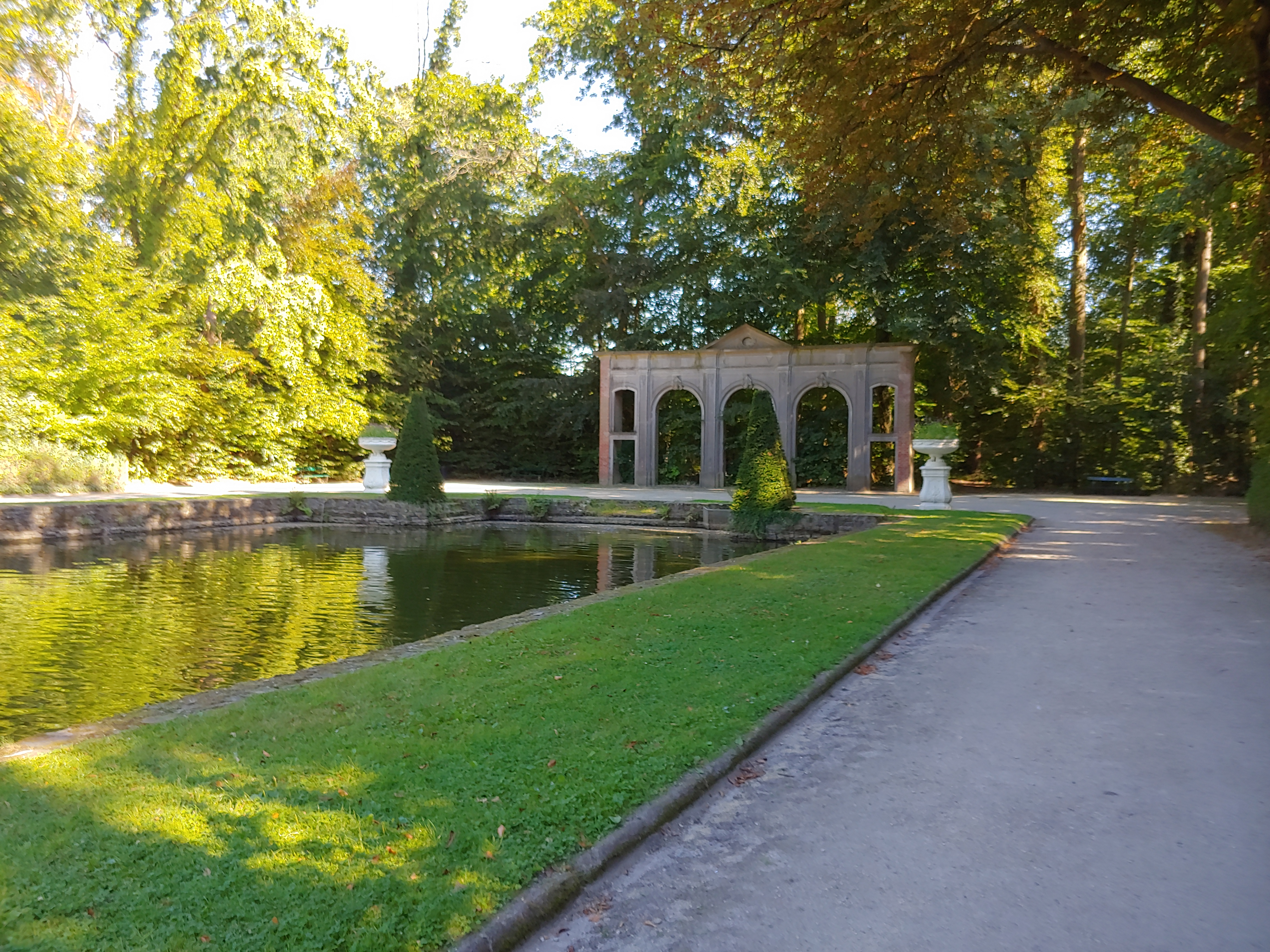
The spiegelvijver (mirror-pond).

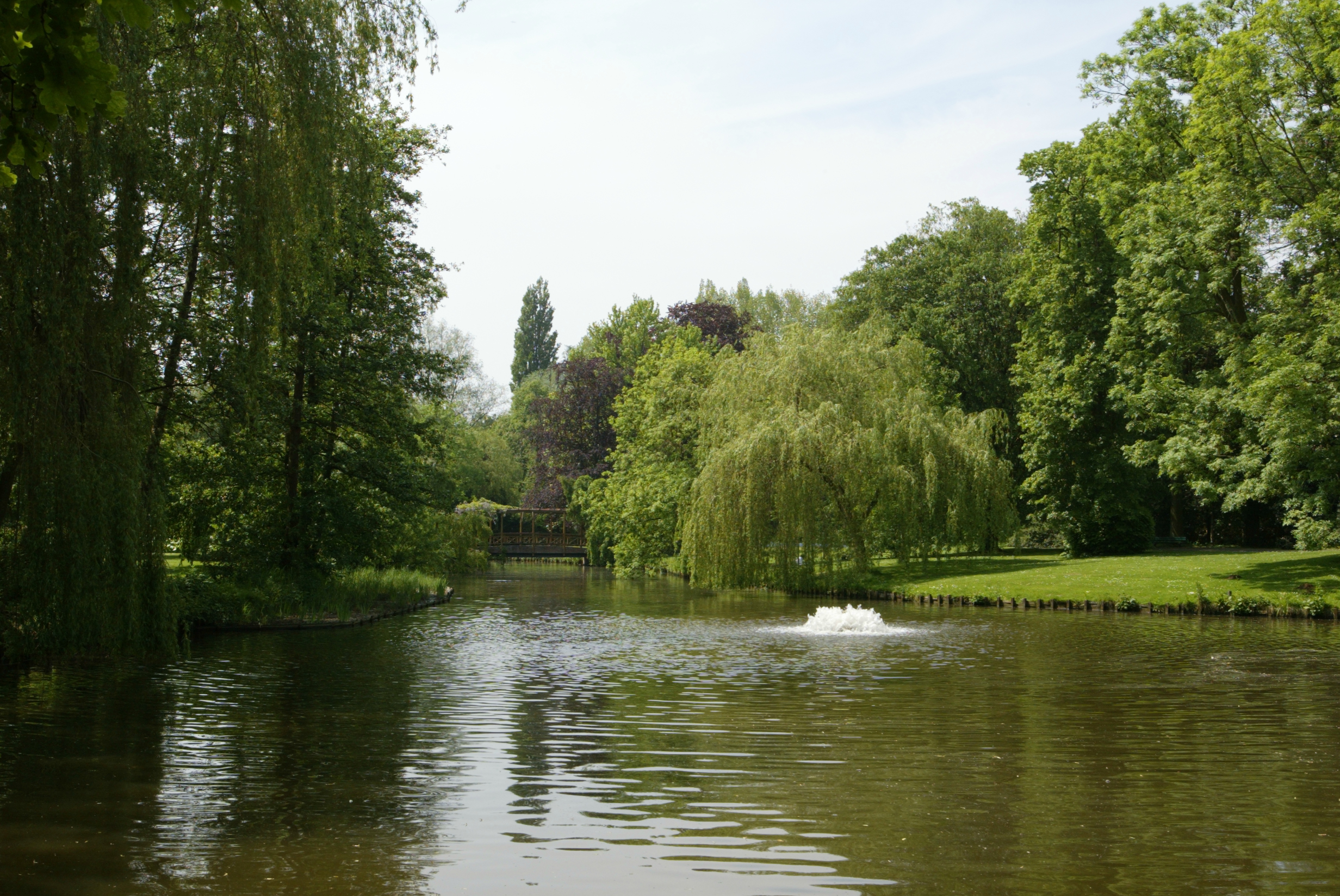

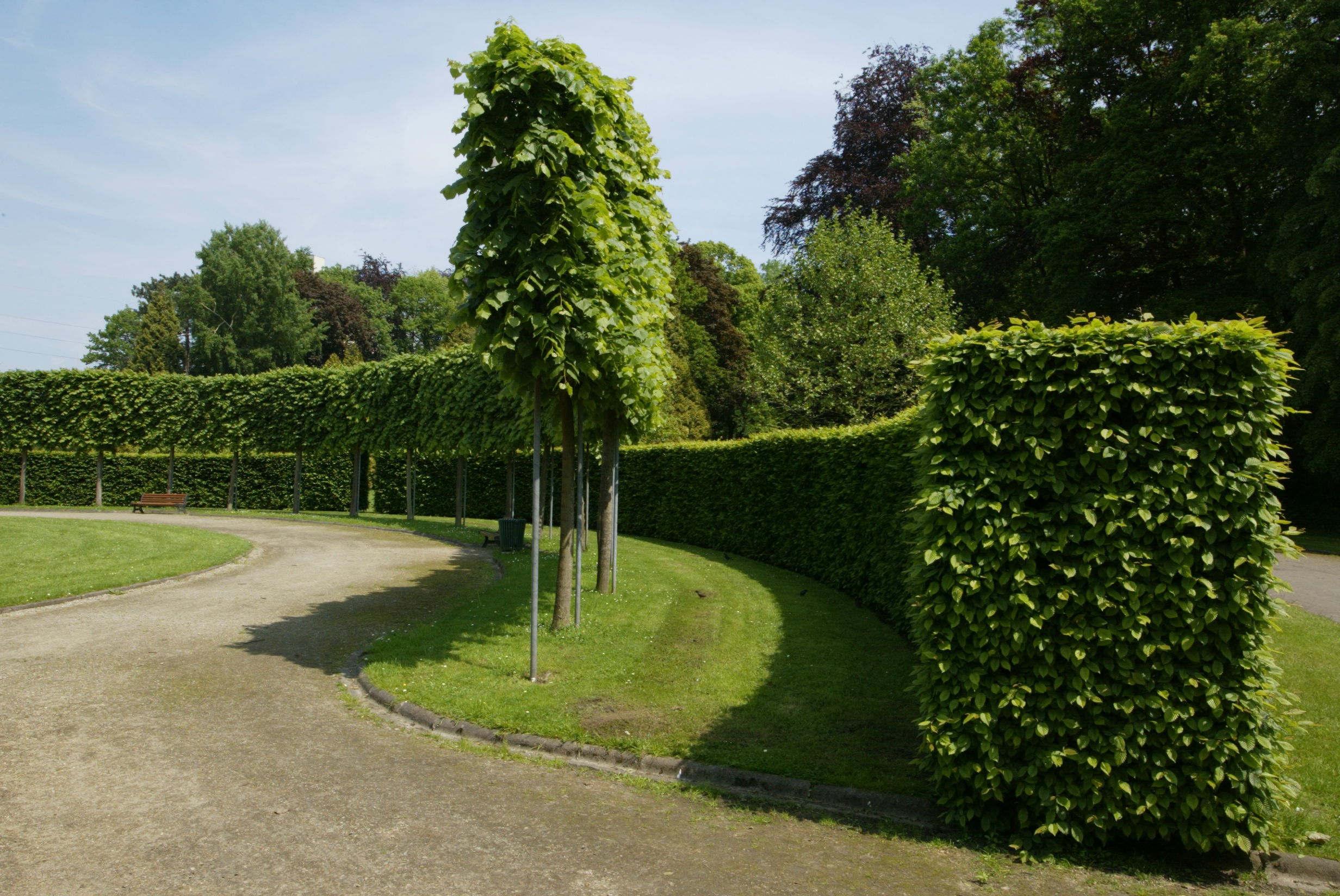

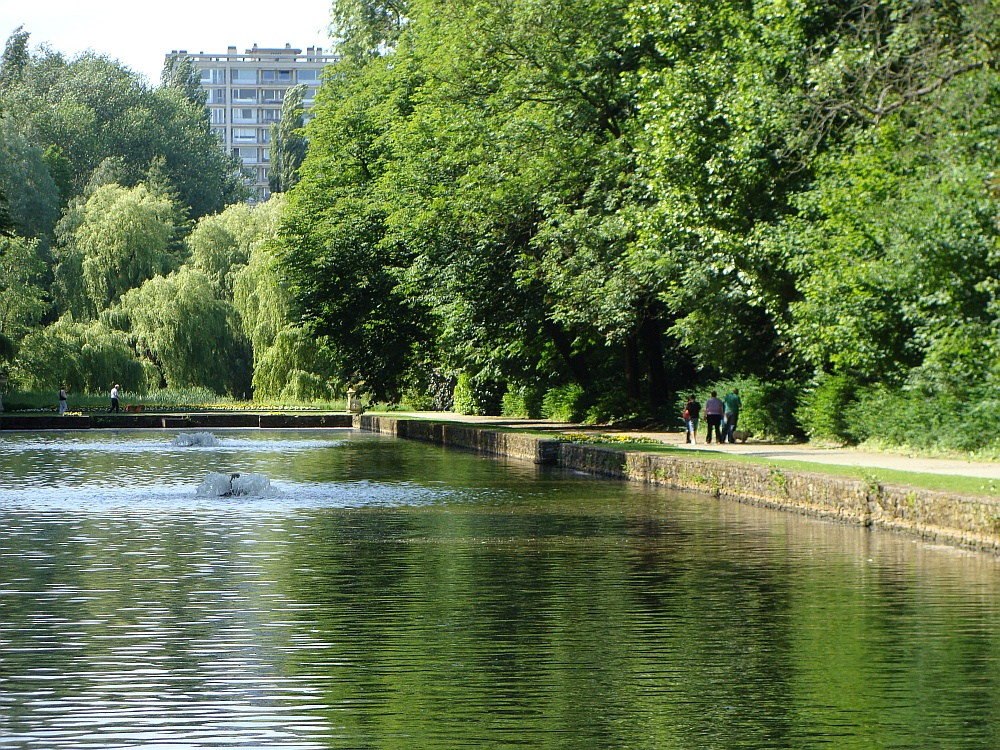

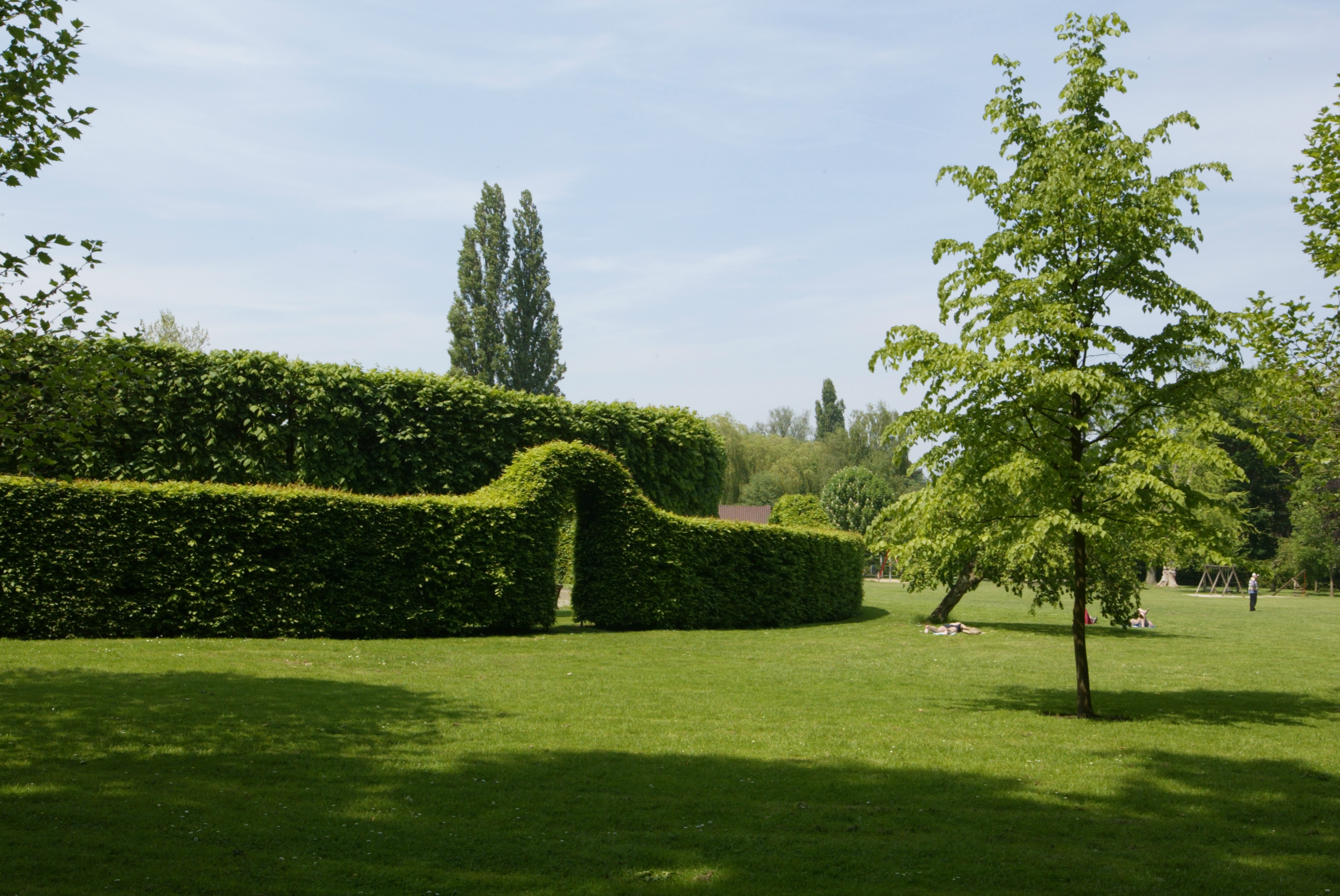
The labyrinth.

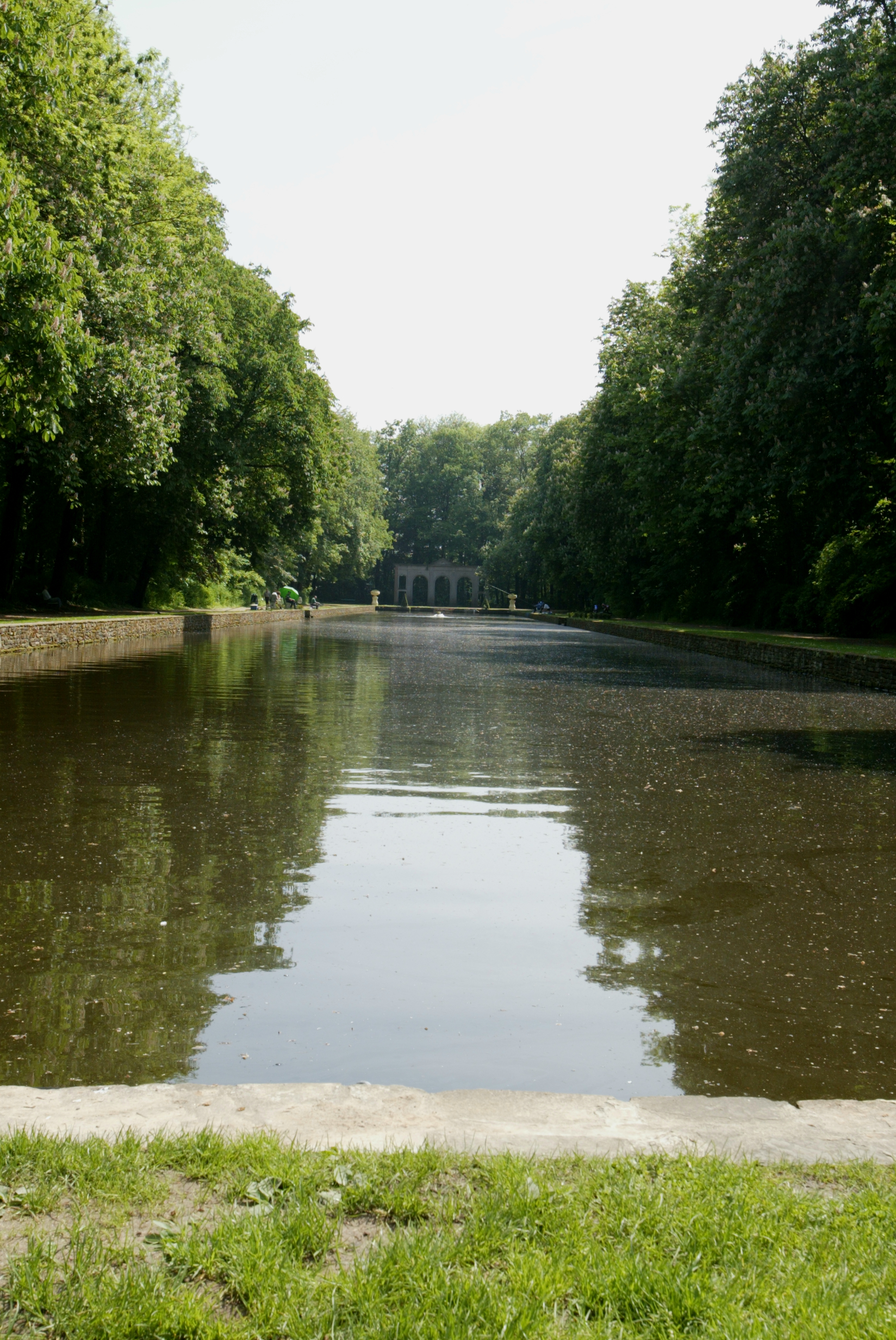

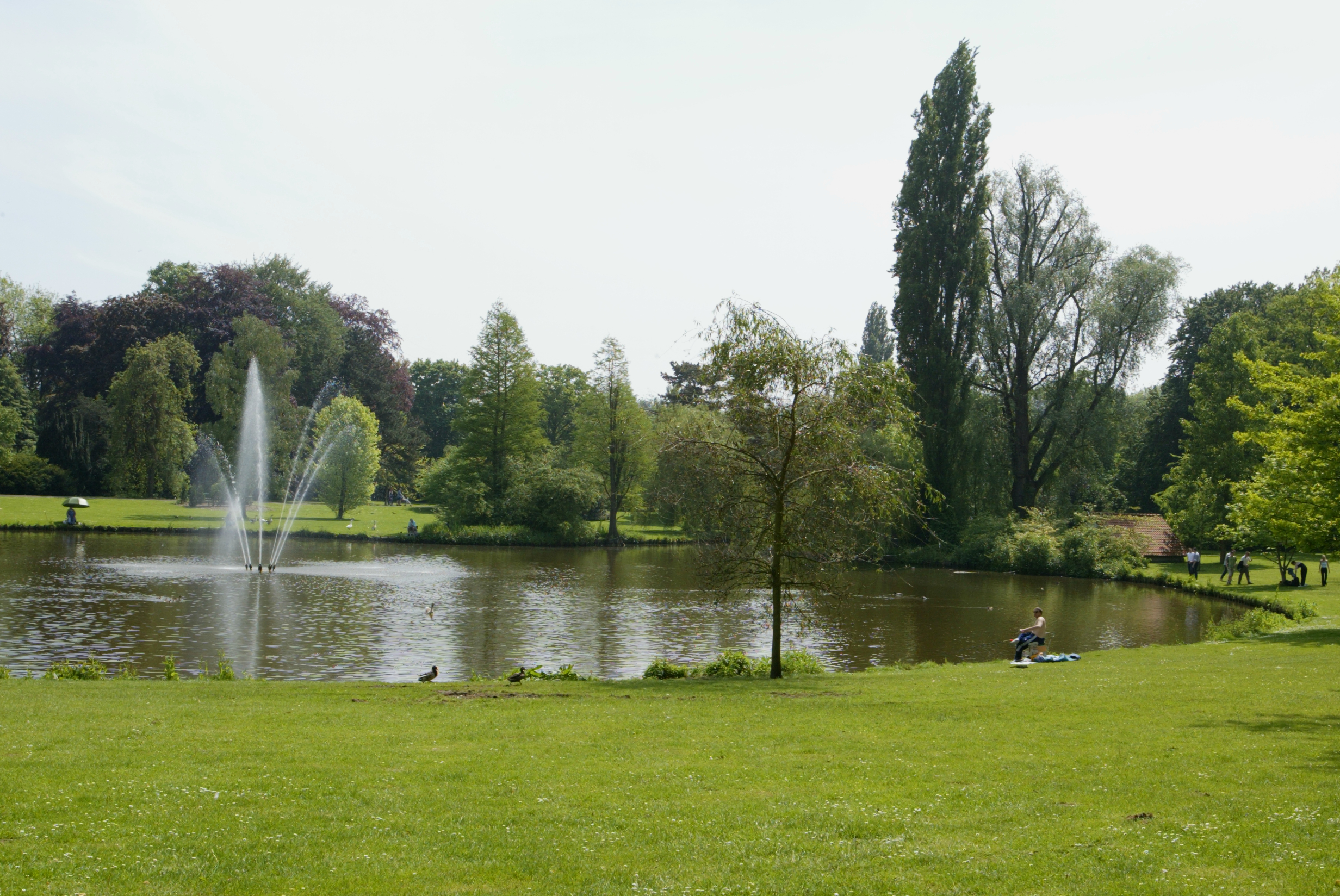
The balloon pond.

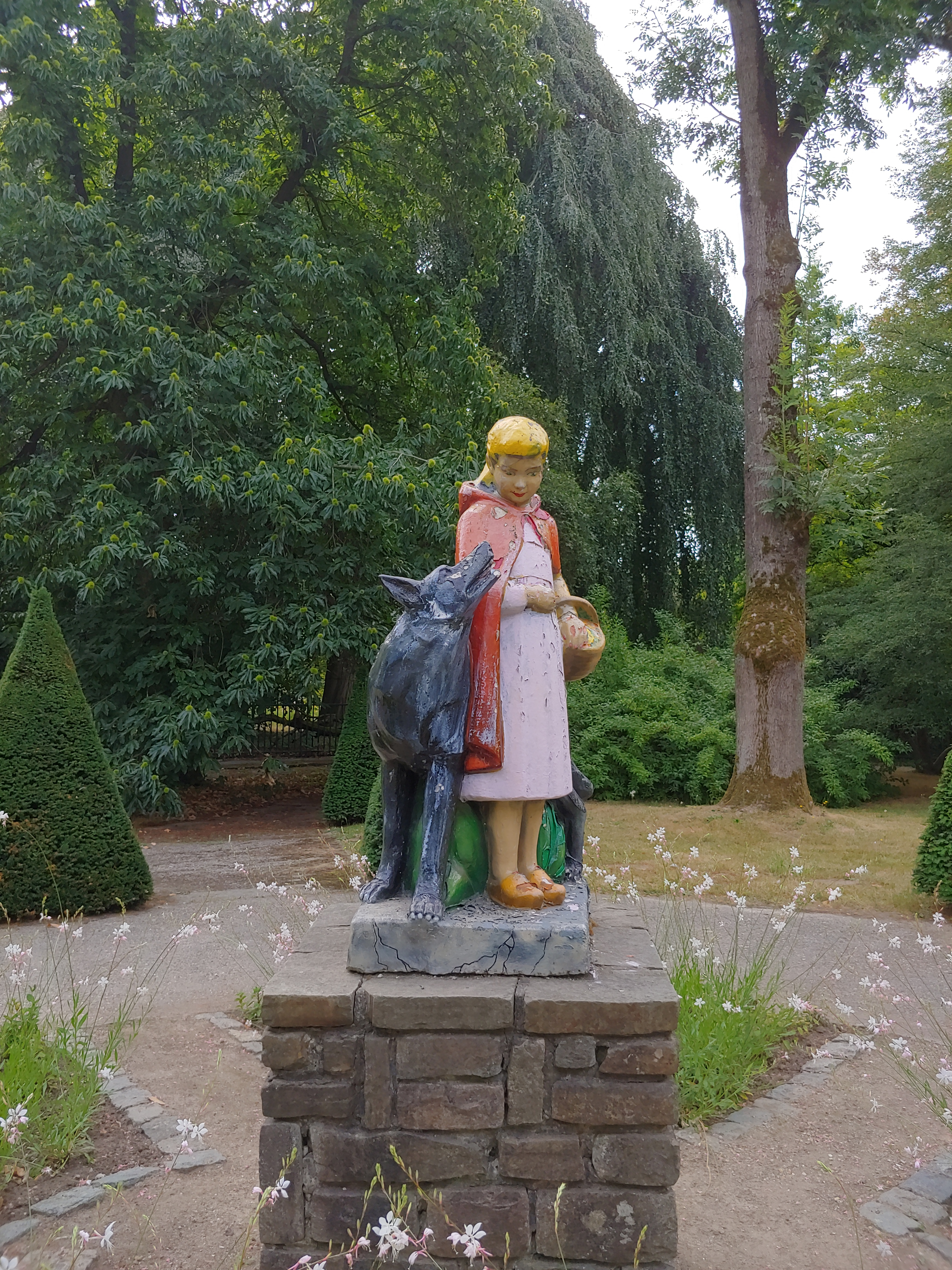
Little Red Riding Hood in the park.

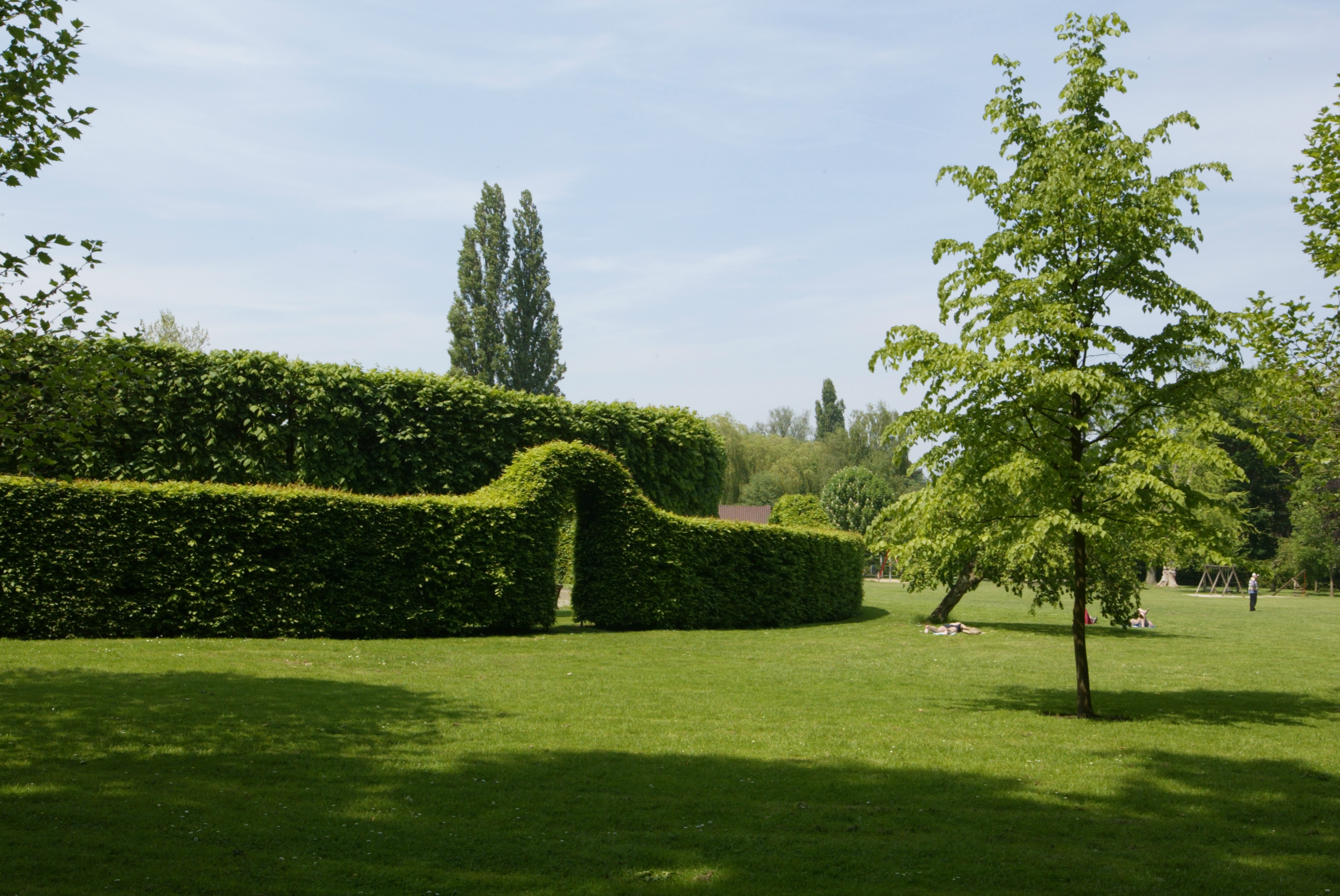
The maze.

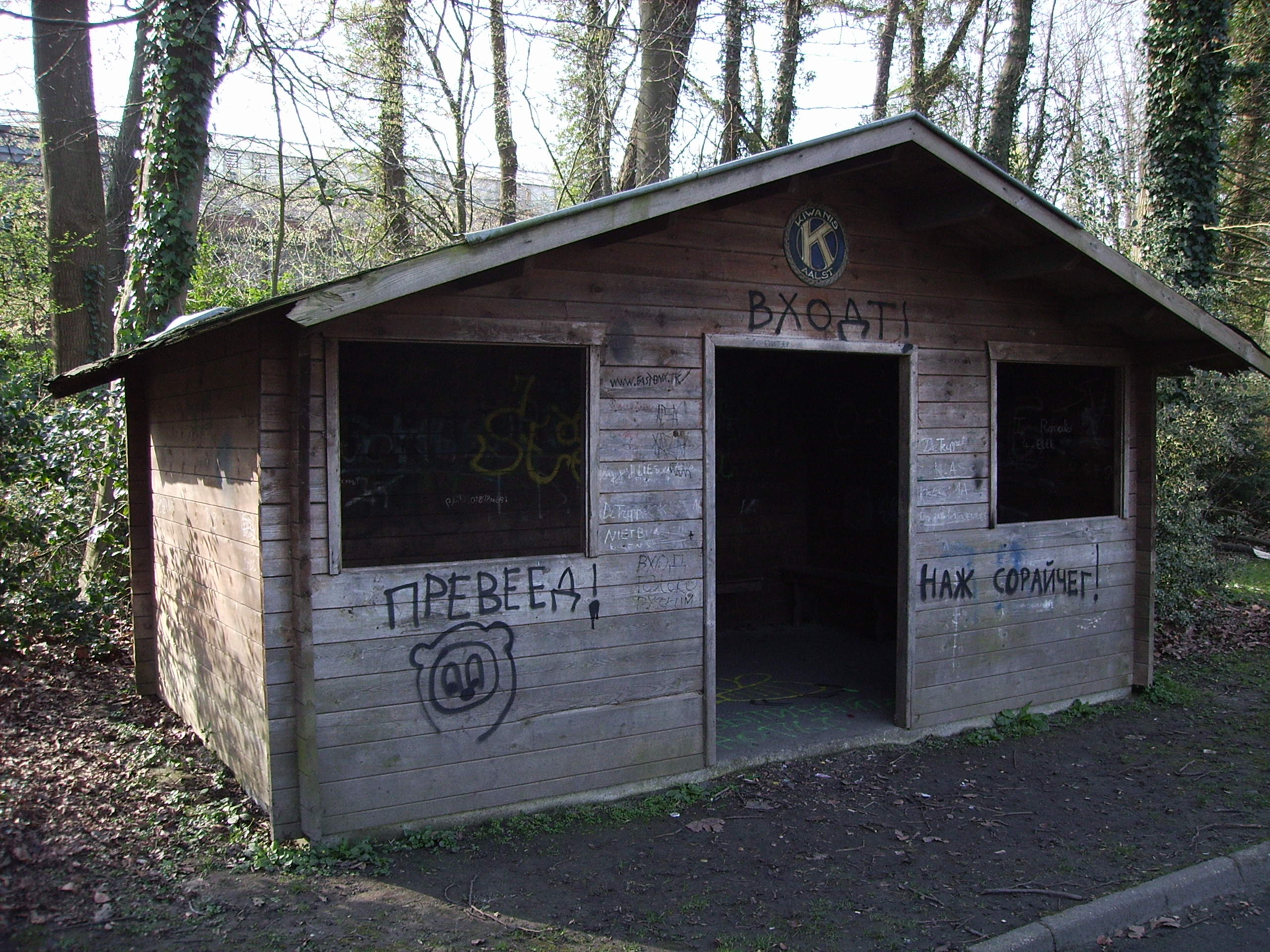
Preved in the city park.
