= D3.ru =

Russian community website

dirty.ru
- Website type: Communities Platform
- Available in: Russian
- Creator: Jovan Savovic
- Website: www.dirty.ru
- Commercial: No
- Registration: Optional
- Launched: November 22, 2001; 24 years ago
- Current status: Open

Dirty.ru is one of the first collaborative blogs in Runet. It is an online platform based on a rating system that allows users to appraise other individual users as well as content entries and comments posted by them. Unlike other widely known social networks d3.ru provides opportunities to vote against users, comments and content entries. Today the website is essentially a social network with communities of interest (featuring more than 4000 communities).Every single user has the opportunity to start a community. Within the D3.ru communities users can elect a president. The community president is then eligible to manage and operate the community.

The website's slogan is "D3.ru is an online platform for communities, where everyone is able to start a community — your voice matters!"

== History ==
The original Dirty.ru was founded by Jovan Savovic in 2001 as a platform for users to share and generate content. The website was launched on November 22, 2001. For the sake of quality, at the start of the website only registered users could post content, and registration required an invitation from another registered user (except for the short-term campaigns when the registration was open). It was made for users to follow simple grammar rules while commenting and keep a general polite attitude towards others. For those who broke the rules their profiles would be banned into a special section called "Leprosorium". In 2007 it grew into a separate website that is frequented by Sergey Dorenko, Alexei Navalny and others. Among former users Artemy Lebedev (banned in 2008) and Olga Shelest.

In 2007 the website went through Balkanization, a process, according to the website creators, opposite to globalization. Registration became open to the public but soon after became selective due to the high number of people who were willing to register.

Dirty became popular through Photoshop-festivals. Users organized spontaneous and preplanned posts with photoshopped images. The best images were saved to the Image archive, a website section where the most extraordinary works from participants were stored. In 2012 the website was rebooted and renamed to D3. Earlier the website had one single home page, after the remodel every community was given its own site. The main page now hosts all the newest and top-rated content of all users. (The website became open for registration, and communities could set-up for management.)

== ADM Club ==
Anonymous Ded Moroz Club (ADM) — was a popular campaign amongst users. During this time users can send each other New Year's presents. The user leaves his/her zipcode and receives a random zipcode of the other user. From that point the recipient is supposed to send a present to the address. Sender/receiver names remain a secret. In 2008-2009 ADM ran only among Leprosorium users, but in 2010 a separate campaign was specially held for Dirty users. In 2014 1038 also participated in the campaign. In 2020 there was 93 users.

ADM tips:

- While choosing the present, remember that the recipient may not have the same sense of humor.
- There have been cases where participants found their Anonymous Ded Moroz offline in real life.
- If you happen to still get a gift, do not unwrap it in the presence of your family members or children. It could be so that your ADM has not read these advices.

== Together ==
“Together” – D3 community users engaged in charitable projects. The community was organized in 2010 after the Tu-154 emergency landing. It occurred at an abandoned airport; maintained voluntarily by Sergey Sotnicov. Users were impressed by his actions. In order to express their gratitude towards Sergey Sotnicov they gave him a snowmobile.

== The Day of a Dead Horse ==
On July 7, 2010 the website experienced technical changes. In this time the registration was open to the public. Because of the technical maintenance the website's home page featured a picture of a dead horse. The number of users was so huge (5000 users registered within an hour) that registration was immediately closed. The users registered at that time were given a name “Children of a dead horse”.

== Current state ==
As of April 2015 the number of visitors amounted to 1,240,945 unique visitors per month, who made 17,044 entries, 251,839 comments for the specified period. 202 communities were being updated actively during this time.

== Users status and moderation system ==
Since 2006, each user has the opportunity to express their opinions on the site, by pressing the '+' or '–' button for comments and posts. In the same way, they can express their attitude to each individual user on their profile page. Depending on the number of the '+/-' entries the user receives, it is shown as a good or bad user “karma.” Some communities set restrictions and limitations on the karma level for making entries evaluating and commenting. If the user's karma level is too low they will not be able to post content. The user can give gifts to other users, or buy a gold account. The gold account does not use advertisements. It gives the user access to the golden communities as well as the ability to see what other users write about them in the information field in their profile. It also allows the user to put a title right next to the username — light form of donation as the website staff says.

== General rules ==
Spamming, manipulation with votes, posting confidential information about other users is prohibited. The website allows everything unless it is restricted by the federal law of Russian Federation e.g. posting illegal information, incite ethnic or religious hatred, call for suicide or promoting homosexuality or drug use. Any breaking of the website's rules the administration can ban any user. Communities can also make their own rules within themselves. If any of these rules are broken a community can ban that user.

== Types of entries ==
In addition to posting links to content, users post their own original entries. There are four formats of publications.

- Link entries — the shortest format for forwarding to certain content from other websites or publishing a single image, video or text.
- Gallery entries — for posting unlimited original images and descriptions in a specific field.
- Feature entries — possess the ample opportunities for processing content. In this post, the user can insert a photo, video and audio files. The user has access to change the outlines and text size with the use of the graphic symbols.

Entries graded by other users with more than one hundred pluses and less than three minuses become gold. Their author receives a star of honor, which is displayed on his/her profile page. Types of communities Communities are divided into open and closed (lists, karmas, or other grounds), with content available to the public, and other content is marked as 18+. The content covers a wide range of topics: from scientific innovations to sports news from the literary contributions to the image galleries of contemporary art. The communities are managed by their creators. However users can change their communities to become democratic, in those cases communities are run by an elected president and moderators. Community owner can go to settings and enable elections. In such a case, the owner passes on his obligations to the elected president. From that point he/she no longer is able to manage the community, and only is credited as a creator. The creator is able to turn off the election, returning everything back at any time.

== Regular updates ==
The site is regularly updated and improved. The administration of the website reports these updates on a special blog. Since the beginning of 2015 the website moderators brought back the feature that allows the weight of the vote to vary depending on user's karma, which determines the rating of posts or comments, for which the users vote. The administration added a section called "Pulse", which shows what is being discussed among D3 users, and fixed the search engine that has not worked for many years.

== Design ==
The logo of D3, a chicken, was taken from one of the works of surrealist artist Jeff Jordan. Next to the logo there is an image on each page which is called a D3 Geertruida (in honor of Mata Hari.) The D3 Geertruida changes with each updated page. The visual appearance of every community is a result of its managers or volunteers work.
