= Egor Lavrov =

Russian entrepreneur (born 1981)

- Born: June 4, 1981 (age 44)
- Occupation: businessman

Egor Sergeyevich Lavrov (Russian: Его́р Серге́евич Лавро́в; born June 4, 1981, Moscow, Soviet Union) is a Russian entrepreneur who made his money in IT-related projects, political PR, and a number of businesses in the United States and Latin America.

== Early years ==
Lavrov was born in Moscow, Russia. He studied at private school called Kommersant, spent a year in London and later moved to Prague, Czech Republic.

He finished school in Prague and came back to Moscow during a period of rising interest in the Internet in Russia. He later joined Plekhanov Institute of the National Economy and started his own business at the same time.

== Early political and business career ==
Lavrov's first business was the first Internet-related magazine in Russia called Planeta Internet. It was later sold to Smolensky Bank who paid about 2 million dollars to Lavrov when he was just 16 years old.

Lavrov's next step in business was the GFX Advertisement Company that later was acquired by the "Plaza Group" and transformed to "PLAZA Internet" that was a base for Internet projects of Egor Lavrov and Umar Dzhabrailov such as "obozrenie.ru" and "fuck.ru".

When Lavrov was 19 he became a head of the election campaign of Umar Dzhabrailov who ran for the President of Russia.

Dzhabrailov came in last with 0.8 percent of the vote but became Chechnya's representative in the Federation Council of Russia.

== Business ==
- "Friends Around": Geo-Aware Mobile Social Network
- Zila Networks
- Karma World
- "Pravda Group"
- "Russian Standard Group" - a company that distributes Apple, Inc. in Latin American market.
- ParagonCoin – Gibraltar-based startup that teamed-up with ICOBox and got the funds using ICO mechanism. In 2018, SEC settled non-fraud SEC registration charges.
