= Transphobia =

Anti-transgender prejudice

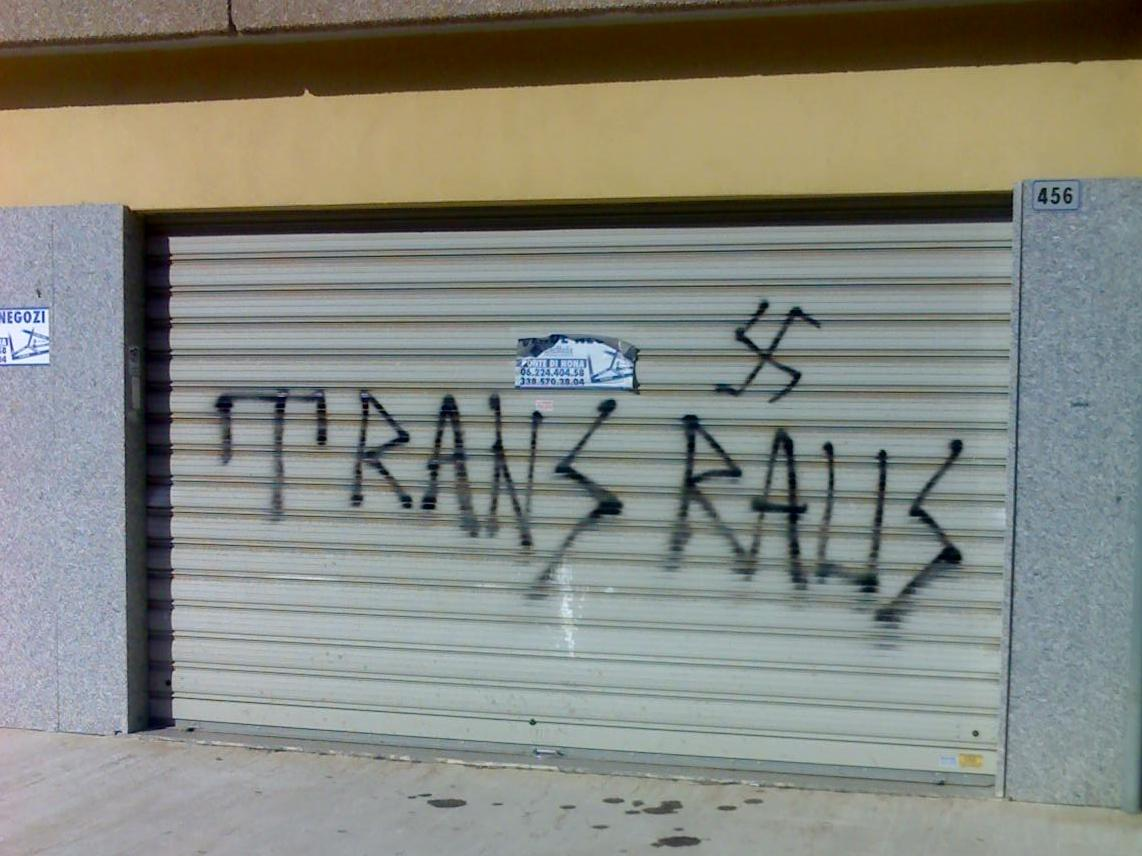
Transphobic graffiti in Rome, Italy, consisting of the text "trans out" in German, and a swastika.

Transphobia consists of negative attitudes, feelings, or actions towards transgender or transsexual people, or transness in general. Transphobia can include fear, aversion, hatred, violence or anger towards people who do not conform to social gender roles. Transphobia is a type of prejudice and discrimination, similar to racism, sexism, or ableism, and it is closely associated with homophobia. People of color who are transgender experience discrimination above and beyond that which can be explained as a simple combination of transphobia and racism.

Transgender youth often experience a combination of abuse from family members, sexual harassment, and bullying or school violence. They are also disproportionately placed in foster care and welfare programs compared to their peers. Adult transgender people regularly encounter sexual violence, police violence, public ridicule, misgendering, or other forms of violence and harassment in their daily lives. These issues cause many trans people to feel unsafe in public. Other issues include healthcare discrimination, workplace discrimination or feeling under siege by conservative political or religious groups who oppose LGBT-rights laws. Discrimination and violence sometimes originates from people within the LGBT community or feminist movements.

As well as increased risk of violence and other threats, the stress created by transphobia causes negative mental health outcomes and leads to drug use disorders, running away from home (in minors), and suicide.

In much of the Western world, there has been a gradual establishment of policies combatting discrimination and supporting equal opportunity in all aspects of life since the 1990s. The trend is also taking shape in some developing nations. In addition, campaigns regarding the LGBT community are being spread around the world to improve social acceptance of nontraditional gender identities. The "Stop the Stigma" campaign by the UN is one such example. However, transphobic violence has been on the rise since 2021, accompanied with an increase in anti-trans discriminatory laws being enacted in many countries.

== Etymology and use ==
The word transphobia is a classical compound patterned on the term homophobia. The first component is the neo-classical prefix trans- (originally meaning "across, on the far side, beyond") from transgender, and the second component -phobia comes from the Ancient Greek φόβος (phóbos, "fear"). Along with lesbophobia, biphobia and homophobia, transphobia is a member of the family of terms used when intolerance and discrimination is directed toward LGBT people.

Transphobia is not a phobia as defined in clinical psychology (i.e., an anxiety disorder). Its meaning and usage parallels xenophobia. The noun transphobe denotes someone who harbors transphobia. The adjectival form transphobic may be used to describe a transphobe or their actions. The words transphobia and transphobic were added to the Oxford English Dictionary in 2013.

== Origins ==
=== Research ===
According to a 2022 meta-analysis by Hailey A. Hatch and colleagues, a range of underlying factors contribute to transphobia. They found that the strongest predictor for transphobic attitudes were a person's corresponding attitudes towards lesbian, gay, or bisexual people, i.e., homophobia was strongly associated with transphobia. However, other factors were also statistically significant, including individual differences such as aggressiveness, gender role beliefs, demographics, and gender essentialism.

Rad et al. (2019) surveyed a sample of 1323 American adults, asking them to identify the gender of medically transitioned individuals. Biological changes resulted in identification more frequently aligning with self-identified gender than birth-assigned gender. Moreover, female surveyees were more likely to identify subjects by their self-identified gender. This difference was more pronounced in younger, more liberal, and less religious non-Midwestern respondents. The authors further showed that gender category beliefs (ratings of the transgender person's post-transition gender identity) were strongly associated with attitudes and feelings of warmth towards transgender people. However, gender category beliefs performed better in predicting bathroom policy preferences compared to feelings in unseen data, indicating that beliefs about what gender is and how it is determined are significantly linked to transphobia and support for anti-transgender policies. The authors argue that this pattern is consistent with theories that transphobia is rooted in a hierarchical social classification system where low-status groups (e.g., females) view the hierarchy in less essentialist ways than high-status groups (e.g., males).

=== Theory ===
Transfeminist theorist and author Julia Serano argues that the root of transphobia is "oppositional sexism", i.e. the belief that male and female are "rigid, mutually exclusive categories, each possessing a unique and nonoverlapping set of attributes, aptitudes, abilities, and desires". She contrasts this against the belief that males and masculinity are superior to females and femininity along with people's insecurities about gender and gender norms, which she calls "traditional sexism".

Other transgender rights authors argue that a significant part of the oppositional sexist origin of transphobia and violence towards transsexual people is linked to psychological claims of difference between male sexuality and female sexuality in the brain's protection mechanisms from committing sex crimes. These authors argue that the paradigm of acceptable sexual behavior that assumes men's sexual arousal is category-specific and women's sex drive is lower and more inhibited causes allegations that transsexual people have neither safety system in the brain and are therefore sex criminals. They argue that studies that claim to show such sex differences have flaws, such as the possibility that more men are deterred from participating in sexual arousal studies than women due to fear of being alleged to be inappropriately sexually aroused.

Some authors have linked transphobia's origins to colonialism, arguing that gendercide against third gender people carried out during the European colonization of the Americas reflect the historical roots of transphobia.

Sociologists McLean and Stretesky argue that "a veritable miasma of anti-trans campaign groups [...] united in their antipathy toward transgender people" has contributed to an anti-trans moral panic in the United Kingdom, which they link to authoritarian beliefs.

Transgender author and critic Jody Norton believes that transphobia is an extension of homophobia and misogyny. She argues that transgender people, like gays and lesbians, are hated and feared for challenging and undermining gender norms and the gender binary, and the "male-to-female transgender incites transphobia through her implicit challenge to the binary division of gender upon which male cultural and political hegemony depends".

Drawing on theory of radicalization, Craig McLean argues that discourse on transgender-related issues in the UK has been radicalized in response to the activities of what he terms the "anti-transgender movement," claiming that the movement pushes "a radical agenda to deny the basic rights of trans people (...) under the cover of 'free speech.'"

== Related concepts ==
Cissexism (also termed cisgenderism, and related to but distinct from cisnormativity or cissexual assumption) is the appeal to norms that enforce the gender binary and gender essentialism, resulting in the oppression of gender variant, non-binary, and transgender identities. Cissexism refers to the assumption that, due to human sexual differentiation, one's gender is determined solely by a biological sex of male or female (or, in the case of cisgenderism, a bivalent male or female expression), and that trans people are inferior to cisgender people. Cisgender privilege is the set of "unearned rights afforded to nontransgender people by virtue of the fact that they are not transgender", such as access to gender-segregated spaces and teams, lower exposure to gender-based violence, and easier access to gender-specific healthcare.

Harassment and violence directed against transgender people is often called trans bashing, and can be physical, sexual or verbal. Whereas gay bashing is directed against a target's real or perceived sexual orientation, trans bashing is directed against the target's real or perceived expressed gender identity. The term has also been applied to hate speech directed at transgender people and to depictions of transgender people in the media that reinforce negative stereotypes about them.

Transprejudice is a term similar to transphobia, and refers to the negative valuing, stereotyping, and discriminatory treatment of individuals whose appearance or identity does not conform to current social expectations or conventional conceptions of gender.

== Manifestations ==
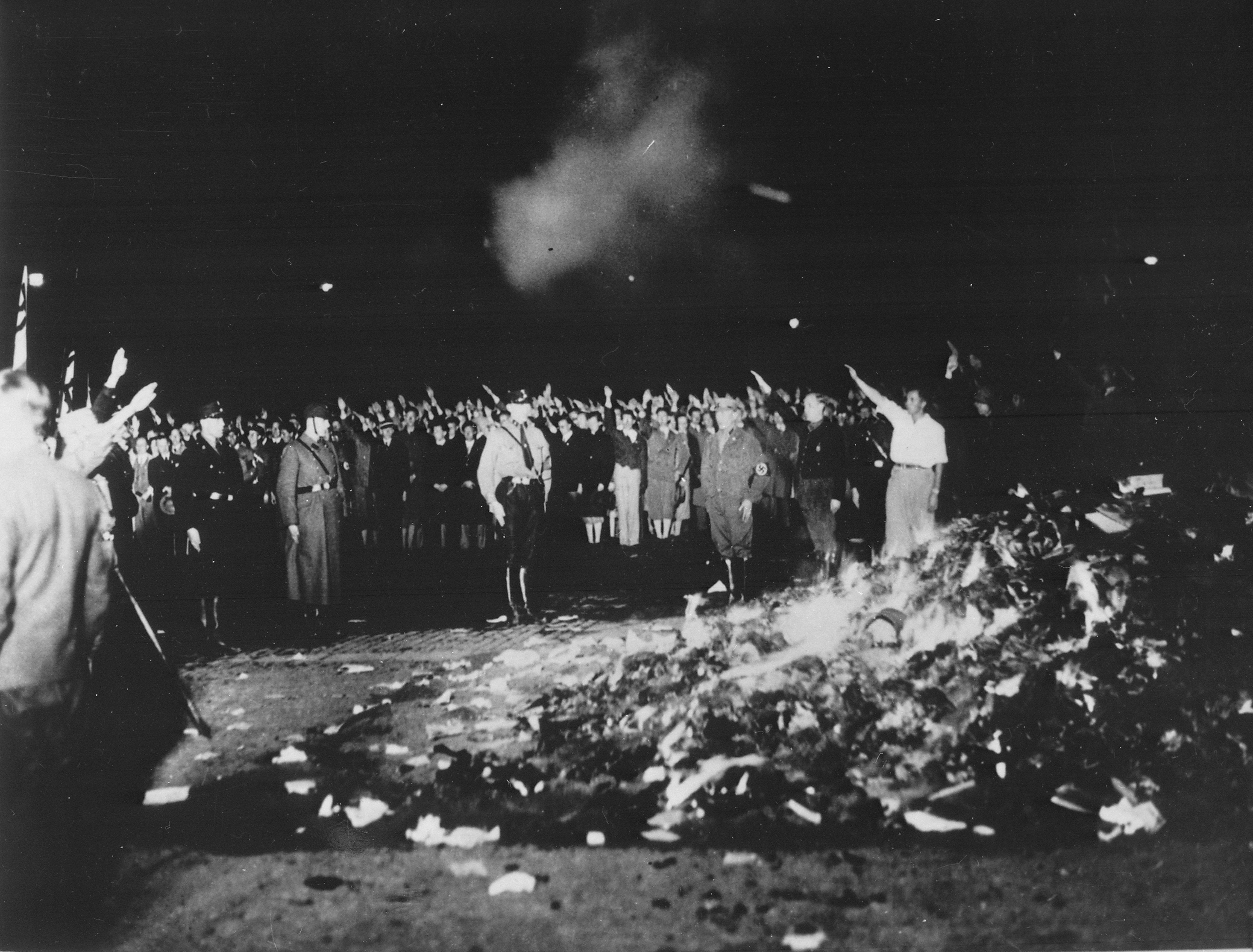
Nazis participate in a book burning of material from the Institut für Sexualwissenschaft which prominently included transgender research. May 11 1933.

=== Exclusion ===
Transgender people are often excluded from entitlements or privileges reserved for cisgender people of the same gender: for example, it is common for transgender women to be stopped or questioned when they use public bathrooms designated for women. Homeless shelters, hospitals and prisons have denied trans women admission to women's areas and forced them to sleep and bathe in the presence of men.

=== Harassment and violence ===
The stigma against transgender people often results in physical violence or bodily harm, sexual violence or assault, and verbal or emotional abuse. Transgender individuals are at increased risk for experiencing aggression and violence throughout their life when compared to cisgender individuals, especially when it comes to sexual violence. Other kinds of abuse include bullying, harassment, and multiple forms of discrimination. Abuse against transgender people can come from many different sources, including family and friends, partners, co-workers and acquaintances, strangers, and the police, and the abuse can occur at each developmental stage in life.

As homophobia and transphobia are correlated, many trans people experience homophobia and heterosexism due to people who associate trans people's gender identity with homosexuality, or because trans people may also have a sexual orientation that is non-heterosexual. Author Thomas Spijkerboer stated that "transgender people subjected to violence, in a range of cultural contexts, frequently report that transphobic violence is expressed in homophobic terms."

According to the American Psychological Association, transgender children are more likely than other children to experience harassment and violence in school, foster care, residential treatment centers, homeless centers, and juvenile justice programs. Researchers say trans youth routinely experience taunting, teasing and bullying at school, and that nearly all trans youth say they were verbally or physically harassed in school, particularly during gym class, at school events, or when using single-sex restrooms. Three-quarters report having felt unsafe.

As adults, transgender people are frequently subjected to ridicule, taunting, and threats of violence, even when just walking down the street or walking into a store. A U.S. survey of 402 older, employed, high-income transgender people found that 60% reported violence or harassment because of their gender identity. Among other things, 56% of the respondents reported being harassed or verbally abused, 30% reported being assaulted, and 8% reported unjustified arrest.

A study of 81 transgender people in Philadelphia found that 30% of the respondents reported feeling unsafe in public because they were transgender, with 19% feeling uncomfortable for the same reason. When asked if they had ever been forced to have sex, experienced violence in their home, or been physically abused, the majority answered yes to each question.

==== Sexual violence ====
In 2009, researcher Rebecca L. Stotzer published an article in Aggression and Violent Behavior that compiled information from numerous studies reporting violence against transgender people, describing it as "shockingly common" and noting that transgender people have a high risk of experiencing sexual violence throughout their lifetimes, and while reported rates vary considerably among studies for methodological and other reasons, the most common finding is that around 50% of transgender people have been sexually assaulted.

A meta-analysis on the rates of intimate partner violence found that transgender individuals are 66% more likely to experience violence of some kind from an intimate partner than cisgender subjects, and more than twice as likely to experience both sexual and physical intimate partner violence than their cisgender peers.

==== Physical violence ====
Perpetrators of physical violence against transgender people are reported to have been influenced by negative attitudes against transgender people, many of whom do not report their assault to the police. In the United States, the available homicide data suggests that transgender people are murdered at a lower rate than cisgender people. However, young Black and Latina trans women appear to be at greater risk of homicide than their cisgender peers.

=== Misgendering ===
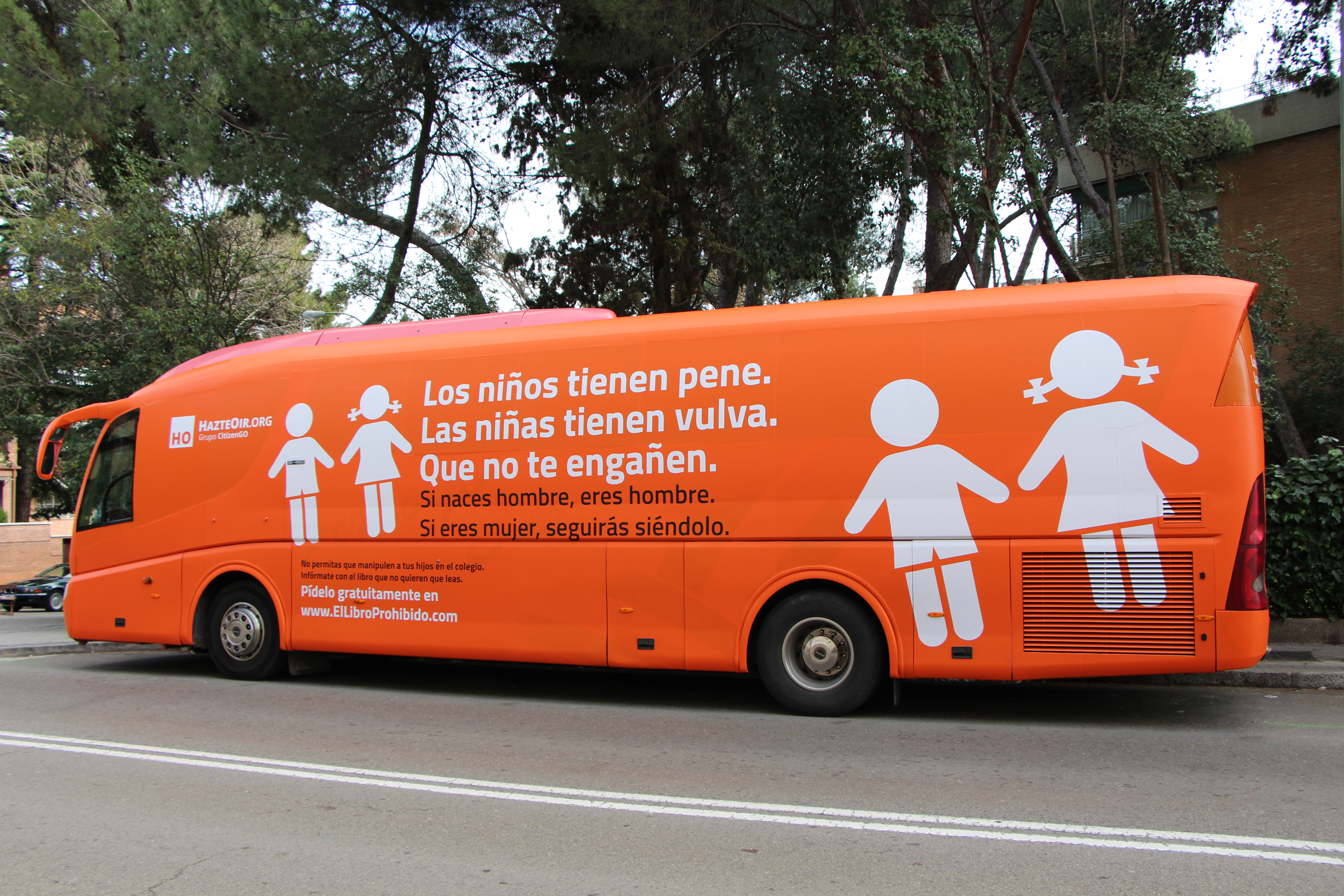
Bus used in a 2017 anti-transgender campaign by the right-wing Spanish organization HazteOir. Top text in Spanish translates to "Boys have a penis. Girls have a vulva. Don't let them deceive you. If you're born a man, you are a man. If you're a woman, you'll keep being one."

Misgendering is the act of labelling or referring to others with a gender that does not match their gender identity. It can be deliberate or accidental. Common examples include use of the wrong pronouns, use of the wrong honorific (e.g. "ma'am" or "sir"), and use of a former name ("deadnaming"). Some researchers also include being required to follow the norms of one's sex, for example in which bathroom to use.

Kelby Harrison writes that being misgendered is a common experience for transgender people before transition, and for many afterwards. Transgender people report being misgendered by doctors, police, media, and peers. Some writers have described the experience as "mortifying", cruel, and "only making our lives harder". A 2018 study of 129 transgender and other gender-expansive youth published in the Journal of Adolescent Health, found that "for each additional social context in which a youth's chosen name was used, there was a statistically significant decrease in depressive symptoms, suicidal ideation, and suicidal behaviors," though the study was "correlational so causality cannot be assumed, and the sample size was small." Deliberately misgendering a transgender person is considered offensive by transgender individuals.

== In society ==
=== In healthcare ===
A study of 81 transgender people in Philadelphia found 14% said they had been refused routine medical care because they were transgender. 18% answered 'yes' when asked if, when they went in for a check-up, "being transgender created a problem" for them.

Additionally, a study of 223 healthcare providers indicated a correlation between transphobia and decreased performance on survey questions regarding the treatment of transgender patients, with no significant correlation to the amount of time spent learning about transgender health, leading researchers to state that "broader efforts to address transphobia in society in general, and in medical education in particular, may be required to improve the quality of medical care for [transgender and gender diverse] patients."

In the United States–based National Center For Transgender Equality's 2011 survey, 19% of respondents reported being refused medical care due to their transgender or gender non-conforming status, such as Robert Eads, who died of ovarian cancer after being refused treatment by more than two dozen doctors due to fears that taking him on as a patient might harm their practice, or Tyra Hunter, who was involved in an automobile accident; when rescue workers discovered she was transgender, they backed away and stopped administering treatment. She later died in a hospital.

In many European countries, laws have required that transgender persons wishing to change their legal gender must first be sterilized. Sweden repealed its law in December 2012, and so did Norway in 2014. In 2017 the European Court of Human Rights ruled that this requirement was a violation of human rights (specifically Article 8 of the European Convention on Human Rights).

=== In the workplace ===
Transphobia also manifests itself in the workplace. Some transgender people lose their jobs when they begin to transition and a 1995 study from Willamette University stated that a transgender person fired for following the recommended course of treatment rarely wins it back through federal or state statutes.

A survey of 392 trans women and 123 trans men conducted by the San Francisco Department of Public Health in 1997 and released in 1999 found that 40% of trans women surveyed had earned money from full or part-time employment over the preceding six months. For trans men, the equivalent statistic was 81%. The survey also found that 46% of trans women and 57% of trans men reported employment discrimination. The Associated Press and the Out Traveler later reported the San Francisco Department of Public Health had found 70% of trans respondents in San Francisco were unemployed.

A 2002 American study found that among educators, trans educators are 10–20% more likely to experience workplace harassment than their gay and lesbian colleagues.

In the hiring process, discrimination may be either open or covert, with employers sometimes finding other ostensible reasons to not hire a candidate. Additionally, when an employer fires a transgender employee, it may be a "mixed motive" case, with the employer openly citing obvious wrongdoing or job performance issues while keeping silent in regards to transphobia.

Employment discrimination on the basis of gender identity and expression is illegal in the United States. Such discrimination is outlawed by specific legislation in the State of New Jersey and might be in other states (as it is in the states of California, Illinois, Maine, Minnesota, New Mexico and Washington) or city ordinances; additionally, it is covered by case law in some other states. (For example, Massachusetts is covered by cases such as Lie vs. Sky Publishing Co. and Jette vs. Honey Farms.) Several other states and cities prohibit such discrimination in public employment. Sweden and the United Kingdom have also legislated against employment discrimination on the grounds of gender identity. Sometimes, however, employers discriminate against transgender employees in spite of such legal protections. In 2000, the southern U.S. grocery chain Winn-Dixie fired long-time employee Peter Oiler, despite a history of repeatedly earning raises and promotions, after management learned that Oiler identified as transgender and occasionally cross-dressed off the job. Management argued that this hurt Winn-Dixie's corporate image. The American Civil Liberties Union filed a lawsuit against Winn-Dixie on behalf of Oiler, but a judge dismissed it.

Transgender people facing employment discrimination may turn to sex work to survive, placing them at additional risk of encountering troubles with the law, including arrest and criminal prosecution, workplace violence, the risk of contracting sexually transmitted diseases such as HIV. Lack of employment has also resulted in the transgender community resorting to illegal means of earning money such as drug-dealing.

A study conducted by Anneliese Singh and Vel McKleroy on transgender people of color revealed that difficulty finding a job or losing a job due to transphobia resulted in some respondents living in crime-ridden neighborhoods and getting involved in abusive relationships. A 2021 study in the Journal of Career Development looked at 18 Latino transgender immigrants to the United States and found five themes related to these participants' experiences while seeking employment: discrimination, limited options, positive experiences, and disability benefits as financial relief.

=== From government ===
Voter identification laws in the United States often impact transgender individuals' ability to vote, since many lack photo identification with their current name and gender.

Prisons frequently make no attempt to accommodate transgender individuals, assigning them to facilities using only the criteria of genitalia, which is believed to contribute to the pervasiveness of prison rape with regards to transgender women. Prison staff have been noted to frequently deny trans women privileges disproportionately, and the Eighth Amendment right for an individual not to be given cruel or unusual punishment has historically not been liberally enforced in cases involving transgender inmates.

In July 2023, Russia enacted a law which had, among other measures, banned gender-affirming healthcare for all transgender people regardless of age and had also banned them from adopting children.

Transgender people also face the denial of right of asylum or inhuman treatment in process of asylum-seeking.

=== In education ===
Within the school system, many transgender teens are harassed and mistreated with reported negative effects on both victim and the school's population in general. Transgender youth frequently report fear and anxiety about using restrooms and locker rooms at school because of harassment by both peers and adults when using them. Over 80% of transgender teens report feeling unsafe in a school environment, more than 40% report having been physically abused, and over 65% report being bullied online or via social media. Such discrimination is generally underreported, and school officials may even participate in transphobic name-calling or victim-blaming. Additionally, administrative practices such as misgendering students in school records can contribute to transgender students' distress in school.

A study done on Canadian high school students between December 2007 and June 2009 illustrated how the LGBTQ students felt unsafe at the school and were exposed to insults and discrimination by their peers and sometimes even by their teachers.

=== Online ===
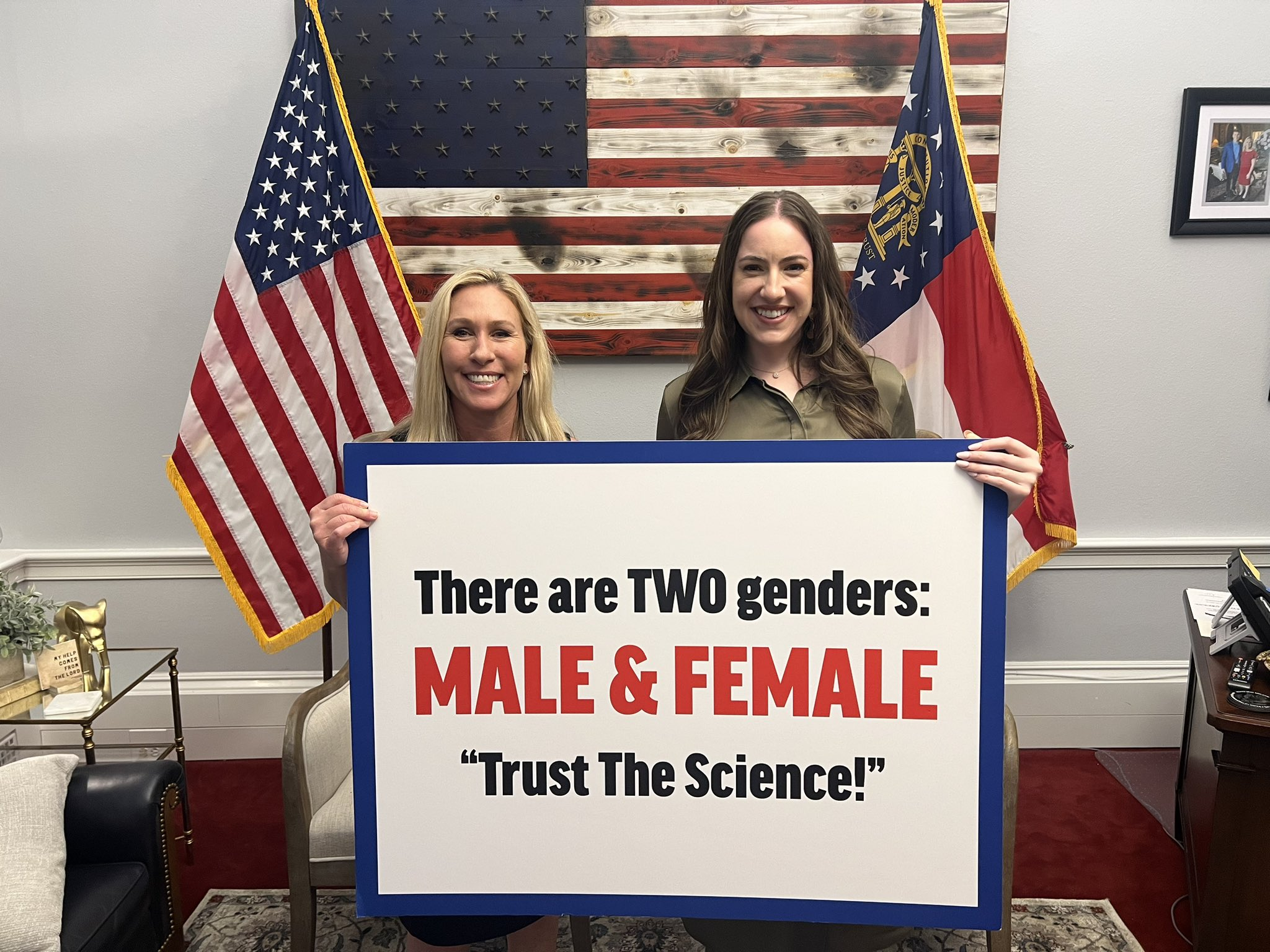
Georgia U.S. Representative Marjorie Taylor Greene (left) and Libs of TikTok creator Chaya Raichik (right) holding a sign claiming there are exactly two genders. Greene posted this image to Twitter with the caption "@libsoftiktok knows the truth!"

Online transphobia remains a growing problem across various online spaces. A study by Brandwatch analyzing over ten million posts in transgender-related discussions on various social media platforms between 2015 and 2019 found over 1.5 million transphobic posts. These posts varied from promoting transphobic sentiment to advocating for anti-transgender violence and genocide.

Transgender people are often victims of online harassment and experience higher reported levels of online harassment compared to their cisgender heterosexual counterparts. One study on transphobic cyberbullying by Evelyn et al. found that participants most frequently reported being bullied on social media platforms, alongside frequently reporting bullying in online video games and dating apps. Most of the bullying was found to be from anonymous users or people unknown to the participants, and often in the form of transphobic insults, intersectional sexist, homophobic and/or racist insults, outing their identity, threats of harm, and sexual harassment. Participants even reported transphobic cyberbullying from other transgender individuals, usually by policing or outing their identity.

Online transphobia has potential to lead to real-world violence and threats. An example of this is when far-right Twitter account Libs of TikTok made a series of posts spreading misinformation that Boston Children's Hospital was performing hysterectomies on minors. This led to a series of death threats and bomb threats being made against the hospital and individual physicians, and individual physicians being doxxed and harassed in person. Libs of TikTok has similarly posted about several other LGBT-themed events, such as Drag Queen Story Hours, often leading to said events receiving mass threats of violence and being canceled or postponed by organizers.

The LGBT grooming conspiracy theory—claiming that LGBTQ people and allies are systematically grooming children—has been promoted online by both users and mainstream politicians such as Marjorie Taylor Greene and Lauren Boebert. Former US President Donald Trump claimed in a video posted to Truth Social on 31 January 2023, that "the left-wing gender insanity being pushed at our children is an act of child abuse" and that if re-elected, he would pass numerous laws significantly limiting gender-affirming care for minors. One study on Twitter found that use of the term "groomer" in tweets spiked on multiple occasions, including the passing of the Florida Parental Rights in Education Act, the signing into law of said act, and Twitter posting a statement that tweets calling transgender or nonbinary people "groomers" violates its hate speech policy.

Despite Twitter's prior public stance against transphobia and homophobia on its platform, the company was criticized by organizations such as the Human Rights Campaign for being inefficient. One audit by the organization found that Twitter failed to act on 99 out of 100 of the most viewed anti-LGBT tweets between January and July 2022. The acquisition of Twitter by Elon Musk has led to a significant increase in hate speech, especially in terms of anti-LGBTQ content. Following Musk's takeover, tweets linking LGBT people to grooming rose by 119%, and retweets and mentions of right-wing figures' anti-LGBT tweets increased by over 1200%. Under Elon Musk, Twitter has also relaxed transgender hate speech policies, such as misgendering. GLAAD described Twitter as "the most dangerous platform for LGBTQ people", ranking the lowest on its Social Media Safety Index.

Similarly, a 2020 study on Facebook by Media Matters for America found that right-leaning sources took up a vast majority of interactions in transgender topics compared to left-leaning or queer sources, with anti-LGBT outlets such as The Daily Wire and LifeSiteNews earning the highest engagements out of any source analyzed in the study.

=== In religion ===
==== In Christianity ====
In North America, organizations associated with the Christian right, including the American Family Association, Family Research Council, Focus on the Family, National Association for Research and Therapy of Homosexuality, believe that "transgenderism" is unnatural and that transgender people are and remain the sex they were assigned at birth. These organizations oppose laws and policies intended to accommodate transgender people, such as allowing them to change their legal sex, use the washroom corresponding to the gender with which they identify, or become ordained Christian ministers. It is their position that God created people's bodies as they are meant to be, that accepting transgender people would violate scripture and natural law, and that the Bible refers to male and female only.

According to the Ontario Consultants for Religious Tolerance website, under Pope John Paul II, the Holy See first stated its opposition to reassignment surgery in 2000, although it was not made public until 2003.

Transgender people face particular challenges in attempting to integrate their faith with their gender identity. One author says "expectations [based on gender] are usually predicated upon our genitalia and begin from the moment of birth, continuing throughout our lives." Many Christian denominations use biblical notions of gender and gender roles to support their views. These include "So God created man in His own image, in the image of God He created him; male and female He created them" (Genesis 1:27) and "The woman shall not wear that which pertaineth unto a man, neither shall a man put on a woman's garment: for all that do so are an abomination unto the Lord thy God" (Deuteronomy 22:5).

Views of gender identity based on the Christian faith do not always coincide with the perspectives of transgender individuals. However, if they do not conform to these expectations, they may face rejection. Many transgender Christians seek out an "individualized relationship with God", often facing "a period of denial and struggle" as well as depression, disconnection, dissatisfaction, and spiritual difficulty before "discovering a sense of self that feels integral and true". Many transgender individuals face barriers within the church, such as "fear and unfamiliarity on the part of the congregation, language issues, physical layout that separates people by gender, programs that exclude or separate by gender, pathologizing or designating trans issues as sinful, and overt hostility".

==== In Islam ====
The Islamic faith has historically supported heteronormative, binary gender identification. This support is reinforced by cultural norms and traditional readings of sacred texts which prohibit a wide range of identities. Despite this history, progressive Muslims have built arguments that support transgender Muslims on long-established doctrine, and support for gender transition has even been found among influential conservative scholars.

In 1988, gender reassignment surgery was declared acceptable under Islamic law by scholars at Egypt's Al-Azhar, the world's oldest Islamic university. In Iran during 1987, Ayatollah Khomeini, the supreme religious leader of the Islamic Republic of Iran at that time, also declared transgender surgical operations as acceptable (see transgender rights in Iran). The foundation for this accepting attitude in contrast to intolerance of homosexuality is the belief that a person is born transgender but chooses to be homosexual. Despite this acceptance among some conservative Muslim scholars and leaders, transgender individuals within the Muslim community still face particular challenges.

Today, there are some Muslim communities that explicitly welcome transgender Muslims, including some which have trans leadership. Masjid Al-Rabia, founded in 2017, is a trans-led, women-centred, LGBTQ+ affirming mosque based in Chicago, IL. In Northampton, Massachusetts, the Pioneer Valley Progressive Muslims (Masjid Al-Inshirah) was founded in 2010 by a transgender Muslim. Muslims for Progressive Values has founded Unity Mosques in Atlanta, Georgia; Columbus, Ohio; and Los Angeles, California; as well as outside the United States. The Muslim Alliance for Sexual and Gender Diversity hosts an annual retreat for LGBTQ+ Muslims in Pennsylvania each May. The Trans and Muslim Project of TransFaith is a project devoted specifically to the support of transgender Muslims.

=== In language ===
Transphobia can manifest in attacks on inclusive language. Dorothee Beck writes that gender-inclusive language "is a trigger point for 'anti-gender' attacks," and describes it as "an important aspect of a broader political 'crusade' against gender." Lucy Jones writes, in her review of scholarly literature on language, gender, and sexuality, that anti-gender and gender-critical actors often resist the adoption of inclusive and nonbinary language, particularly in relation to pronouns and the recognition of transgender and nonbinary identities. Jones notes that gender-critical actors frequently reject linguistic practices that affirm trans and nonbinary identities, often citing the preservation of "sex-based rights" as justification. She observes that this resistance is typically framed by a binary and essentialist ideology that defines "woman" exclusively as someone assigned female at birth. Drawing on this scholarship, Jones characterizes gender-critical resistance to inclusive language as part of a broader "cisnormative preoccupation with trans people's bodies" and a form of linguistic policing aimed at denying the legitimacy of trans and nonbinary identities. Jones situates these discursive patterns within a wider political context by citing Borba (2022), who examines the emergence of an "anti-gender register" used in trans-exclusionary discourse, including gender-critical feminism. Borba argues that this register, which draws on essentialist ideas about sex and gender, has gained traction through a process of enregisterment, a way of making certain ideological positions appear natural or commonsensical. He further suggests that this has been achieved in part by appropriating the language of feminist and LGBTQ+ antidiscrimination activism, reframing it to emphasize threats to the rights of cisgender women and children.

=== In law ===
Scholars have highlighted the activity of anti-trans voices in international legal arenas in the 2020s. Legal scholars Tamsin Phillipa Paige and Claerwen O'Hara describe what they call an increasingly aggressive anti-queer and transphobic movement that is now active also in legal circles, citing the activities of Reem Alsalem as a prominent example.

=== In science ===
Scientific transphobia is the use of scientific language, selective evidence, or flawed research methods to pathologize, delegitimize, or deny the identities of transgender and gender non-conforming people, often through claims that sex is a strictly binary and immutable biological category. It involves the misapplication or distortion of fields such as genetics, endocrinology, neuroscience, and psychology despite the current scientific consensus that transgender identities are not pathological, and researchers have warned against the misinterpretation and misuse of biological studies on gender identity.

== In feminism ==
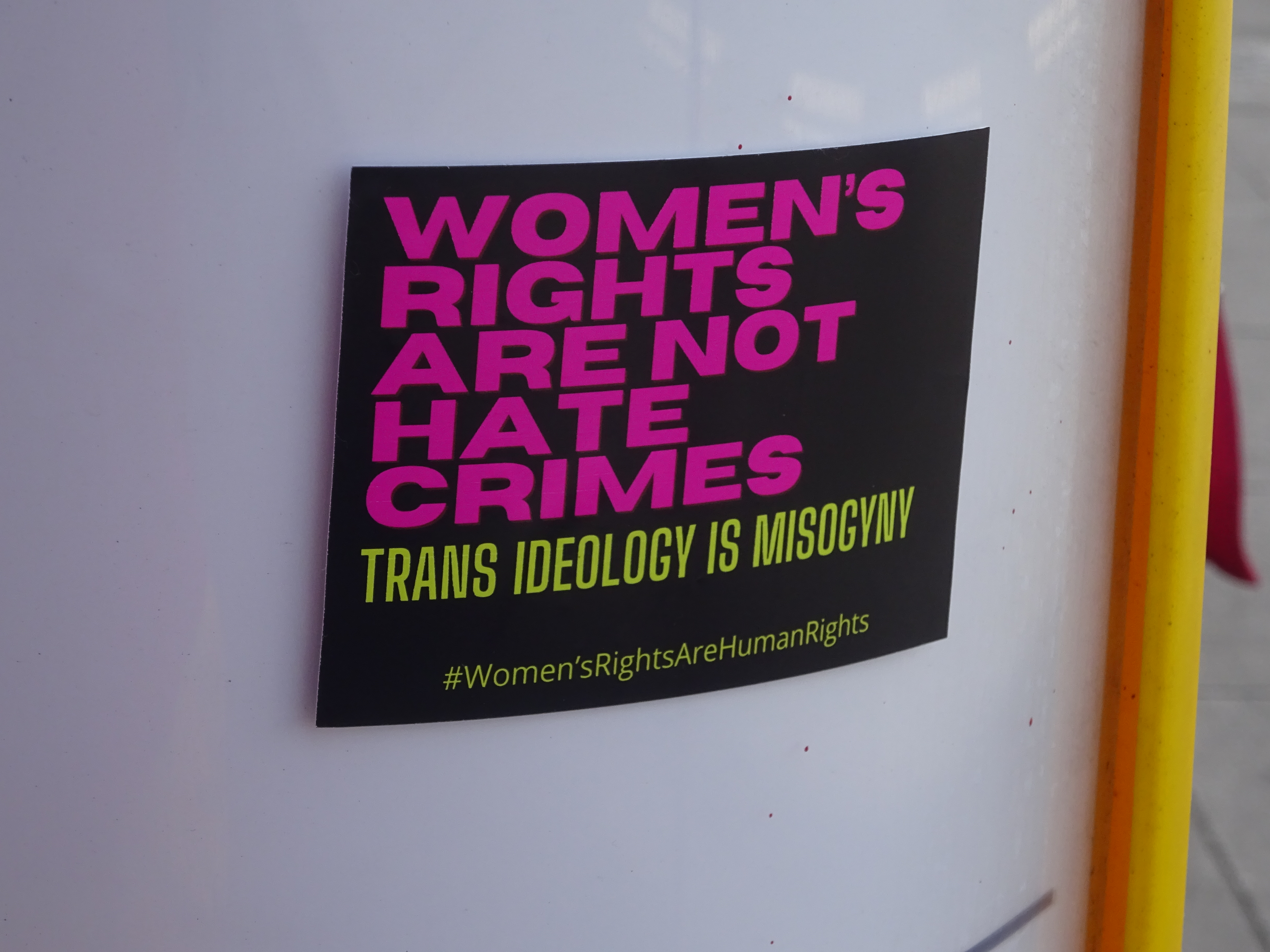
A transphobic sticker. It says "Women's rights are not hate crimes. Trans ideology is misogyny"

In her cross-cultural study on prejudice against transgender people, social psychologist Jaime L. Napier found that while prejudice against transgender people is more common in men, it is also found among women, including some self-identified feminists, highlighting Sweden as an outlier and the only country in her research where anti-trans prejudice was more common among women.

Some positions within feminism, such as trans-exclusionary radical feminism, are considered transphobic. This may include criticism of transitioning or sex reassignment surgery (SRS) as a personal choice or medical invention, or the position that trans women are not women in a literal sense and should not be allowed access to women-only spaces. Some second-wave feminists perceive trans men and women respectively as "traitors" and "infiltrators" to womanhood.

Activist Gloria Steinem expressed concerns in 1977 about transsexuality and SRS, writing that in many cases, transsexuals "surgically mutilate their own bodies." She concluded that "feminists are right to feel uncomfortable about the need for and uses of transsexualism." For some years, this led to Steinem being characterized as transphobic. In 2013, she repudiated the interpretation of her text as an altogether condemnation of SRS, stating that her position was informed by accounts of gay men choosing to transition as a way of coping with societal homophobia. She added that she sees transgender people as living "authentic lives" that should be "celebrated".

Radical feminist Janice Raymond's 1979 book, The Transsexual Empire, was and is still controversial due to its unequivocal condemnation of transsexual surgeries. In the book Raymond says, "All transsexuals rape women's bodies by reducing the real female form to an artifact, appropriating this body for themselves .... Transsexuals merely cut off the most obvious means of invading women, so that they seem non-invasive" and that trans people should be "morally mandated out of existence".

Another site of conflict between feminists and trans women has been the Michigan Womyn's Music Festival. In the early 1990s, the festival ejected a transsexual woman, Nancy Burkholder. In 2014, the festival "passionately rejected" accusations that it believed transgender women are "less than" other women. The activist group Camp Trans had protested the "womyn-born-womyn" intention and advocated for greater acceptance of trans women within the feminist community. The festival had considered allowing only post-operative trans women to attend, but this was criticized as classist, as many trans women cannot afford sex reassignment surgery.

Trans women such as Sandy Stone challenged the feminist conception of "biological woman". Stone worked as a sound engineer for Olivia Records from about 1974 to 1978, resigning as the controversy over a trans woman working for a lesbian-identified enterprise increased. The debate continued in Raymond's book, which devoted a chapter to criticism of "the transsexually constructed lesbian-feminist." Groups like Lesbian Organization of Toronto then voted to exclude trans lesbians. Sheila Jeffreys described "transgenderism" as "deeply problematic from a feminist perspective and [stated] that transsexualism should be seen as a violation of human rights."

The work of poststructuralist feminist and lesbian Judith Butler, particularly their books Gender Trouble (1990) and Bodies That Matter (1993), argues that the "violent inscription" of gender as a social construct on human bodies leads to violence against those who do not conform to such binaristic gender dichotomies.

Feminists who oppose the inclusion of trans women in women's spaces have been labeled "TERFs", short for "trans-exclusionary radical feminists". Some of those at whom the term is directed, in turn, have perceived their labeling as "TERF" to be a slur.

== In gay, lesbian, and bisexual communities ==
Transphobia is documented in the lesbian, gay and bisexual communities, despite historic cooperation between these communities in campaigns for equality.

Authors and observers, such as transgender author Jillian Todd Weiss, have written that "there are social and political forces that have created a split between gay/lesbian communities and bisexual/transgender communities, and these forces have consequences for civil rights and community inclusion. 'Biphobia' and 'transphobia' are a result of these social and political forces, not psychological forces causing irrational fears in aberrant individuals."

=== Gay and lesbian communities ===
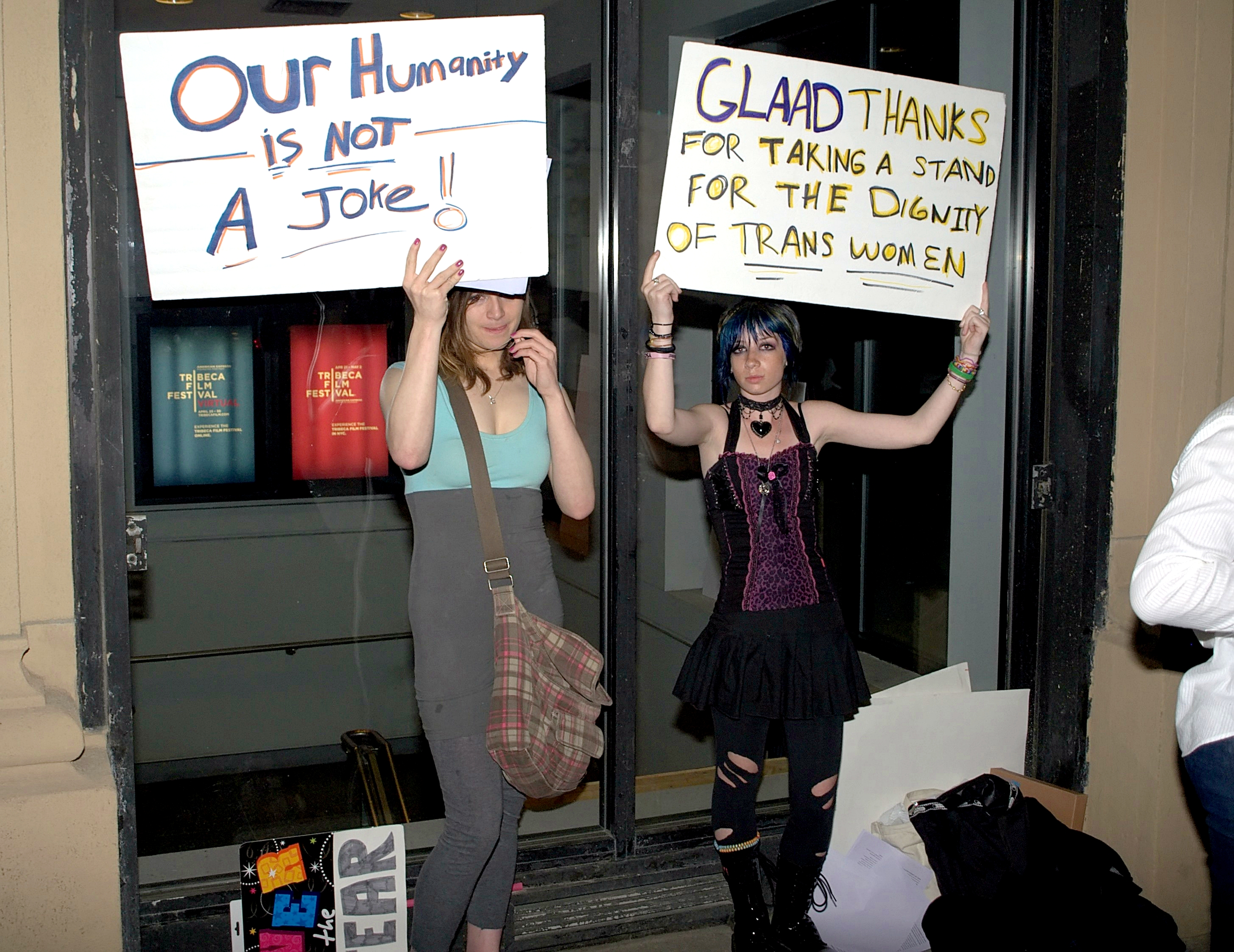
Protesters outside the 2010 premiere of Ticked-Off Trannies with Knives, written and directed by gay filmmaker Israel Luna, objecting to what they considered to be transphobic portrayals in the film and its trailer, which referred to several notable real-life murders of transgender people before being taken down

Historian Joanne Meyerowitz documented transphobia within the gay rights movement in the mid 20th century in response to publicity surrounding the transition of Christine Jorgensen. Jorgensen, who made frequent homophobic remarks and insisted she was not connected to or identified with gay men, was a polarizing figure among activists:

In 1953, for example, ONE magazine published a debate among its readers as to whether gay men should denounce Jorgensen. In the opening salvo, the author Jeff Winters accused Jorgensen of a "sweeping disservice" to gay men. "As far as the public knows," Winters wrote, "you were merely another unhappy homosexual who decided to get drastic about it." For Winters, Jorgensen's story simply confirmed the false belief that all men attracted to other men must be basically feminine," which, he said, "they are not." Jorgensen's precedent, he thought, encouraged the "reasoning" that led "to legal limitations upon the homosexual, mandatory injections, psychiatric treatment – and worse." In the not-so-distant past, scientists had experimented with castrating gay men.

— Joanne Meyerowitz

Several prominent figures in second wave feminism have also been accused of transphobic attitudes, culminating in 1979 with the publication of The Transsexual Empire by radical lesbian feminist Janice Raymond, who popularized the term shemale as a derogatory slur referring to trans women in 1994. Her statements on transsexuality and transsexual people have been criticized by many in the LGBT and feminist communities as extremely transphobic and constituting hate speech.

In 1950s America, there was a debate among gay men and women about those who felt they were of the opposite sex. Gay men and women who were trying to melt quietly into the majority society criticized them as "freaks" who brought unwanted disreputable attention upon them. Such attitudes were widespread at the time.

Some trans men face rejection from lesbian communities they had been part of prior to transition. Journalist Louise Rafkin writes, "there are those who are feeling curiously uncomfortable standing by as friends morph into men. Sometimes there is a generational flavor to this discomfort; many in the over-40 crowd feel particular unease", stating that this was "shaking the foundation of the lesbian-feminist world". Trans men were part of the protest at the 2000 Michigan Womyn's Music Festival, the first time the 'womyn-born womyn only' policy has been used against trans males, women supporting the transgender community and young gender-variant women.

In the early 1970s, conflicts began to emerge due to different syntheses of lesbian, feminist and transgender political movements, particularly in the United States. San Francisco trans activist and entertainer Beth Elliott became the focus of debate over whether to include transgender lesbians in the movement, and she was eventually blacklisted by her own movement.

=== Bisexual communities and binarism ===
One view is that the word bisexual is transphobic, as "bi" means "two" (thus implying a belief in the binary view of gender). Some people, such as scholar Shiri Eisner, say that some make the claim that the term "erases nonbinary genders and sexes out of existence", as many dictionaries define bisexuality as "of, relating to, or having a sexual orientation to persons of either sex", "sexually attracted to both men and women" and other similar definitions.

However, some bisexual individuals and scholars object to the notion that bisexuality means sexual attraction to only two genders, arguing that since bisexual is not simply about attraction to two sexes and encompasses gender as well, it can include attraction to more than one or more than two genders and is occasionally defined as such. Others, such as the American Institute of Bisexuality, say that the term "is an open and inclusive term for many kinds of people with same-sex and different-sex attractions" and that "the scientific classification bisexual only addresses the physical, biological sex of the people involved, not the gender-presentation."

To deal with issues related to transphobia and the gender binary, some individuals have taken on terms such as pansexual, omnisexual, or polysexual in place of the term bisexual. The American Institute of Bisexuality argues that these terms "describe a person with homosexual and heterosexual attractions, and therefore people with these labels are also bisexual" and that the notion that bisexuality is a reinforcement of a gender binary is a concept that is founded upon "anti-science, anti-Enlightenment philosophy that has ironically found a home within many Queer Studies departments at universities across the Anglophone world". Eisner agrees with this view, stating that "allegations of binarism have little to do with bisexuality's actual attributes or bisexual people's behavior in real life" and that the allegations are an attempt to separate the bisexual and transgender communities politically.

== Consequences ==
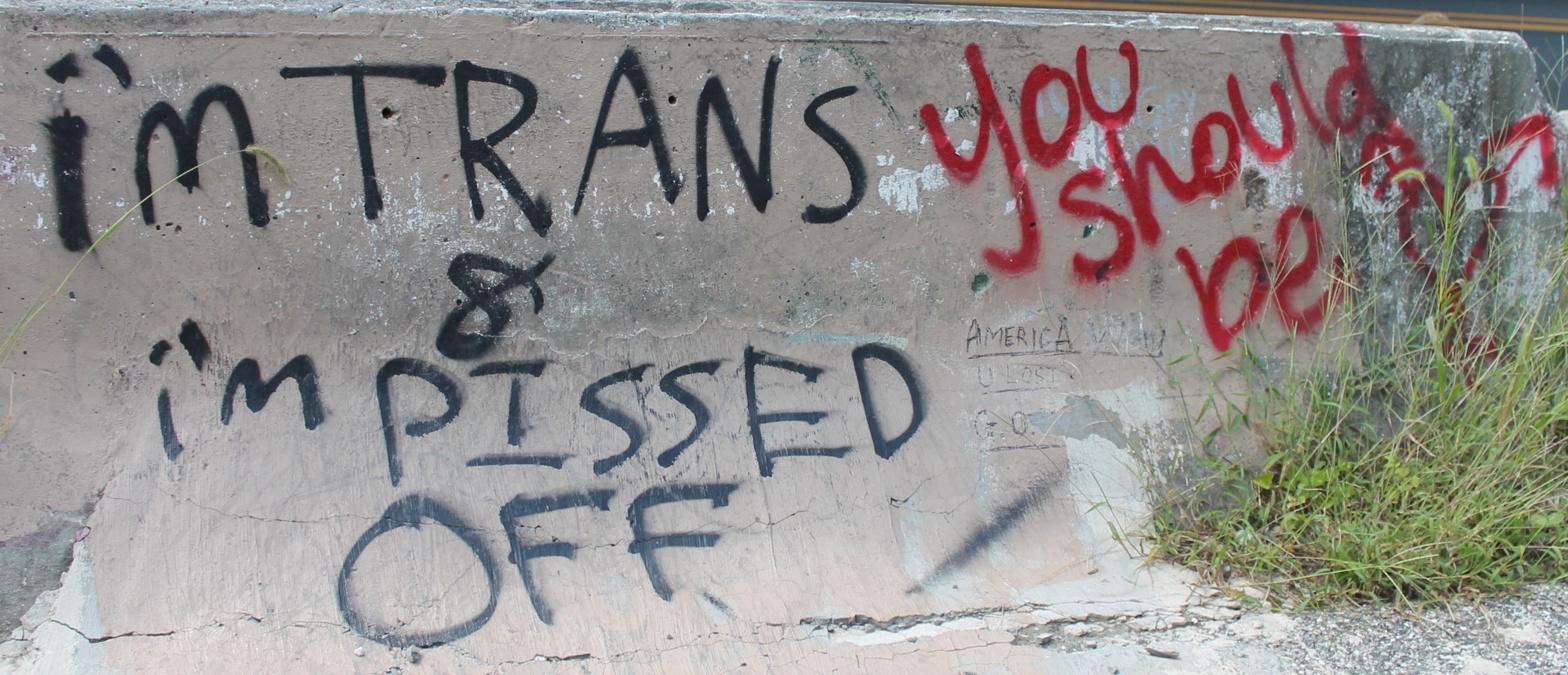
Graffiti left by trans individuals in Baltimore, Maryland, expressing disillusionment with society

Whether intentional or not, transphobia and cissexism have severe consequences for the target of the negative attitude. Transphobia creates significant stresses for transgender people which can lead them to feel shame, low self-esteem, alienation and inadequacy. Transgender youth often try to cope with the stress by running away from home, dropping out of school, using drugs or self-harming. Suicide rates among transgender people are thought to be especially high, because of how they are treated by their families and by society.

=== Childhood and adolescence ===
Polyvictimization is experiencing multiple forms of abuse and victimization throughout a person's life, such as physical or sexual violence, bullying/aggression, parental neglect or abuse, experiencing crime, etc. Polyvictimization can start in childhood and has consequences for adolescent health and thus adult health. Transgender, gender diverse, and sexual minority adolescents (TGSA) are more likely to experience polyvictimization when compared to their cisgender peers. Family traits more associated with polyvictimization in TGSA include: families that have higher than average levels of violence and adversity in their life, families that give their child higher than average levels of microaggressions and lower levels of microaffirmations, and families that have average levels of violence and adversity, and also give their child higher levels of microaffirmations. Posttraumatic stress disorder (PTSD) symptoms reported by TGSA has shown to be a significant link between TGSA grouped by their family experiences and polyvictimization.

Research supported by the National Institute of Mental Health (NIMH) assessed lesbian, gay, bisexual, and transgender (LGBT) adolescents and noted that those who had moderate to high, and steady or increasing rates of victimization or verbal or physical threats, were at heightened risk for developing PTSD. Relational and physical bullying victimization, as well as various other forms of emotional distress, are increasingly experienced by the transgender and gender diverse (TGD) adolescent population. Those who experience the most physical and relational bullying victimization and emotional distress, are AMAB youth whom others perceived as very, or mostly, feminine. Moreover, regardless of assigned gender at birth, relational bullying victimization, depression, and suicidal ideation is common among adolescents that can be perceived as anything other than very, or mostly, masculine.

Repeatedly, research on the effects of aggression and violence against TGD youth and young adults shows – when compared to their cisgender peers – higher rates of PTSD, depression, non-suicidal self-injury, suicidal ideation, intent, plan, and attempts, higher rates of substance use (cigarettes, alcohol, marijuana), trauma, skipping school due to safety concerns, and poorer health outcomes.

The 2015 United States Transgender Survey, the largest such survey ever carried out (with 27,715 respondents), found that one in ten respondents suffered transphobic violence at the hands of a family member and 8% were forced to leave their homes for being transgender. The majority of those who were openly transgender or perceived as transgender at school were victims of some form of mistreatment on account of this, including verbal abuse (54%), physical attacks (24%), and sexual assault (13%). 17% experienced such severe mistreatment that they had to leave school. Support from one's community or family was correlated with more positive outcomes related to mental health and social functioning.

=== Adulthood ===
In adulthood, the effects of aggression and violence against various groups of transgender people has also been documented in domains such as mental and physical health, and safety and discrimination in the military. Transgender related bias, or discrimination, victimization, and rejection, affects transgender adults and the severity of PTSD symptoms they report. A systematic review completed in 2018 examined 77 studies that reported mental health disparities and social stress felt by TGD adults. The analysis found associations between TGD identity and anxiety, depression, PTSD, substance use, and suicidality, as well as added social stress factors such as violence, discrimination, and exclusion. When examining posttraumatic stress disorder and substance use in transgender adult communities, records indicated that transgender adults who have PTSD are more likely to be diagnosed with a substance use disorder within their lifetime. A National Institute of Health (NIH) analysis conducted with data collected at a community health center in the United States compared transgender and cisgender adult patients on various possible health disparities. Their research showed that within their lifetime, transgender patients experienced more violence, childhood abuse, discrimination, and suicidal thoughts or suicide attempts when compared to their cisgender counterparts who had a similar age, education, ethnicity/race, and income.

=== United States military ===
Strong associations between military sexual assault (MSA) and PTSD have been documented in both men and women. A nationwide survey of military personnel in 2015 found that 17.2% of transgender veterans reported experiencing MSA. Links have been found between MSA experienced by transgender veterans and increased depression symptom severity, past-year drug use, and PTSD symptom severity.

Posttraumatic stress disorder has also been associated with suicidality and substance use among adults. For instance, records reflect that veterans who identify as transgender increasingly experience PTSD and suicide ideation, plans, and attempts. Further, transgender specific stigma experienced while in the military and PTSD have been associated with deaths by suicide.

This could be worsened by racial health disparities that exist within the United States Department of Veterans Affairs (VA) Healthcare System. Particularly, racial health disparities between non-Hispanic Black transgender veterans (BTV) and non-Hispanic White transgender veterans (WTV) have been acknowledged. Non-Hispanic Black transgender veterans are at increased odds of having an array of physical health issues/diseases, serious mental illnesses, alcohol use, tobacco use, homelessness, and previous incarceration when compared to the WTV. Non-Hispanic White transgender veterans had increased odds of depression, obesity, and hypercholesterolemia when compared to BTV. Previous incarceration plays a larger role in the PTSD and homelessness that transgender veterans may experience. Specifically, transgender veterans that have a history of previous incarceration are more likely to have PTSD or to experience homelessness when compared to previously incarcerated veterans who are not transgender.

=== Poverty and homelessness ===
Nearly one third of U.S. transgender people responding to the 2015 U.S. Transgender Survey lived in poverty, compared to 14% of the population. During the 12 months prior to the survey, 30% of employed transgender people were either fired or mistreated for being transgender, from verbal abuse to sexual violence. 30% had been homeless at some point in their life, and 12% had been homeless during the previous year. Family and community support were correlated with significantly lower rates of homelessness and poverty.

=== Violence and harassment ===
During the year prior to the 2015 U.S. survey, 46% of respondents had been verbally harassed and 9% had been physically attacked for being transgender. 10% had been sexually assaulted during the previous year, and 47% had been sexually assaulted at some point in their life.

Evidence collected by the Transgender Day of Remembrance and National Coalition of Anti-Violence Programs on the homicide rates of transgender individuals suggests that the homicide rates of young trans women who are Black or Latina are "almost certainly higher" than those of cisgender women of the same race.

==== In public restrooms ====
During the year prior to the 2015 U.S. survey, 12% of respondents reported being verbally harassed in a public restroom. 1% reported being sexually assaulted in a public restroom for being transgender, and 1% reported being otherwise physically assaulted for being transgender. 9% reported being denied the right to use a public restroom consistent with their gender.

=== Health ===
During the year prior to the 2015 U.S. survey, 59% of respondents reported avoiding using a public restroom out of fear of violence or harassment. 32% limited the amount they ate or drank in order to avoid using a public restroom. 8% reported suffering a urinary tract infection, kidney infection, or other kidney problem as a result of avoiding public restrooms.

33% reported having negative experiences with a healthcare professional related to being transgender, such as verbal harassment or denial of treatment. 23% reported that they did not seek treatment for a condition out of fear of being mistreated, while 33% did not seek treatment because they were unable to afford it.

During the month prior to the survey, 39% of American transgender people experienced major psychological distress, compared to 5% of the general population of the United States. 40% had attempted suicide at some point in their life, compared to 4.6 percent of the American population. Family and community support were correlated with far lower rates of suicide attempts and of major psychological distress.

A study conducted on transgender women of color in San Francisco has shown a higher correlation between transphobia and risk of transgender women engaging in HIV risk behavior. The study shows that the transgender youth face social discrimination, and they may not have a social role model. The young adults in this group have shown a higher risk of engaging in unprotected receptive anal intercourse when the exposure to transphobia is high. Therefore, as per the study shows a correlation between transphobia and high risk of HIV.

==== Mental health ====
People who are transgender are more likely to experience some type of psychological distress because of the harassment and discrimination that comes with transphobia. Student Affairs Administrators in Higher Education conducted a nationwide survey on college campuses examining the psychological effects on transgender people, with a sample size of 86. Out of these 86 participants, 54% stated they have attended psychological counseling before and 10% had been hospitalized for reasons related to mental health. The final results of the study show that over twice as many participants who considered themselves transgender (43%) had engaged in self-injurious behavior, versus those who considered themselves male or female (16%).

According to Virupaksha, Muralidhar, and Ramakrishna, suicide attempts among transgender people globally range from 32% to 50%. In India, 31% to 50% of transgender people have tried to commit suicide before age 20. 50% of transgender people in Australia and 45% of those in England have attempted suicide at least once. In the United States, suicide attempts reported by transgender and gender nonconforming adults exceed the rate of the general population: 41% versus 4.6 percent. In San Francisco alone, the suicide attempt rate among transgender people is 32% overall, and for those under age 25 it is 50%.

According to the study Transphobia Among Transgenders of Color by the University of California, San Francisco, transphobia affects the psychological vulnerability of transgender people of color as compared to those of other ethnicities. Acts of transphobia such as undue denial of services, unfair dismissal from work places or stigmatization have far-reaching effects on the subjects such as low self-esteem, under-performance, stress, withdrawal or even depression. When it comes to the minorities, who are already proven to be undergoing various forms of discrimination, the consequences are even more exaggerated. Transgender people of color are more significantly associated with depression than their white counterparts.

Information regarding the effects of transphobia with respect to minority identities has not been well documented. In a 2018 review of mental health research regarding transgender individuals, only 4 out of 77 studies that were reviewed examined the intersectionality of transgender and racial identities. There were other studies that included disproportionately high amounts of transgender individuals who are in multiple minority groups, but the authors note that it is difficult to tell if these studies generalize to the transgender/ gender nonconforming community as a whole due to lack of extensive study.

To help transgender people work through traumatic experiences, minority stress, and internalized transphobia, mental health practitioners have begun integrating the gender-affirmative model into cognitive behavioral therapy, person-centered therapy, and acceptance and commitment therapy.

==== Pregnancy issues ====
Many transgender people transition without undergoing surgery to remove reproductive organs or to reconstruct genitals, thus transition does not necessarily remove the ability or the desire to reproduce. While the same-sex issues surrounding the birth and parenting of children have gained a degree of acceptance, trans practices of parenting have received much less attention and acceptance. In 2007 a transgender man, Thomas Beatie, became pregnant because his wife was infertile. His pregnancy drew world-wide attention. He commented:

Doctors have discriminated against us, turning us away due to their religious beliefs. Health care professionals have refused to call me by a male pronoun or recognize Nancy as my wife. Receptionists have laughed at us. Friends and family have been unsupportive; most of Nancy's family doesn't even know I'm transgender.

== Countering prejudice ==
The contact hypothesis is the influential theory that contact between groups reduces prejudice. The findings from a 2009 study by Mark E. King, PhD and his colleagues supported that the contact can reduce prejudice towards transgender people, in a studied Hong Kong population. Walch et al. (2012) found a significant reduction in prejudice following viewership of a transgender speaker panel. In 2020, professor Jordan R. Axt and colleagues found an association between tested subjects' results in "a novel Implicit Association Test (IAT) assessing implicit attitudes toward transgender people", and their beliefs about transgender people, as well as their contact with transgender people. However, Cheso et al. (2024) suggested contact has a larger effect in reducing prejudice towards transgender people depending on certain factors, such as the level of knowledge about transgender people, and the level of contact quality.

Findings from Fitzgerald et al. (2023) suggested that intergroup contact with lesbian, gay, or bisexual people also had "secondary transfer effects" that reduced prejudice against transgender people.

A study published 2016 found that ten minute deep canvassing conversations could reduce transphobia, with "decreases greater than Americans' average decrease in homophobia from 1998 to 2012." The effect persisted in a follow-up survey three months later.

== Double standards and Hypocrisy ==
Transgender individuals are often judged harshly for seeking appropriate care that cisgender people also receive. Similarly, when a cisgender person wishes to change their name or appearance, it often goes unquestioned and is respected by institutions that challenge trans people's names and appearance. Many if not all forms of gender affirming care that constitute best practices for transgender people are also sometimes recommended for cisgender people. In the United States of America, there have been many attempts to ban hormone replacement therapy for transgender people while carving out exceptions for cisgender patients including women undergoing menopause, men with low testosterone, and people seeking appearance changes. Similar examples exist across other types of gender affirming care.

Some scholars including Drew Clark of the University of British Columbia point to the existence of a cisgender bias in medicine. Some trans people express that they have to do extensive research on medical issues to make up for their doctor's lack of knowledge, even about practices that have existed for hundreds of years.

== See also ==
- 2020s anti-LGBTQ movement in the United States
- Anti-transgender movement in the United Kingdom
- Anti-gender movement
- Parental rights movement
- Transgender health care misinformation
- Biological determinism
- Corrective rape
- GATE
- Hate crime
- LGBTQ people in prison
- List of people killed for being transgender
- Minority stress
- Outline of transgender topics
- Press for Change – UK law organisation for transgender people
- Transgender genocide
- Trans panic defense – a legal defense for assault or murder where the victim is trans.
- Transgender Day of Remembrance
- Transgender Europe
- Transgender inequality
- Transgender Law Center
- Transmisogyny
- Discrimination against nonbinary people
- Discrimination against transgender men
- Transphobia in the United States
