= Israel Luna =

Israel Luna may refer to:

- Israel Luna (filmmaker)
- Israel Luna (footballer)
