= Greg Neimeyer =

American academic

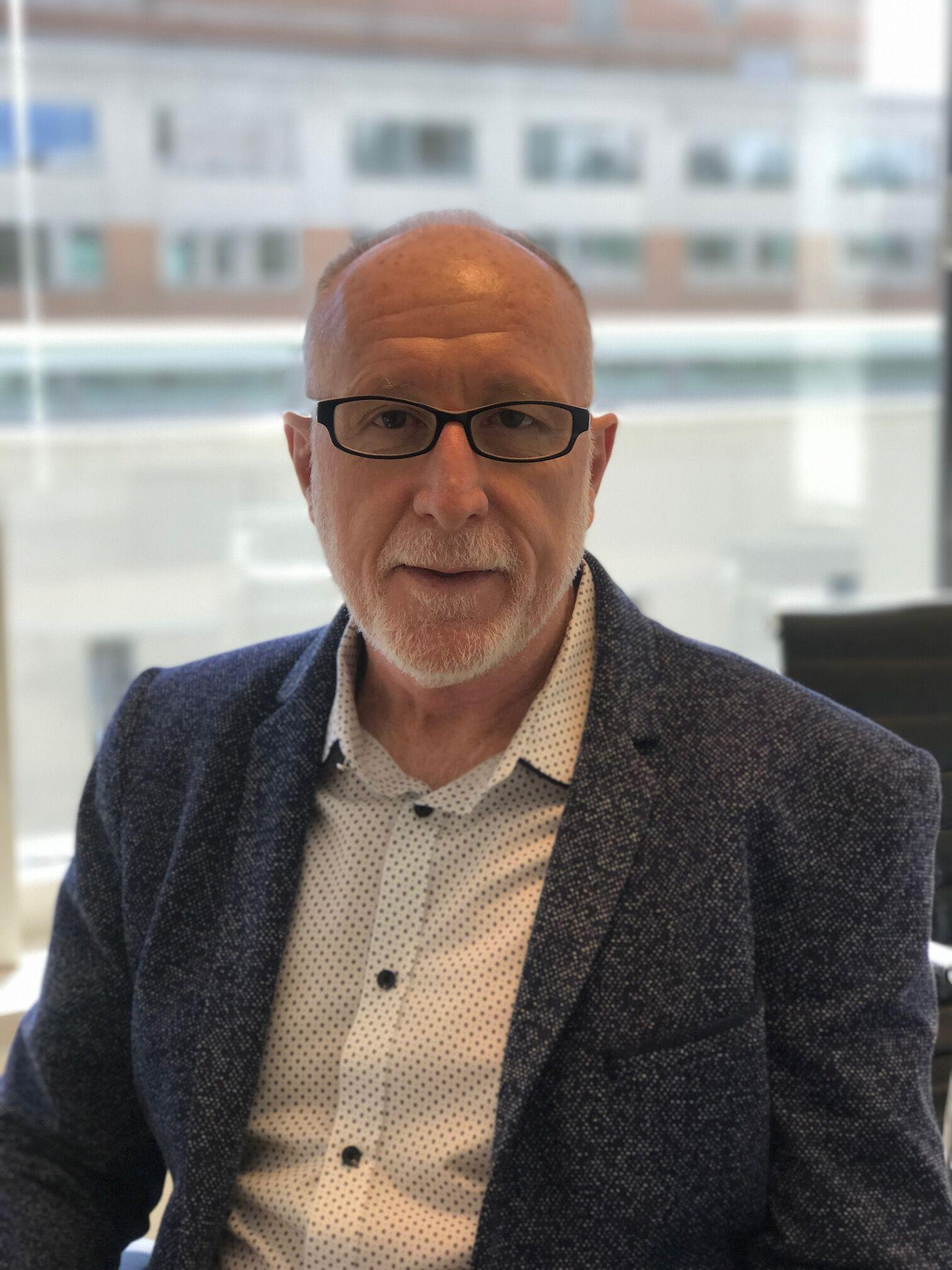
- Greg Neimeyer in September 2017

Gregory J. Neimeyer (/ˈniːmaɪ.ər/ NEE-my-ər) is a professor of psychology at the University of Florida. In 2009 he was appointed associate executive director for professional development and continuing education at the American Psychological Association. Previously, he was an adjunct psychology faculty member at the University of West Florida, during which time he was awarded the Adjunct Faculty Excellence Award in 2021.

He is a fellow of the Global Healthspan Policy Institute in Washington, D.C.

== Personal life ==
His brother Dr. Robert "Bob" A. Neimeyer is also a professor and scholar of psychology. In 2016 he married American lobbyist Edwina Rogers.

== Publications ==
As editor:

- Casebook of Constructivist Assessment. New York: Sage Publications, 1993

As co-editor with Robert A. Neimeyer:

- Personal Construct Therapy Casebook. New York: Springer, 1987
- Advances in Personal Construct Psychology, volume 1. Greenwich, Connecticut: JAI Press, 1990
- Advances in Personal Construct Psychology, volume 2, Greenwich: JAI Press, 1992
- Advances in Personal Construct Psychology, volume 3. Greenwich: JAI Press, 1995
- Advances in Personal Construct Psychology, volume 4. Greenwich: JAI Press, 1997
- Advances in Personal Construct Psychology, volume 5. New York: Praeger Publications, 2002

As guest editor:

- Personal Constructs in Career Counseling and Development, special issue of the Journal of Career Development 18 (3).
