= Edwina Rogers =

US congressional aide and lobbyist (born 1964)

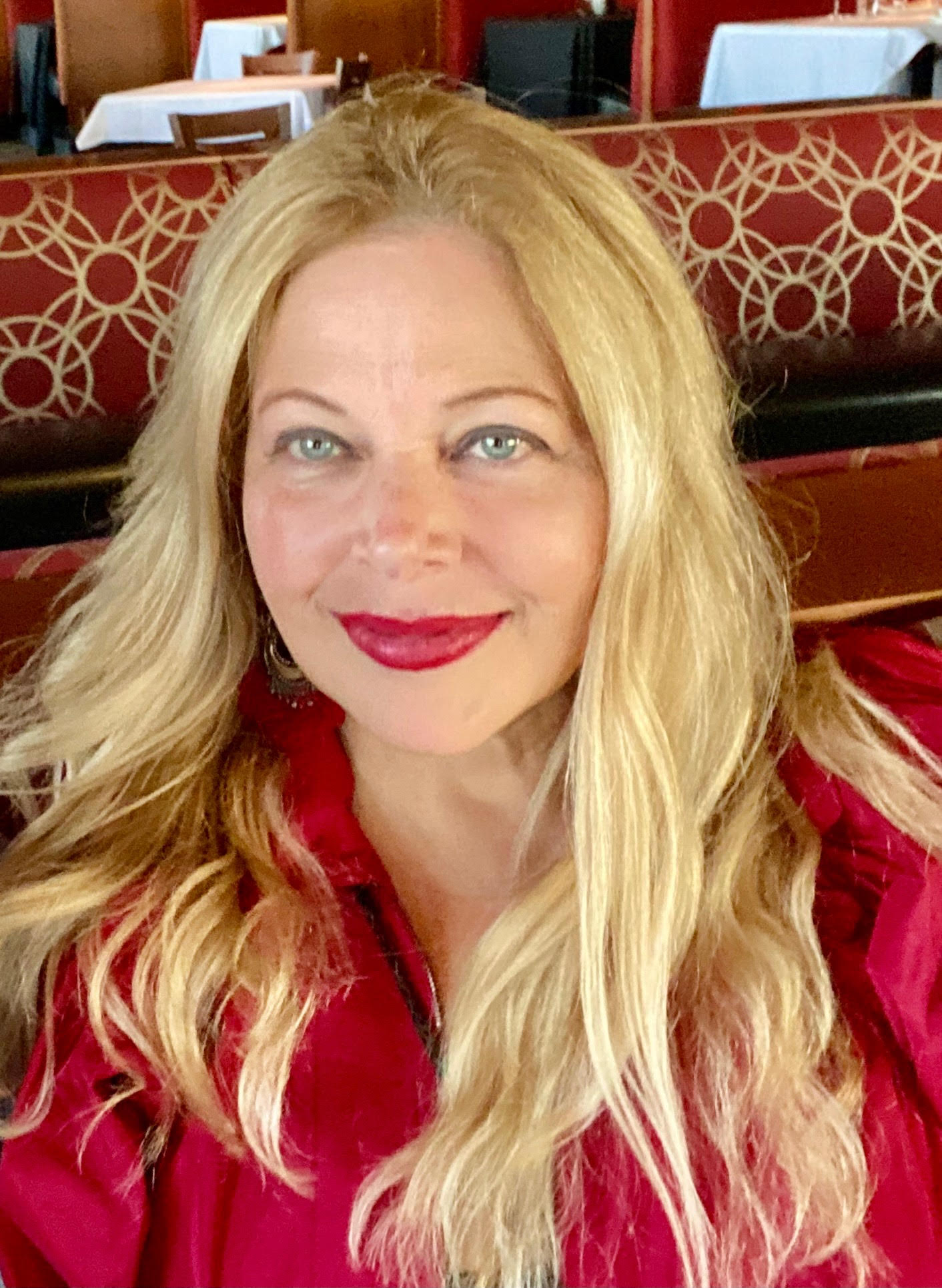
- Edwina Rogers in June 2020
- Born: Edwina Clifton Rogers; May 27, 1964 (age 62); Alabama
- Known for: Conservative lobbyist, Executive Director of the Patient Centered Primary Care Collaborative" and "White House, National Economic Council Associate Director

Edwina Clifton Rogers (born May 27, 1964) has served in public policy positions in the US Senate, White House, private, and international sectors for over twenty years. She has worked for two presidents and four senators, and founded or directed lobbying firms for public health issues. From 2012 to 2014, she was the executive director of the Secular Coalition for America. She is currently President of the Secular Policy Institute and CEO of the Global Healthspan Policy Institute, a 501c3 nonprofit think tank working to support research and development of new treatments to address the underlying causes of diseases of aging.

== Background and Education ==
Edwina Rogers grew up in rural Alabama when it was primarily a Southern Democratic state. She attended the University of Alabama on scholarship and received her BS in Corporate Finance, then went on to law school at The Catholic University of America (CUA), earning her J.D. while working several jobs. Rogers was a Fellow at the Kennedy School at Harvard during 1996.

In 1989, she married Ed Rogers, a protege of political strategist Lee Atwater who served in two administrations and founded a lobbying firm with former Mississippi governor Haley Barbour. The couple lived in an 18,000-square-foot mansion in McLean. The couple divorced in 2012. In 2016 she married American psychologist Greg Neimeyer.

== Career ==
=== White House ===
After graduation from law school, Rogers worked on International Trade matters for President George H. W. Bush at the Department of Commerce from 1989 to 1991. She practiced law in the Washington office of Balch and Bingham from 1991 until 1994, then served as General Counsel of the National Republican Senatorial Committee during the Republican take-over of the Senate in 1994. She worked for Senator Trent Lott while he was a Majority Leader in 1999.

She was an Economic Advisor for President George W. Bush at the White House during 2001 and 2002 at the National Economic Council, focusing on health and social security policy.

=== Senate ===
Rogers handled health policy for Senator Jeff Sessions in 2003 and 2004 before serving as Vice President of the Health Policy for the ERISA (Employee Retirement Income Security Act of 1974) Industry Committee (ERIC) in Washington, DC from May 2004 until January 2009. ERIC advocates the employee benefits and compensation interests of America’s major employers.

She served as the founding executive director of the Patient-Centered Primary Care Collaborative from 2006-2011, a Washington DC trade association, responsible for the national Patient Centered Medical Home movement and implementing the model around the US. She was a supporter of The Patient Protection and Affordable Care Act (PPACA), commonly called the Affordable Care Act (ACA) or, colloquially, Obamacare.

=== Secular Coalition for America ===
Rogers signed on as executive director of the Secular Coalition for America . The Secular Coalition represents 11 member organizations and their members on Capitol Hill. Rogers’ selection came on the heels of the March 2012 Reason Rally, a Secular Coalition for America sponsored event that drew tens of thousands of atheists, agnostics, humanists and other non-theistic Americans to Washington, D.C.

The Secular Coalition for America emphasizes separation of church and state, and champions issues with which the Republican Party typically comes into conflict. The people on its staff and in its member organizations typically support gay marriage, think contraception should be more broadly available, and work against school vouchers that use public funds to support "religious indoctrination." As a former Republican staffer, Rogers faced a great deal of scrutiny from the non-religious community when she joined the SCA.

In answer to her skeptical critics, Rogers describes herself as "nontheist" and as a libertarian-leaning economic conservative who is also "laissez-faire on social issues". According to Rogers, being a professional lobbyist and political staffer meant going along with certain causes even when she didn't believe in them. In 2007, when Rogers was vice president of health policy for the ERISA Industry Committee, Rogers testified in the House against a bill mandating more generous mental-health coverage, even though she personally favored the legislation. And she handled health-policy issues for pro-life senator Jeff Sessions despite being pro-choice herself. Rogers states she has donated to Planned Parenthood over the past 25 years.

On June 6, 2014, the Secular Coalition for America announced that Rogers has moved on from her role.

== Media appearances ==
Rogers has been a regular contributor of conservative newspaper columns, health and policy journals. She has written a conservative column for The Georgetowner newspaper in Washington, DC and is a regular strategist on cable news television. Rogers appeared as a commentator twice a week on Fox News and more than once a day on MSNBC.

Rogers made a guest appearance on The Real Housewives of D.C. in 2010 and in 2008 she demonstrated for another television crew her signature gift-giving style, which involved cutting up sheets of dollar bills and using them as wrapping paper. She says she started doing this years ago, as a "cheap" and "unique" way of wrapping inexpensive gifts while still complying with ethics rules governing gift-giving in Washington.

== Other work ==
She was a lobbyist for South Korea in the Middle East. She also served on the Board of Directors of Semco Energy, Inc. (NYSE: SEN) a natural gas distribution company until 2007.
