= Ticked-Off Trannies with Knives =

- Theatrical release poster
- Directed by: Israel Luna
- Written by: Israel Luna
- Produced by: Whitney Blake; Toni Miller
- Starring: Erica Andrews; Willam Belli; Kelexis Davenport; Jenna Skyy; Krystal Summers
- Cinematography: Jamie Moreno
- Edited by: Israel Luna
- Production company: La Luna Entertainment
- Distributed by: Breaking Glass Pictures
- Release dates: April 23, 2010 (Tribeca Film Festival); October 1, 2010 (United States (limited))
- Running time: 91 minutes
- Country: United States
- Language: English
- Budget: $50,000

Ticked-Off Trannies with Knives is a 2010 American rape and revenge exploitation film written and directed by Israel Luna. The film follows a trio of trans women who exact revenge on the men who brutally assault them and murder two of their friends. The film is split into five chapters, one of which is a missing reel.

The film engendered controversy when it was programmed at the 2010 Tribeca Film Festival. The Gay & Lesbian Alliance Against Defamation (GLAAD) condemned the film for what it called a negative portrayal of transgender people.

== Plot ==
After performing at a local club, trans women Rachel Slurr and Emma Grashun plan to party with Nacho and Chuey. When the guys tell them that they have a third friend, the girls convince their reluctant friend Bubbles Cliquot to join them. The girls drive to a warehouse where they are joined by Nacho and Chuey, along with their partner Boner. Bubbles tells her friends that Boner had recently drugged and raped her during a hook-up when he discovered she was a pre-op woman. Vowing to "finish the job", Boner, Nacho and Chuey attack the girls. Emma and Rachel are severely wounded but Bubbles is able to call her "mother" Pinky La'Trimm and Tipper Sommore and escape. Pinky and Tipper find Bubbles outside the warehouse and head inside to rescue Rachel and Emma. Instead, they are overpowered by the men and Boner attacks Bubbles again outside.

Some time later, Bubbles awakens from a coma. She learns from Pinky and Rachel that Emma and Tipper are dead. After Bubbles is discharged from the hospital, her friend Fergus trains the three surviving women in martial arts.

Back at Bubbles' apartment, Boner, Nacho and Chuey break in and overpower her again, tying her to a chair. Boner offers Bubbles a choice of ways to die but he momentarily turns his back on her. When he turns back Nacho and Chuey are unconscious and Bubbles, freed, knocks him out. A flashback reveals that Bubbles, Pinky, and Rachel set a trap for the men.

Boner regains consciousness to learn that the women have placed switchblade knives in the rectal cavities of Nacho and Chuey and a gun in his own rectum, weapons that will be triggered if any of them make any sudden moves. In a series of convoluted action sequences, Nacho and Chuey each recovers his knife and battles one of the women. Pinky kills Chuey and Rachel battles Nacho until Boner recovers his gun and holds it on Bubbles. Bubbles wrestles him for the weapon and, as Rachel finishes off Nacho, Bubbles shoots Boner in the chest. Pinky and Rachel each impale Boner with their thrown knives and Bubbles wrenches a large knife out of Nacho's skull and splits Boner's head with it, finally killing him.

== Cast ==
- Krystal Summers as Bubbles Cliquot
- Kelexis Davenport as Pinky La'Trimm
- Willam Belli as Rachel Slurr
- Erica Andrews as Emma Grashun
- Jenna Skyy as Tipper Sommore
- Tom Zembrod as Boner
- Richard D. Curtin as Fergus
- Kenny Ochoa as Nacho
- Gerardo Davila as Chuey
- Todd Jenkins as Doctor Phil Laccio
- Chase Wade as Nurse Connie Lingus
- Molly Spencer as La'Trice
- Melissa Timmerman as Marcy
- Souk Burrows as Flash
- Curt Wheeler as Squirt

== Production ==
=== Inspiration ===
Luna was inspired by the exploitation film genre, in particular the 1978 film I Spit on Your Grave and the Linda Blair vehicle Savage Streets. The idea for his self-described "transploitation" film came while he and a group of friends were watching Robert Rodriguez and Quentin Tarantino's Grindhouse. "After, we were just playing around and someone said I should do this with drag queens. That would be so much fun. I thought, 'Well, let me try to think of how we could do this with absolutely no budget whatsoever.' I thought a simple, old-fashioned revenge movie would be easy to write for me. And that’s what I did."

Luna did not want to tell the story of a male gay bashing victim because he believed that such stories have been told often already. "I wanted to do something more modern and I thought 'Whose story do you never see on the news these days?' It's not gay men—it's transgenders."

=== Filming ===
The film was shot in Dallas, Texas, in the summer of 2009, on an 18-day shooting schedule. The finished film is artificially worn with scratches and other indicators of age and at some points a jump in the action is covered with an intertitle indicating that a reel of the film is missing.

== Release ==
Ticked-Off Trannies with Knives premiered at the Tribeca Film Festival on April 23, 2010. The film had a limited theatrical release in October and Region 1 DVD-release on November 2, 2010.

== Reception ==
Writing for Variety, John Anderson compared Ticked-Off Trannies to the works of Roger Corman, Quentin Tarantino, and Robert Rodriguez. Finding that the film has a "transgressive edginess", Anderson noted the "catch-22" that Luna created for himself in balancing its championing of transgender people with its exploitation of their "inherently funny" nature. He called the film's production values "deliberately and appropriately horrible", which he said Luna uses as a way to escape any plot difficulties within the film by jumping ahead in the story with the claim of a "missing reel" of the film. Anderson concludes that Luna is for the most part successful in creating solid characters but that the film descends into the realm of cartoon violence.

Neil Genzlinger for The New York Times expressed embarrassment at the idea of even having to review a film called Ticked-Off Trannies with Knives before finding the film to be inept. "The only amusement comes in the catty remarks occasionally exchanged by the girls."

Gary Goldstein of the Los Angeles Times dismissed the film as "a joyless grind". Conversely, Frank Scheck for Reuters found the film "more than lives up to its title", although it would "probably [be] best appreciated at a midnight showing".

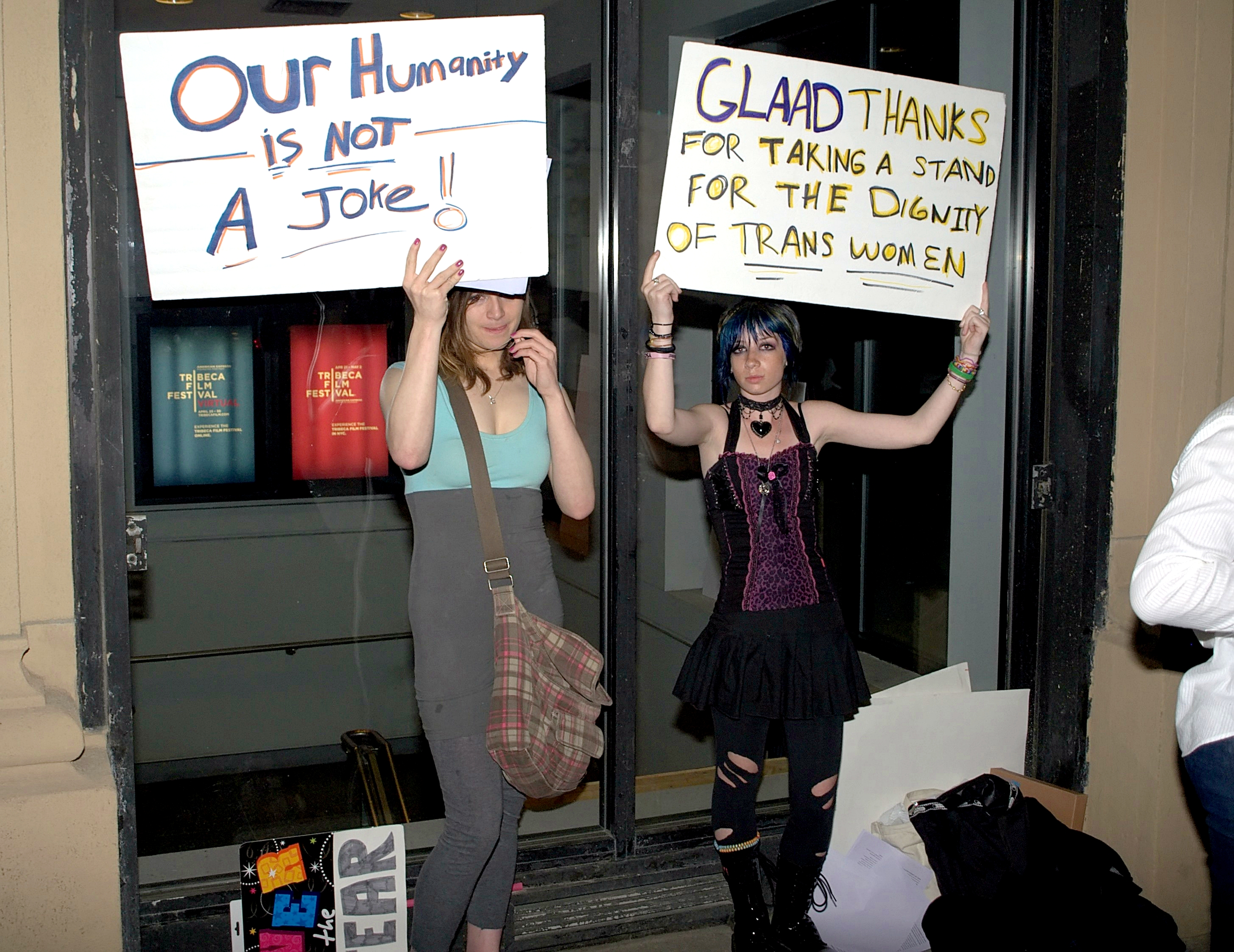
Demonstrators protest the film at the 2010 Tribeca Film Festival

The Tribeca Film Festival scheduled Ticked-Off Trannies to debut at its 2010 festival. This drew a complaint from the Gay & Lesbian Alliance Against Defamation (GLAAD), which stated that the film "misrepresent[s] the lives of transgender women and use[s] grotesque, exploitative depictions of violence against transgender women in ways that make light of the horrific brutality they all too often face". GLAAD claimed that the film conflated transgender identity with drag, which would create the impression in viewers unfamiliar with trans issues that "transgender women are ridiculous caricatures of 'real women'". GLAAD also criticized the filmmakers for referencing the real-life murders of trans woman Angie Zapata and gay teenager Jorge Mercado in the original trailer, which GLAAD believed reduced their murders to the level of the "outlandish violence" of the film.

Tribeca issued a response to GLAAD's concerns, noting that GLAAD had been provided with a copy of the film well in advance of the festival and that the organization had offered media advice to the producers, director Luna and members of the cast.

Writer and director Luna was puzzled by the negative reaction. He noted that the film's theme was one of empowerment, not victimhood. Luna said that he checked with many members of the Dallas transgender community, including those who worked on the film, regarding the use of the word "trannies" in the title and they had no issue with it, although he acknowledged that others within the community did object to it. He did, however, decide to re-cut the trailer to remove references to murder victims Zapata and Mercado.

Lead actress Krystal Summers responded to the controversy, saying, "Our film does not promote hate or violence against transgender women. It is not a documentary, but a work of fiction and a revenge fantasy." She asked the viewing public to judge the film on its own merits and not on the basis of GLAAD's opinion.
