= Israel Luna (filmmaker) =

American filmmaker

Israel Luna is an American filmmaker, best known for his movies Ticked-Off Trannies with Knives, Kicking Zombie Ass for Jesus, and Fright Flick.

== Early life ==
Luna first became interested in film at the age of five while watching a movie at a dual-screen drive-in theater near his hometown. During the family outing, he was supposed to be watching Superman, but was "glued to the next screen over" which was playing The Exorcist. He was fascinated at how images on a screen could make people scared, laugh or cry. He dreamed of making movies ever since.

== Career ==
In 2000 he co-founded La Luna Entertainment with his business partner John Maguire in Dallas, Texas. He has since written and directed several feature-length movies and has been involved with many other made-for-TV, stage and internet projects. His movie Fright Flick played at numerous venues on the 2008/2009 festival circuit in the United States and made its international screening debut in Amsterdam. The 2010 film Ticked-Off Trannies with Knives has been his biggest success to date, although it was denounced as "grotesque" and "exploitive" by the Gay and Lesbian Alliance Against Defamation (GLAAD).

La Luna announced plans to film another low-budget comedy intended to act as a companion piece to La Luna's film Ticked-Off Trannies with Knives to be titled Kicking Zombie Ass for Jesus. Willam Belli, Krystal Summers, and Richard D. Curtin were announced as slated to star in this zombie apocalypse spoof in which the only survivors were gay people and church people. The film was intended to begin shooting in late 2012, and La Luna began a crowdfunding campaign through Kicktraq, but failed to meet his intended goal. According to Belli, the film begins shooting in October 2013.

== Recognition ==
Recognition of his projects includes:

- Winner, Young Filmmakers Award at the Austin Film Festival, for his work on REEL KiDS
- Audience Award for Best Feature, for The Deadbeat Club at Dallas' Deep Ellum Film Festival
- A nomination for Best Feature for R U Invited? at Dallas' OUT TAKES Film Festival
- "Most Memorable of the Fest", for Fright Flick at the B-Movie Film Festival in Syracuse, New York

== Filmography ==
- Not It! (2002)
- Is Anybody There? (2002)
- Almost Time (2002)
- The Deadbeat Club (2004)
- I Know Who You Are (2005)
- R U Invited? (2006)
- Drop Me Off (2010)
- Ticked-Off Trannies with Knives (2010)
- Reunited (2011)
- Fright Flick (2011)
- The Ouija Experiment (2011), a remake of Is Anybody There?
- The Ouija Experiment 2 (2014)
- Dead Don't Die in Dallas (2019)
