= Journal of Career Development =

- Discipline: Psychology
- Language: English
- Edited by: Lisa Y. Flores

Publication details
- Former name: Journal of Career Education
- History: 1972-present
- Publisher: SAGE Publications
- Frequency: Bimonthly
- Impact factor: 1.473 (2017)

Standard abbreviations
- ISO 4: J. Career Dev.

Indexing
- ISSN: 0894-8453 (print); 1556-0856 (web)
- LCCN: 85644338
- OCLC no.: 11297198

Links
- Journal homepage; Online access; Online archive

Journal of Career Development is a peer-reviewed academic journal that publishes papers in the field of Psychology. The journal's editor is Lisa Y. Flores (University of Missouri). It has been in publication since 1972 and is currently published by SAGE Publications in association with Curators of the University of Missouri.

== Abstracting and indexing ==
Journal of Career Development is abstracted and indexed in, among other databases: SCOPUS, and the Social Sciences Citation Index. According to the Journal Citation Reports, its 2017 impact factor is 1.473, ranking it 47 out of 82 journals in the category ‘Psychology, Applied’.
