= Riley Gaines =

American conservative activist and former swimmer

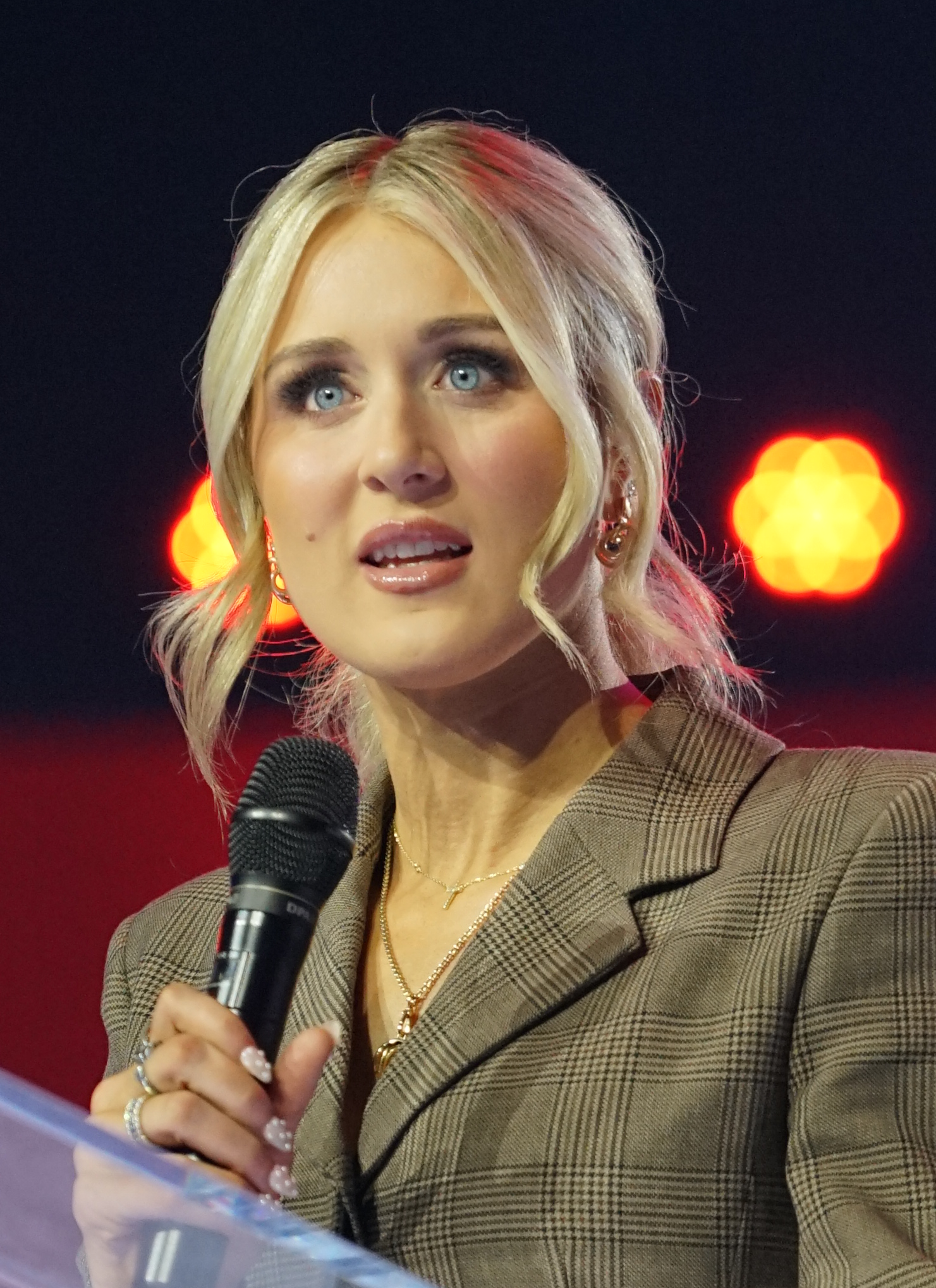
- Gaines at AmericaFest 2025

Personal information
- Born: Riley Marie Gaines; April 21, 2000 (age 26) Nashville, Tennessee, U.S.
- Education: University of Kentucky (BS)
- Spouse: Louis Barker (m. 2022)
- Children: 1
- Website: rileygaines.com

Sport
- Sport: Swimming
- Strokes: Butterfly, freestyle
- College team: University of Kentucky
Medal record
Women's swimming
NCAA Championships
Silver medal – second place	2021 Greensboro	4x200 y freestyle relay
SEC Championships
Gold medal – first place	2022 Knoxville	200 y butterfly
Gold medal – first place	2021 Columbia	800 y freestyle
Silver medal – second place	2020 Auburn	800 y freestyle
Bronze medal – third place	2019 Athens	800 y freestyle

Riley Marie Gaines Barker (née Gaines; born April 21, 2000) is an American conservative political activist, podcast host, and former collegiate swimmer known for campaigning against the participation of trans women in women's sports and against public acceptance of transgender people more widely. A twelve-time NCAA All-American, she competed for the University of Kentucky's Kentucky Wildcats swim team in the Southeastern Conference before graduating and focusing on anti-trans activism. In July 2023, Gaines launched the OutKick podcast Gaines for Girls, which was rebranded as The Riley Gaines Show in January 2026 to expand into general cultural and political commentary.

== Early life ==
Gaines was born and raised in Nashville, Tennessee. Her parents were active in sports. Her father, Brad Gaines, played football at Vanderbilt University and her mother, Telisha Gaines, played softball at Donelson Christian Academy and Austin Peay State University. Gaines attended Station Camp High School in Gallatin, Tennessee. As a junior, she won the 100-yard butterfly and 100-yard freestyle in the TISCA High School Swim & Dive Championship in Knoxville in 2017. She was invited to a 2016 United States Olympic Trials event, but failed to qualify after placing 85th.

== College athletics ==
Gaines joined the University of Kentucky's swim team and made the All-SEC Freshman Team in 2019. She also made the All-SEC Second Team in 2019 and 2020. She participated in the 2021 NCAA Women's Swimming & Diving Championships, coming seventh in the 200 freestyle race and winning a silver medal in the 4 × 200 yd freestyle relay; she made the All-SEC First Team that year. She was the 2022 SEC Women's Swimming and Diving Scholar-Athlete of the Year.

Gaines's highest-ranking individual event finish nationally was 5th place in the NCAA WD1 Championship 200yds Freestyle Final in March 2022. She did not pursue a professional career after graduating from college in 2022.

In March 2022, while swimming for the University of Kentucky in the 200-yard freestyle at the NCAA championship (her final competitive event race), Gaines tied for fifth place with University of Pennsylvania swimmer Lia Thomas, who subsequently became the first openly trans woman champion in the NCAA women's division after winning the 500-yard freestyle later at the same meet. While Thomas held the fifth-place trophy after the finish, Gaines held an equally-sized sixth-place trophy while waiting for another fifth-place trophy in the mail. Immediately after the meet, Gaines said in an interview with The Daily Wire: "I am in full support of her and full support of her transition and her swimming career...because there's no doubt that she works hard too, but she's just abiding by the rules that the NCAA put in place, and that's the issue." Five days after her race against Thomas, an article about the race was published in The Daily Wire. Gaines went on to appear on a number of conservative podcasts and television programs, including shows hosted by Marsha Blackburn and Tucker Carlson. She was a speaker at the Conservative Political Action Conference in 2022, where she was introduced by Donald Trump.

In 2023, Gaines said that Thomas shared locker room space with her while still possessing "male genitalia". Her characterization has been disputed, with other teammates saying that Thomas changed "facing a corner, wrapped in a towel". Gaines states that this incident prompted her activism. She has been criticized by former teammates for focusing on transgender women in sports instead of the conduct of their coach Lars Jorgensen.

== Activism and politics ==
=== 2022–2023 ===
Gaines has advocated against the inclusion of transgender women in the women's division of sports.

In September 2022, Gaines supported the campaign of Republican US Senator Rand Paul by appearing in a TV ad for him, where she shared her criticism of trans women in women's sports.

By January 2023, Gaines had participated in a small protest at the NCAA Convention, appeared in campaign advertisements for former US Senate candidate for the Republican Party, Herschel Walker, and spoken at a Donald Trump rally.

In March 2023, Gaines was an invited speaker at a Texas Senate committee in support of legislation that would categorically prohibit transgender college athletes from competing in sports divisions that align with their gender identity.

In April 2023, Gaines visited San Francisco State University for the student chapter event of the conservative political organization Turning Point USA and spoke publicly about her campaign against transgender athletes in women's sports, which she referred to as spiritual warfare. After the event concluded, protesters arrived. Gaines was escorted by law enforcement officers to shelter in a classroom, where she stayed for three hours while protesters continued to demonstrate outside.

On June 2, 2023, Gaines endorsed Republican Ron DeSantis in the 2024 US presidential election.

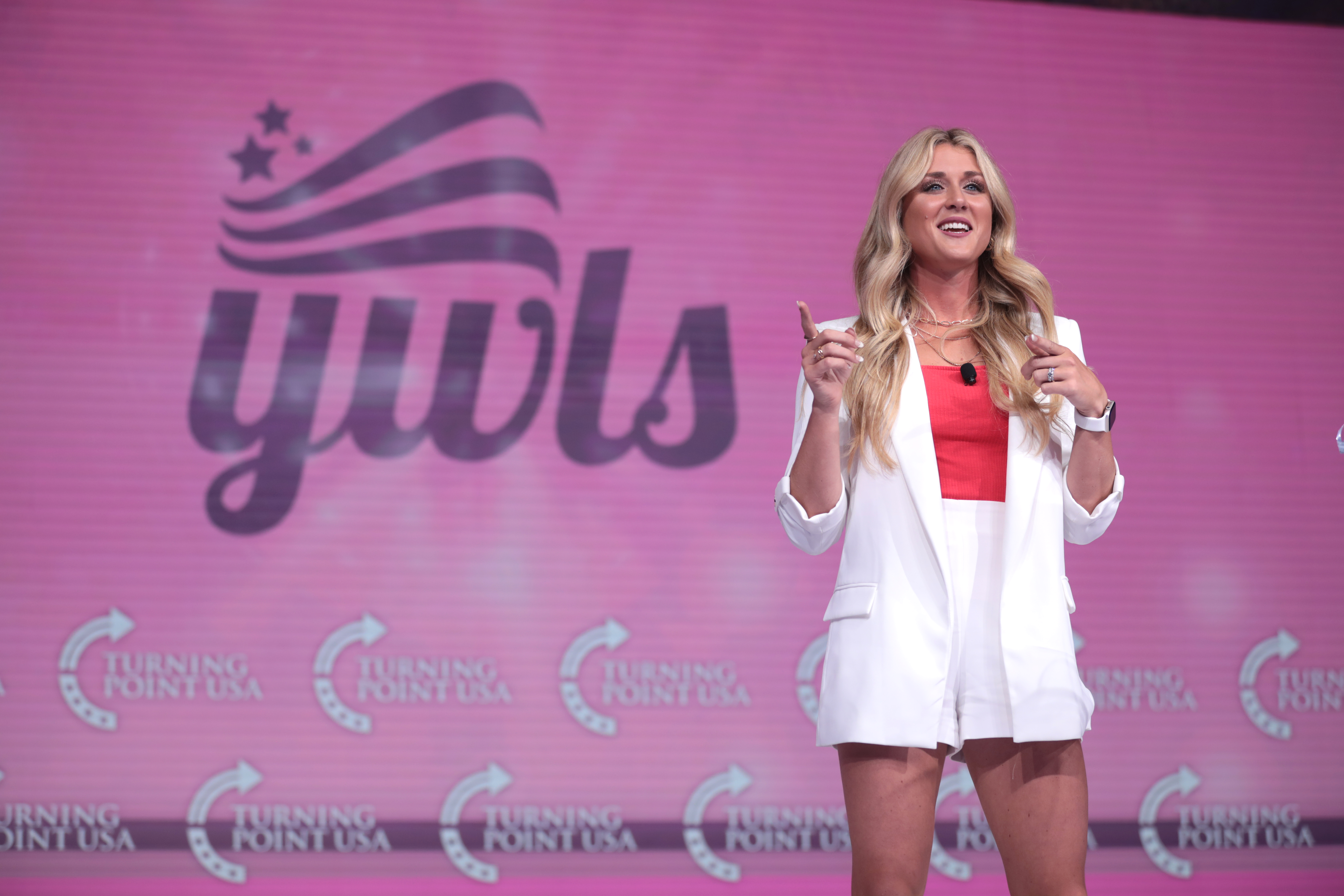
Gaines speaking at the 2023 Young Women's Leadership Conference

On June 21, 2023, Gaines appeared as a witness at a Senate Judiciary Committee hearing focused on safeguarding civil rights for LGBTQ Americans and according to C-SPAN, shared her "own personal experience competing with trans swimmer Lia Thomas and having to share the same dressing room."

Gaines accompanied Oklahoma Governor Kevin Stitt as he signed an executive order in August 2023 representing Independent Women's Voice (IWV) which had developed model legislation the Oklahoma bill was based on. The executive order includes a variety of provisions, including a prohibition on transgender women and girls using bathrooms and locker rooms designated for women, a direction to state agencies to use sex assigned at birth to define male and female, as well as definitions for terms such as "man" and "woman."

In November 2023, Gaines confirmed working with FIDE to prevent transgender women from playing in women's chess. This prompted criticism from PinkNews for claiming that trans women had an advantage at chess. That month she also testified to the Ohio Senate Government Oversight Committee about her experiences competing with Thomas and on preventing trans women from competing in female sports in Ohio. The House would go on to pass Bill 68 that would "prevent trans athletes from participating in Ohio women's sports and would block doctors from providing gender-affirming care to trans youth."

=== 2024–present ===
In March 2024, Gaines was one of sixteen female student athletes who launched a legal case against the National Collegiate Athletic Association (NCAA) over the participation of transgender athletes in women's sports.

Gaines spoke at the annual Republican Lincoln Day Dinner in May 2024.

After the attempted assassination of Donald Trump in Pennsylvania, Gaines expressed her support for Trump's candidacy. In July 2024, Gaines spoke at the Republican National Convention in support of Trump.

In August 2024, Gaines announced the launch of the Riley Gaines Center at the Leadership Institute in Arlington, Virginia.

On November 18, 2024, Gaines tweeted that she had voted for Trump.

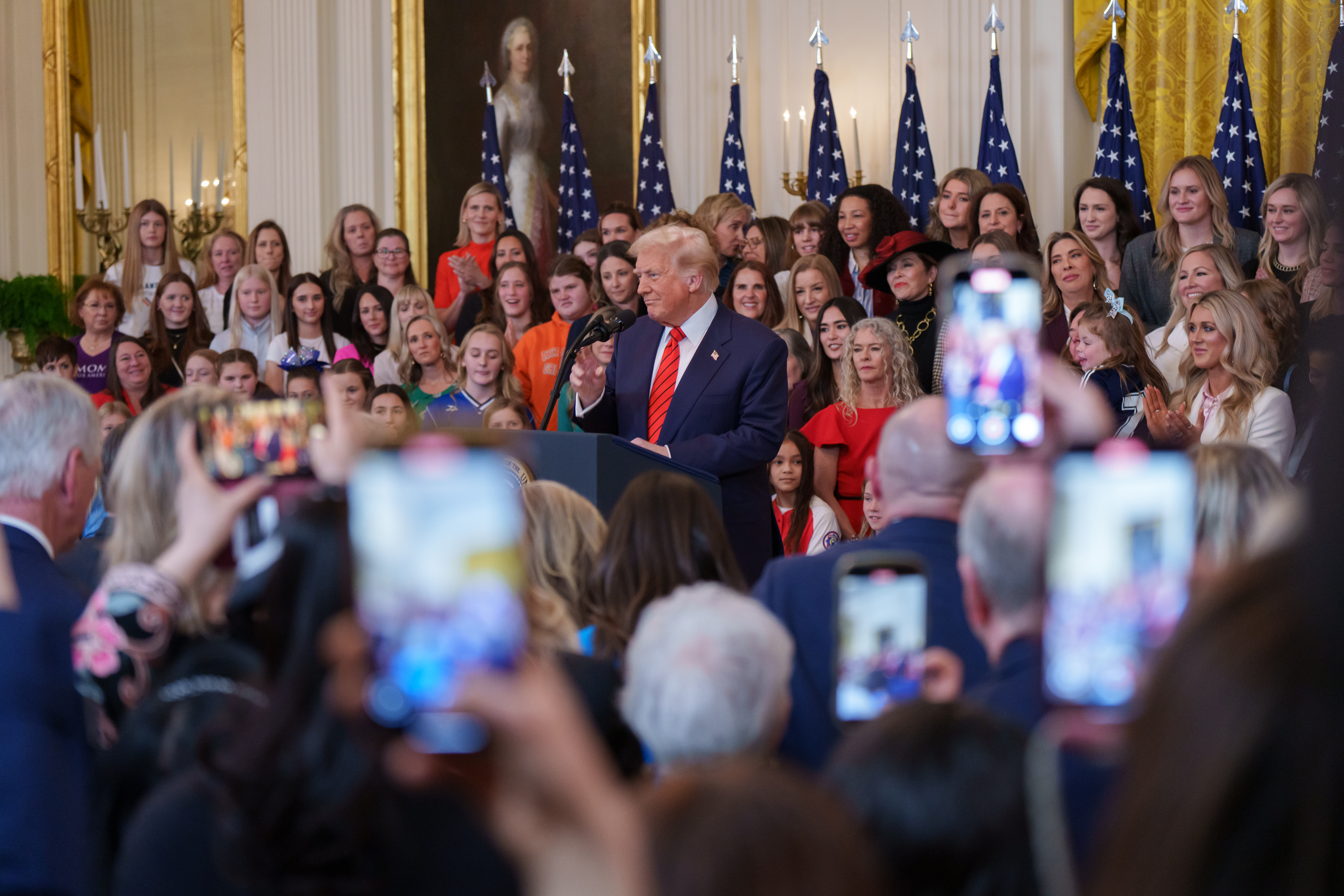
Gaines (far right of the picture) at a Trump speech at the White House in February 2025

In February 2025, the United States Department of Health and Human Services (HHS) launched a webpage on women's health that included videos featuring Gaines discussing her involvement with Executive Order 14201, which conditions federal funding on compliance with policies restricting participation of transgender girls in girls' sports programs.

Several outlets have noted that Gaines's activism often includes publicly targeting and insulting transgender individuals, including high school and middle school athletes, on social media to her 1.6 million followers. In June 2025, gymnast Simone Biles responded to one of these instances on X, calling Gaines "truly sick" and a "straight up sore loser" due to her advocacy against the participation of trans women in women's sports. Biles wrote that Gaines should "bully someone your own size, which would ironically be a male." Gaines replied that she found Biles's comments "so disappointing" and accused her of body shaming. Biles later posted an apology, saying that she should not have gotten "personal" with Gaines, and that she believes the current sports system does not adequately balance competitive equity with inclusion.

Gaines's wider position has been expressed several times as being that sports is a gateway to invalidating the wider womanhood and public acceptance of transgender women, with Gaines quoted as saying "The gender ideology movement is a house of cards, and I believe it's lying on that sports issue (...) This will be the card that makes all of it crumble."

In a January 2026 video on Instagram, Gaines praised the actions of ICE agents in detaining the five-year old Liam Conejo Ramos. Gaines warned her followers, "Do not let compassion, or what you believe to be compassion, cloud you or suspend you from thinking critically." In June 2026, Gaines was the signatory of a petition to criminalize abortion from the moment of fertilization.

== Personal life ==
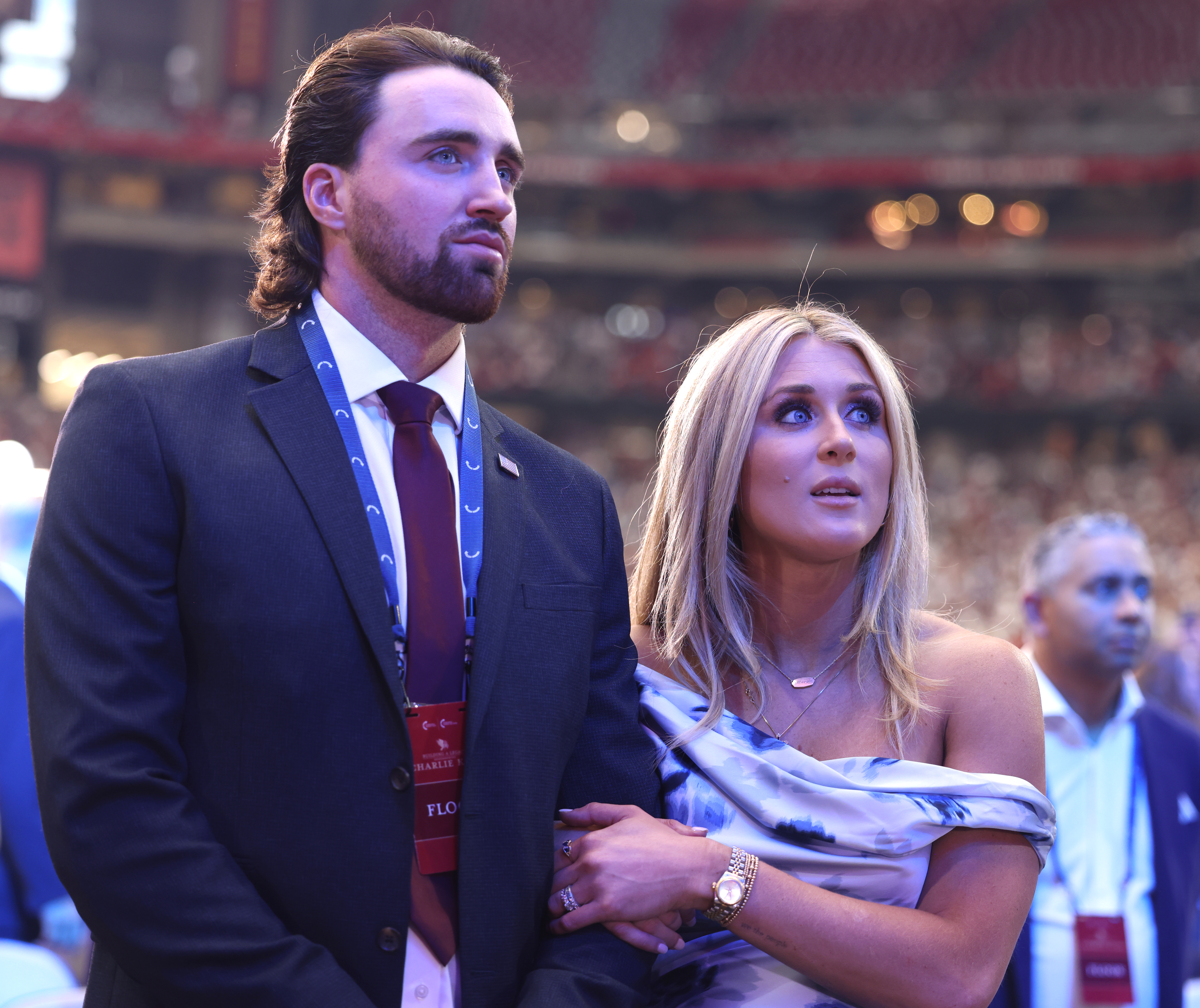
Louis Barker, Gaines at Charlie Kirk memorial service in 2025

Gaines is a Christian and has stated that her faith has shaped her activism. She graduated from the University of Kentucky in 2022 with a BSc in health sciences. Her original plan was to become a dentist.

In 2022, Gaines married University of Kentucky swimmer Louis Barker after dating for three years.

In June 2025, Gaines and Barker announced that they were expecting their first child. Their daughter was born in October 2025.

As of October 2025, Barker, a British citizen, struggled to get his green card or citizenship because of his refusal to take the COVID vaccine; Riley publicly criticized these administrative hurdles.

== Awards ==
Gaines has been presented with:

- 2022 Southeastern Conference Women's Swimming and Diving Scholar-Athlete of the Year
- 2022 Algernon Sydney Sullivan Award
