= Andraya Yearwood =

American track and field athlete(born 2001)

- Born: August 15, 2001 (age 25); Atlanta, Georgia, U.S.
- Education: North Carolina Central University (BA); Columbia University (MA)
- Occupation: Scholar-Activist
- Years active: 2017–present
- Known for: Transgender rights activism
- Television: Good Morning America (2018), The Don Lemon Show (2022), CNN+ (2022), VICE (2020, 2022, 2023)
- Political party: Democratic
- Awards: New York Athlete Ally Action Award (2019), Connecticut Sports Writers’ Alliance Bob Casey Courage Award (2019), Teen Vogue 21 Under 21: The Girls and Femmes Building a Better Future Award (2020), LGBTQ Nation Hero of the Year Award [nominee] (2021),TransPonder Empowering Trans Voice Award (2024), North Carolina Central University Outstanding Graduating Senior Award (2024), Middlebury College Premio a la Estudiante Más Representativa del Nivel 4 (2024), Triangle Community Center/Connecticut Pride Center Advocacy in Action Award (2026)
- Honours: WorldStrides Impact Scholarship (2019), Point Foundation BIPOC Scholarship (2024), Foreign Language and Area Studies Fellowship (2024-2025), Fort Lewis College Reconciliation and Educating Character Fellowship (2026-2027)
- Sports career
- Country: United States
- Sport: Track and field
- Events: 55 m, 60 m, 100 m, 200 m
- Coached by: Brian Calhoun, Thomas Saunders, Joe Asmus

Andraya Yearwood (born August 15, 2001) is an African-American transgender student athlete from Connecticut. Yearwood began competing on a high school girls' team in early April 2017 as both a jumper and a sprinter, and won first place in the girls 100- and 200-meter dashes at that year's Connecticut Interscholastic Athletic Conference (CIAC) Class M Outdoor Track and Field State Championship. Yearwood's second-place finish at the CIAC State Open Track and Field Championship 100-yard dash finals on June 4, 2017, behind another transgender student, gained international media attention.

The decision of the State of Connecticut to allow her to compete on the women's team is a focus of debate surrounding Title IX and trans people. In 2018, writing on the subject of transgender people in sports, ESPN called Yearwood and a handful of other transgender athletes "focal points in a fight over the future of sports". She has competed without hormones or puberty blockers, which, according to Vice Media, "could have contributed to an advantage". However, Vice Media also stated that schools requiring medical treatment for transgender athletes would create a barrier to entry due to the costs of treatment.

== Track and Field Career ==
Throughout her high school career, Andraya Yearwood earned multiple individual state titles and podium finishes at the CIAC State Open and class championships, while also competing in relay events and varsity cheerleading. Her senior outdoor track season in 2020 was canceled due to the COVID-19 pandemic.

=== Personal Bests ===
Event	Performance	Location	Date	Notes
55 meters	7.01 s	New Haven, CT	February 16, 2019	Indoor; CIAC State Open finals
60 meters	7.72 s	Boston, MA	January 5, 2019	Indoor; New Balance National Championship
100 meters	12.17 s	New Britain, CT	June 4, 2018	Outdoor; CIAC State Open finals
200 meters	25.33 s	New Britain, CT	May 29, 2018	Outdoor; CIAC Class M Championships
300 meters	41.62 s	New Haven, CT	January 18, 2020	Indoor; SCC Coaches Invitational
400 meters	1:04.97 min	Middletown, CT	May 1, 2018	Outdoor; Middletown Varsity Dual
55 meters hurdles	9.18 s	New Haven, CT	February 7, 2019	Indoor; CIAC Class S State title
Triple jump	35 ft 10 in (10.92 m)	Cromwell, CT	May 14, 2019	Outdoor; Clinton Varsity Dual
Long jump	15 ft 0.75 in (4.59 m)	Deep River, CT	April 16, 2019	Outdoor; Valley Regional Varsity Dual
High jump	4 ft 6 in (1.37 m)	Durham, CT	April 23, 2018	Outdoor; Coginchaug Varsity Dual

=== Competition Record ===
Year	Competition	Level	Venue	Position	Event	Notes
2017	CIAC Class M Outdoor Championships	State (Class)	New Britain, CT	1st	100 meters	12.66 s
2017	CIAC Class M Outdoor Championships	State (Class)	New Britain, CT	1st	200 meters	26.08 s
2017	CIAC State Open Outdoor Championships	State (Overall)	New Britain, CT	3rd	100 meters	12.41 s; qualified for New England championships
2017	CIAC State Open Outdoor Championships	State (Overall)	New Britain, CT	8th	200 meters	26.91 s
2017	New England Interscholastic Outdoor Championships	Regional / Interstate	Norwell, MA	2nd	100 meters	12.58 s (Heat: 12.60 s); silver medal finish
2018	Shoreline Conference Outdoor Championships	Local	Deep River, CT	1st	100 meters	12.31 s
2018	Shoreline Conference Outdoor Championships	Local	Deep River, CT	1st	200 meters	25.58 s
2018	CIAC Class M Outdoor Championships	State (Class)	New Britain, CT	2nd	100 meters	Finished behind Terry Miller
2018	CIAC State Open Outdoor Championships	State (Overall)	New Britain, CT	2nd	100 meters	12.17 s; silver medal behind Terry Miller
2019	Shoreline Conference Indoor Championships	Local	New Haven, CT	1st	55 meters	7.34 s
2019	Shoreline Conference Indoor Championships	Local	New Haven, CT	1st	300 meters	44.10 s
2019	CIAC Class S Indoor Championships	State (Class)	New Haven, CT	1st	55 meter hurdles	9.18 s; career best
2019	CIAC Class S Indoor Championships	State (Class)	New Haven, CT	2nd	55 meters	7.31 s
2020	CIAC Class S Indoor Championships	State (Class)	New Haven, CT	2nd	4×400 meter relay	Representing Cromwell High School
2020	CIAC State Open Indoor Championships	State (Overall)	New Haven, CT	12th	4×400 meter relay	4:21.90 min

== Legal challenges ==
=== Petitions ===
In June 2018, the debate surrounding transgender inclusion in Connecticut high school sports intensified when Bianca Stanescu, the mother of cisgender track competitor Selina Soule, launched a public petition to alter the state's athletic policies. The petition was created after Soule placed sixth in the 100-meter dash at the state open championship, finishing behind transgender sprinters Terry Miller and Andraya Yearwood, who secured first and second place respectively. Stanescu’s petition, alongside other online petitions and public protests, argued that allowing athletes born biologically male to compete in female divisions created an insurmountable physical advantage.

In response to the growing public friction, Andraya Yearwood appeared on a national broadcast of Good Morning America to counter the petitions, advocate for transgender youth participation, and share the emotional toll of the public pushback. Concurrently, Yearwood's father, Rahsaan Yearwood, publicly defended her right to participate, emphasizing that her involvement was rooted in the fundamental developmental benefits of high school sports—such as camaraderie, grit, and teamwork—rather than a mere desire for competitive dominance.

The friction generated by these grassroots petitions transitioned into formal legal channels in June 2019. The conservative legal organization Alliance Defending Freedom (ADF) leveraged the parents' complaints to file a formal administrative discrimination complaint with the United States Department of Education's Office for Civil Rights (OCR) on behalf of cisgender runners Selina Soule, Alanna Smith, and Chelsea Mitchell. The complaint formally charged that the Connecticut Interscholastic Athletic Conference (CIAC) gender identity policy violated Title IX civil rights protections by costing cisgender girls podium finishes, championship titles, and prospective collegiate athletic scouting opportunities. In August 2019, the federal OCR advanced the petitions' structural goals by launching a formal civil rights investigation into the CIAC and several local school districts, drawing defensive representation from civil rights groups such as the American Civil Liberties Union (ACLU).

=== Soule v. Connecticut Association of Schools ===
==== Filing ====
On February 12, 2020, while the OCR investigation was still under way, Soule, Mitchell and Smith filed Soule v. Connecticut Association of Schools (No. 3:20-cv-00201) in the United States District Court for the District of Connecticut. They were represented by ADF attorneys including Kristen Waggoner, Christiana Holcomb, Roger Brooks and Jeffrey Shafer. Nicoletti later joined as a fourth plaintiff. The defendants were the Connecticut Association of Schools, which operates the CIAC, and the boards of education of Bloomfield, Canton, Cromwell, Danbury and Glastonbury.

The plaintiffs alleged that the CIAC policy, adopted in 2013, violated Title IX in two ways: by failing to effectively accommodate girls' athletic interests and abilities, and by failing to provide girls with treatment, benefits and opportunities equal to boys'. They claimed that Yearwood and Miller had together won 15 girls' state championship titles between 2017 and 2019. They sought four forms of relief, including (1) a preliminary injunction barring Yearwood and Miller from girls' events during the spring 2020 season; (2) a declaration that the policy violated Title IX and a permanent injunction against its enforcement; (3) damages; and (4) revision of past race results to remove Yearwood and Miller and move each athlete who had finished behind them up one place.

==== Intervention and early proceedings ====
On February 21, 2020, Yearwood and Miller moved to intervene as defendants. They were represented by Dan Barrett of the ACLU of Connecticut and by ACLU attorneys Chase Strangio, Joshua Block, James Esseks, Lindsey Kaley and Galen Sherwin. Judge Robert Chatigny granted the motion on April 22, 2020. The Connecticut Commission on Human Rights and Opportunities also moved to intervene in support of the policy. The CIAC maintained that its policy had been developed with federal and state guidance, and that courts and federal agencies had acknowledged that the meaning of "sex" in Title IX was ambiguous.

On April 8, 2020, Chatigny denied the plaintiffs' request to expedite their motion for a preliminary injunction, reasoning that the COVID-19 pandemic made a spring 2020 track season highly unlikely; the season was subsequently canceled. During an April 16, 2020 telephone hearing, Chatigny instructed the plaintiffs' counsel to refer to Yearwood and Miller as "transgender females" rather than "males". The plaintiffs moved on May 8, 2020, to disqualify him for bias; he denied the motion on June 16, 2020, and the Second Circuit denied the plaintiffs' petition for a writ of mandamus seeking his recusal in November 2020. The plaintiffs filed a second amended complaint on August 11, 2020, and the defendants moved to dismiss it on August 21, 2020.

==== Federal government involvement ====
On March 24, 2020, the Justice Department filed a statement of interest supporting the plaintiffs, signed by Attorney General William Barr, Assistant Attorney General Eric Dreiband and U.S. Attorney John Durham. It argued that Title IX prohibits discrimination on the basis of sex but not on the basis of transgender status. On May 28, 2020, the OCR concluded its investigation, finding that the CIAC and six school districts had violated Title IX and threatening to refer the matter to the Justice Department. Through the spring and summer of 2020, the OCR sent letters threatening to withhold some federal funding from districts that followed the policy; Connecticut officials disputed its conclusions. On April 20, 2020, the school district defendants moved to add the Education Department as a party, citing the risk of conflicting outcomes between the lawsuit and the OCR proceeding.

On February 23, 2021, three days before a scheduled hearing on the motion to dismiss, the Justice Department and the OCR under the Biden administration withdrew their support for the lawsuit. Durham informed the court that "the government has reconsidered the matter", and the government stated that the Education Department's earlier policy statements had been issued without the review required for agency guidance. Because of the withdrawal, the court denied the motion to add the Education Department as a party on March 30, 2021.

After returning to office in January 2025, President Donald Trump directed the Department of Education to enforce Title IX "on the basis of biological sex", reverting to guidance issued during his first term, and in February 2025 he signed an executive order titled "Keeping Men Out of Women's Sports". On May 2, 2025, Craig Trainor, the department's acting assistant secretary for civil rights, notified Cromwell Superintendent Enza Macri that the Office for Civil Rights (OCR) was opening an investigation into Cromwell Public Schools, the district for which Yearwood had competed. The investigation examined whether the district violated Title IX by allowing transgender students to participate in sports and use restrooms and locker rooms consistent with their gender identity. OCR used an expedited "Rapid Resolution Process". Trainor wrote that opening an investigation was not itself evidence of a violation, but described the Cromwell Board of Education's policy on transgender students as being in irreconcilable conflict with federal law.

Cromwell Mayor James Demetriades said that nearly $1 million in federal special education funding was at risk, that the district was following state and federal law and the CIAC's rules, and that excluding transgender athletes would make it ineligible for any CIAC sport. He said the district had no transgender athletes competing in CIAC high school sports at the time, and asked state officials to shield the town from liability and to intervene if the Justice Department sued. Macri told families that the district was committed both to a welcoming environment for all students and to following anti-discrimination law while it reviewed its policies with OCR. State Representative Christie Carpino, a Republican representing Cromwell, said that allegations of civil rights violations should be vigorously pursued, and asked Governor Ned Lamont for guidance on what she described as conflicting state and federal policies.

On June 3, 2025, students, parents and LGBTQ+ advocates rallied at Cromwell High School before a Board of Education meeting. The board voted to table action, declining to sign OCR's proposed resolution agreement as written and requesting more time to review it. The same week, the Connecticut State Department of Education confirmed that OCR had also opened investigations into Bloomfield Public Schools, where Terry Miller had competed, and Canton Public Schools. Federal funding at stake was estimated at about $1.26 million for Cromwell, $3.3 million for Bloomfield and $700,000 for Canton. Cromwell, Bloomfield and Canton were among the school districts named as defendants in Soule; Danbury and Glastonbury, also defendants, had not received investigation notices as far as the state department knew. The CIAC said its policy for transgender athletes remained unchanged.

Lamont said the state complied with federal law and would not tolerate the targeting of transgender students. Attorney General William Tong called the investigations unlawful, citing Bostock v. Clayton County, and said his office was considering legal options. Dan Barrett, legal director of the ACLU of Connecticut, said state law would conflict with Title IX only if a higher court adopted the position that Title IX requires excluding transgender girls.

==== Dismissal ====
On April 25, 2021, Chatigny granted the motion to dismiss on three grounds: First, he found the request to enjoin the policy moot because Yearwood and Miller had graduated in June 2020, making the prospect of the remaining high school plaintiffs competing against another transgender athlete with similar times in the same events a "speculative contingency." Second, he ruled that the plaintiffs lacked standing to seek revised athletic records because whether those changes would affect their college scholarship or employment prospects depended on guesswork about independent decision-makers. Finally, he held that monetary damages were barred because the defendants had not received the notice required under Title IX before a school can be held financially liable, though he noted that Smith and Nicoletti could file a new action if a transgender student registered to compete in girls' track.

==== Appeals ====
The plaintiffs appealed on May 26, 2021. On December 16, 2022, a three-judge panel of the Second Circuit affirmed the dismissal. The plaintiffs had conceded on appeal that the injunction claim was moot. The panel held that they lacked standing to seek revised records, and that the defendants lacked notice for damages purposes, noting that Title IX's language tracks that of Title VII, which the Supreme Court had held in Bostock v. Clayton County (2020) prohibits discrimination against transgender people. Writing for the panel, Judge Denny Chin observed that the plaintiffs had regularly competed in state championships and had often finished first, and that the records documented their accomplishments as well as Yearwood's and Miller's.

On February 13, 2023, the Second Circuit granted rehearing en banc, and oral argument was held on June 6, 2023. On December 15, 2023, the en banc court reversed the panel, vacated the dismissal and remanded the case. All of the court's judges agreed that the plaintiffs had plausibly alleged an injury in the form of lost titles and placements, though the court was otherwise divided, issuing three concurrences, three partial concurrences and several dissents. The majority, written by Judge Alison Nathan, held that the plaintiffs had standing because their injury could plausibly be redressed by injunctive relief or damages, and directed the district court to decide the damages question together with the merits. The ruling did not address whether the CIAC policy actually violated Title IX. In a separate concurrence joined by one other judge, Nathan wrote that to prevail, the plaintiffs would have to prove that Title IX requires schools to exclude transgender girls from girls' teams.

==== Remand and current status ====
On March 4, 2024, the plaintiffs filed a third amended complaint, which narrowed their requested relief to correcting historical records rather than barring transgender athletes from competition. The defendants moved to dismiss it on April 3, 2024. On November 5, 2024, after a hearing that August, the district court denied the motions. It held that the plaintiffs had plausibly alleged a disparate treatment claim, and that their own school districts could potentially be held liable under Title IX.

On January 2, 2025, the case was referred to Magistrate Judge Robert A. Richardson for a settlement conference; on March 7, 2025, the court found the settlement talks unproductive. On July 16, 2025, the case was reassigned to Judge Sarala V. Nagala. On August 28, 2025, Nagala granted in part the defendants' motion to pause the case pending the Supreme Court's decisions in Little v. Hecox and West Virginia v. B.P.J., staying depositions, expert discovery and motion practice while allowing written discovery to be completed.

Yearwood later filed amicus curiae briefs supporting transgender students' participation in girls' sports, first with the Supreme Court of the United States in Little v. Hecox and West Virginia v. B.P.J. in November 2025, and with the United States Court of Appeals for the Eighth Circuit in Female Athletes United v. Ellison, a challenge to Minnesota's policy allowing transgender students to compete consistent with their gender identity.

On June 30, 2026, the Supreme Court decided both cases 6–3 in an opinion by Justice Brett Kavanaugh, holding that Title IX and the Equal Protection Clause permit states to limit girls' and women's teams based on biological sex. The Court did not decide whether either provision requires such restrictions, noting that question was the subject of ongoing litigation in lower courts, including the Connecticut case. On July 6, 2026, the Connecticut Commission on Human Rights and Opportunities stated that transgender students remained protected under Connecticut state law. As of October 2026, the case remains pending before Nagala.

== Media and Public Profile ==
=== Changing the Game (2019/2021) ===
Andraya Yearwood is one of three subjects of Changing the Game, a 2019 documentary directed by Michael Barnett about transgender high school athletes, alongside wrestler Mack Beggs and skier Sarah Rose Huckman. The film premiered at the 2019 Tribeca Film Festival and was released by Hulu on June 1, 2021. It won the GLAAD Media Award for Outstanding Documentary and was nominated for a Primetime Emmy Award.

Andraya Yearwood starting out of the sprinting blocks.

The film shows Yearwood competing on Cromwell High School's girls' track team with the support of her teammates and coach. It follows her friendship with fellow transgender sprinter Terry Miller, who says in the film that Yearwood's openness inspired her to come out. The film depicts opposition to her participation from parents of other athletes who believed she had an unfair advantage, as well as insults directed at her at meets. Her coach and her mother, Ngozi Nnaji, argue in the film that excluding her could endanger her, pointing to the high rate of suicide attempts among transgender youth. In the film, Yearwood discusses her journey toward living as her authentic self and the opposition she faced growing up.

Producer Alex Schmider said Yearwood's story had become a flashpoint in media coverage of transgender athletes, and described the film's aim as returning such stories to their subjects. In Paste, Jacob Oller described Yearwood's arc in the film as that of an "unintentional inspiration". In 2021, the Texas Tribune Festival included her among its speakers, identifying her as a star of the film.

=== Joy Run (2020) ===
Yearwood and Terry Miller appear in Joy Run, a short film directed by the transgender artist and filmmaker Tourmaline for the fashion label Chromat's autumn/winter 2020 collection. Made in partnership with Reebok, which produced a limited-edition sneaker for the collection, the film premiered on September 15, 2020, on the Council of Fashion Designers of America's Runway360 platform during the New York Fashion Week, held online because of the COVID-19 pandemic.

Framed around sport as a source of pleasure, mutual encouragement and joy in one's body, the film intercuts recorded video calls with its guests with footage of the collection modeled on a playground. Alongside Yearwood and Miller, its guests included ACLU attorney Chase Strangio, who represented the two in the Connecticut lawsuit, and the artist Chella Man. In the film, Yearwood and Miller discuss the discrimination faced by transgender athletes and the importance of speaking out; Yearwood asks, "If we are not going to, then who is?"

=== Vice Investigates (2020) ===
In March 2020, Yearwood and her mother, Ngozi Nnaji, appeared in the seventh episode of the Hulu original documentary series Vice Investigates, titled "Defending Champions." Hosted by correspondent Gianna Toboni, the episode explored the systemic policing, biological arguments, and legal challenges surrounding transgender and intersex athletes in competitive sports. The segment focused on Yearwood's experiences as a high school track athlete at Cromwell High School, highlighting how she faced intense community opposition and public scrutiny despite receiving support from her school administration. The documentary also examined the Title IX federal lawsuit filed against Connecticut's inclusive policies by the Alliance Defending Freedom (ADF), featuring Yearwood's perspective on how the legal and media arguments reduced her identity strictly to biology.

=== Running While Black (2022) ===
In 2022, Yearwood was featured in Running While Black, a three-part documentary series produced by Religion of Sports with VICE TV and Adidas. Directed by Jenn Shaw and narrated by Jackie Joyner-Kersee, the series consists of episodes of about 20 minutes each and examines racial disparities in sport and the fear that running can hold for Black communities in the wake of the murder of Ahmaud Arbery. The episodes were released on VICE TV's YouTube channel and website between June 7 and July 7, 2022, and aired on VICE TV beginning June 18.

Yearwood appears in the second episode, released on June 28, 2022, which focuses on running as a source of community and support. Alongside segments on the Brooklyn women's running group We Run Brownsville and historian Gary Corbitt, son of long-distance running pioneer Ted Corbitt, the episode profiles Yearwood, then 20, as a Black transgender athlete from Connecticut who had faced racism and transphobia. She describes how the 2020 lawsuit seeking to bar transgender athletes from girls' sports left her anxious and without the desire to compete, saying she had grown tired of having to defend herself; though she no longer runs competitively, she continues to run for enjoyment.

The series won Gold for Best Branded Content at the 2023 Festival of Media North America, where it was also Highly Commended for Inclusive Campaign of the Year, and was shortlisted for Best Branded Content or Series at the 5th Hashtag Sports Awards.

=== Queer Sports (2023) ===
In 2023, Yearwood was featured in two episodes of the Vice TV weekly docuseries Queer Sports, hosted by Arielle Duhaime-Ross. In Episode 3, titled "Trans Athletes Address the 'Debate'," she participated in a roundtable panel alongside Veronica Ivy, Cat Runner, and Frankie De La Cretaz to analyze the emotional tax and institutional policies affecting transgender competitors. In a later episode, entitled "The Next Fight Over Women's Equality In Sports", Yearwood was the subject of a one-on-one spotlight interview examining the intersection of identity, systemic media pressure, and her personal resilience as a Black trans athlete.

== Education ==
Yearwood received recruitment interest from Harvard University, the University of Connecticut, Springfield College, and West Point to run track and field in the NCAA. Beginning in the fall of 2020, she was a student at North Carolina Central University (NCCU), a Historically Black University (HBCU) in Durham, North Carolina. During her undergraduate studies, Yearwood intentionally declined to participate in intercollegiate athletics to have the academic freedom necessary to pursue international study. In 2022, she completed the first semester of her junior year abroad at New York University Buenos Aires in Argentina. While there, she worked with the Diáspora Africana de la Argentina (DIAFAR) to ideate the “Afrodescendientes y Africanos en Argentina: Herencia, Realidad y Desafíos” and “Comunidad LGBTIQ+ y Antirracismo: Una Mirada Afroestadounidense” seminars for the Escuela Internacional de Formación para Jóvenes Antirracistas with the Universidad Metropolitana para la Educación y el Trabajo (Metropolitan University for Education and Work) Núcleo de Estudios sobre Racismo y Desigualdades to empower youth via anti-racism. She'd also perform ENG-PORT-SPAN translations of DIAFAR’s El Afroargentino, the first dedicated newspaper for the Afro-Argentine community in the 21st century.

Photograph of activist Andraya Yearwood delivering the charla "Comunidad LGTBIQ+ y Antirracismo" at DIAFAR's Espacio Malcolm in Buenos Aires.

This intensive immersion program allowed her to deepen her fluency in Spanish and intercultural competence of the Afro-Argentine diaspora. The summer following her coursework in Argentina, Yearwood expanded her linguistic focus to Portuguese. She is only the second student from NCCU to be selected for the prestigious Critical Language Scholarship Program, a fully-funded initiative sponsored by the United States Department of State aimed at mastering languages crucial to national security and global commerce. Through the CLS program, Yearwood underwent rigorous linguistic and cultural immersion at the Pontifical Catholic University of Rio de Janeiro (PUC-Rio), which required adhering to a strict, native-only language policy. In addition to Spanish and Portuguese, she studied Italian, American Sign Language, Albanian, Igbo and Swahili. Andraya began her language journey in the seventh grade by using an organic, self-taught immersion method. She would listen to Spanish reggaeton and Brazilian funk, manually translating the lyrics into English and Italian. Through this process, she learned context-specific slang, irregular verb inflection, and syntactic pattern recognition. As a high schooler she was in the process of learning 13 languages. While in high school, Andraya enrolled in the Early College Experience (ECE) Program at the University of Connecticut (UConn), as she had surpassed the curricular offerings at Cromwell High.

She graduated magna cum Laude in the spring of 2024 with a Bachelor of Arts degree in Spanish Language and Literature and a Bachelor of Arts degree in Interdisciplinary Studies: Concentration in Race, Gender, and Class. In addition to her aforementioned degrees, she earned two minors in Political Science and Women's and Gender Studies. Even though she was ultimately required to choose only two, Andraya Yearwood had also fulfilled the course requirements for a third minor in Hispanophone Africana Studies—a program unique to North Carolina Central University. As a result, Yearwood received the Milagros Carballo Award for Excellence in Spanish at the 72nd and 74th Annual Honors Convocations. The award is given by the Department of Language and Literature, distinct from its general "Award for Excellence in the Study of Spanish." Under the department's counsel, Andraya's thesis committee consisted of professors John S. Prince (department chair), Stefanie Frigo (co-advisor), and Javier E. Álvarez-Jaimes (co-advisor). She culminated her undergraduate training with the honors thesis: "Desentrañando los feminismos florecientes en la antología literaria latinoamericana: La reivindicación de la autonomía femenina desde Sor Juana Inés de la Cruz hasta José Joaquín Fernández de Lizardi en el Virreinato de Nueva España (XVI-XVIII)". During NCCU's 143rd commencement on May 4, 2024, Chancellor Johnson O. Akinleye publicly recognized her as the university's inaugural recipient of the Foreign Language and Area Studies Fellowship in Portuguese at Columbia University in the City of New York. Fully-funded by the United States Department of Education, the fellowship provided a $20,000 stipend and up to $18,000 toward tuition, with the Columbia University Graduate School of Arts and Sciences covering the remainder of her fees.

Chancellor Johnson O. Akinleye and Andraya Yearwood at North Carolina Central University's 143rd Commencement: Baccalaureate Ceremony.

She had been admitted to the MA Sociocultural Linguistics at Goldsmiths, University of London in New Cross, London but chose Columbia after receiving the fellowship. The summer immediately following her college graduation, Andraya received the HBCU Merit Scholarship to fully fund her studies at the School of Spanish at the Middlebury College Language Schools in Middlebury, Vermont. In her second year of college, she was encouraged to attend Middlebury's School of Portuguese by her Spanish professor Javier E. Álvarez-Jaimes, who had spent the previous summer there studying Brazilian Portuguese. In September of that year, Andraya pursued a Master of Arts degree at the Institute of Latin American Studies (ILAS) at Columbia University in the City of New York, holding affiliations with the Institute for the Study of Sexuality and Gender and ILAS's Lemann Center for Brazilian Studies at the Columbia University School of International and Public Affairs (SIPA). While pursuing her degree through the 1988-established New York City Consortium for Latin American Studies, she held on-campus visitorship at New York University's Department of Spanish and Portuguese Languages and Literatures and its Center for Latin American and Caribbean Studies (CLACS) from August 2024 to May 2025. Andraya studied under the tutelage of visiting Afro-Brazilian philosopher Djamila Ribeiro at NYU's King Juan Carlos I of Spain Center Espacio de Culturas, enrolling in the professor's doctoral seminar "Feminisms from the South". This research conducted at NYU culminated in Yearwood's engagement with The Black Feminist Collective. Further uptown in Morningside Heights, Andraya Yearwood's theoretical trajectory was deeply shaped by the Department of Anthropology faculty. Andraya was challenged to rethink conventional frameworks of kinship, power, and marginality, having been instructed from then-chair of Columbia's anthropology department, Rosalind C. Morris, via her Anthropology of the Sister course. Beyond traditional anthropology, her scholartivism was heavily influenced by her time in Anthony Johnson’s course, Ethnography in Black Communities, in the Department of African American and African Diaspora Studies (AAADS) and the Institute for Research in African-American Studies (IRAAS). Her M.A. thesis, titled "'Samba’o na cara da sociedade': A Quare Linguistic Anthropological Account of Brazilian Portuguese," applies quare theory to linguistic anthropological methodology to investigate how Afro-Brazilian LGBTQIA+ communities use pajubá—a traditional queer sociolect combining Portuguese with West African elements—to articulate Black queer identities and push back against systemic marginalization and national myths of an "Afro-paradise". Her thesis was advised by João Nemi Neto, the Director of the Department of Latin American and Iberian Cultures's Portuguese Language Program, and Gustavo Silva Azenha, the Executive Director of the Institute of Latin American Studies and Lecturer in Anthropology. It is the first application of quare linguistic anthropological theory and method to a non-Anglophone language, since the coinage of quare linguistic anthropology in 2019.

== Career ==
Post-graduation from Columbia in May 2025, Andraya served as the Youth Advocacy Fellow with the New York Transgender Advocacy Group (NYTAG) in Manhattan's Flatiron District, supporting youth-led grassroots lobbying, popular mobilization, and donor prospects to advance equity for transgender and gender non-conforming protections throughout the State of New York. She worked with the ACLU and Lambda Legal to coordinate mobilization strategy during precedentary SCOTUS oral arguments for West Virginia v. BPJ and Little v. Hecox and with the Hunter College-CUNY Silberman School of Social Work Center for Sexuality and Gender on the 2025 Countering Narrative Initiative's Trans Joy Storytelling Project spotlighting intersectional TGNC/TGNCNB across the five boroughs. The same year, she was interviewed for Youth Activist Oral Histories, a collection of oral histories with young activists in movements including LGBTQ+ rights and gender equity, compiled by students in Duke University's FOCUS Program taught by historian Wesley Hogan of the John Hope Franklin Humanities Institute, and archived in the Duke Research Data Repository.

As of 2026, Andraya Yearwood is assistant director of the Gender and Sexuality Resource Center at Fort Lewis College in Durango, Colorado, where she also serves as staff advisor for the center's Sexuality and Gender Alliance and chairs the 2SLGBTQIA+ Faculty and Staff Advisory Committee under the Office of the President. In September 2026, she was named the Reconciliation and Educating Character Initiative: Language Reclamation Fellow of the Center for Indigenous Research, Culture, and Language (CIRCL) at the college, bolstering her ethnopragmatic and semiotic anthropological expertise to spearhead the "Indigenous Language Student Showcase" alongside the Center for Reconciliation's Indigenous Language Recording Studio. This work is largely supported by the Lilly Endowment Inc. and the Wake Forest University Program for Leadership and Character Educating Character Initiative “Institutional Reconciliation as a Transformative Character Education Opportunity” Institutional Impact Grant.

== Selected Works ==
=== Books ===
- Yearwood, Rahsaan; Yearwood, Andraya (2026). Let Her Be: A Father's Story of Love, Identity and Learning to See His Daughter Beyond the Words "Trans" and "Transgender". ASIN B0HPL7SDHT.

=== Book chapters ===
- Yearwood, Andraya (2024). "Juggling Two Worlds: Spotlight Narrative". In Davis, Shardé M. (ed.). Being Black in the Ivory: Truth-Telling about Racism in Higher Education. University of North Carolina Press. pp. 34–36. doi:10.5149/northcarolina/9781469678269.003.0008. ISBN 978-1-4696-7826-9.

=== Journal articles ===
- Yearwood, Andraya (December 12, 2025). "A Grande Contradição da América do Sul Lusófona: De quem são as verdades vividas que não estamos a contar? Uma análise comparativa de Cidade de Deus (2002), de Meirelles, e Afro-Paradise (2016), de Smith" [The Great Contradiction of Lusophone South America: Whose Lived Truths Are We Not Telling? A Comparative Analysis of Meirelles's City of God (2002) and Smith's Afro-Paradise (2016)]. Mester (in Portuguese). 54. doi:10.5070/M3.41990.
- Yearwood, Andraya (February 10, 2026). "Legislating Silence or Sounding Identity? The Paradox of Intercultural Bilingual Education in Argentina". SSRN 6210298.

=== Other writing ===
- Yearwood, Andraya (June 2023). "BLACK KUIR JOY". Anchor Health Pride Zine. p. 18.
- Yearwood, Andraya (March 28, 2025). "An Amefrican Historization of a Queer Afro-Brazilian Argot: Language, Non-Normative Identity, and Intersectional Feminist Legacy". Black Feminist Collective. Presented at the 2025 Columbia University Institute for the Study of Sexuality and Gender Annual Conference.

=== Theses ===
- Yearwood, Andraya (2025). Samba'o na cara da sociedade: A Quare Linguistic Anthropological Account of Brazilian Portuguese (MA thesis). Columbia University. doi:10.7916/4nps-en34.

=== Oral histories ===
- Kendrick, Elena; Yearwood, Andraya (interviewers) (2023). Amber Esters – Social Worker (BSPH '14). Black Women's Oral History Archive. Collected Lady Eagle Oral-History Project Training and Research Acumen (CLEOPATRA), North Carolina Central University.
