= Transgender people in sports =

The participation of transgender people in competitive sports, a traditionally sex-segregated institution, has become a subject of debate and controversy, particularly in relation to the inclusion of transgender women and girls in women's sports.

Opponents of including transgender athletes in competitive sports argue that physiological differences create unfair advantages and safety concerns, while proponents highlight the effects of hormone therapy and the importance of inclusion. These debates have led to scrutiny of sex verification and eligibility rules, which some view as necessary for fairness and others as discriminatory. With no unified international policy, individual sports organizations set their own standards, and some have restricted transgender women's participation in women's categories.

Historically, transgender athletes were often excluded or required to compete based on their sex as assigned at birth. As gender-affirming treatments became more common, sports bodies introduced criteria like hormone requirements and sex verification. The International Olympic Committee has mandated sex verification for the Olympic Games since the 1930s and has adjusted its policy since then. In 2026, it limited participation in women's events to women whose female sex is confirmed with a test for the SRY gene.

== History of transgender people in sports ==
Historically, sport has been seen as a male domain. The masculine perception of sport was first moderated with the rise of women's sports and further challenged with the gradual acceptance of gay sportsmen. A third departure from tradition occurred with the emergence of trans athletes, many of whom challenge the culturally accepted binary gender norms of male and female.

Transgender participation in sports has evolved alongside broader social and medical developments since the mid-twentieth century. Early policies often excluded transgender athletes or required them to compete according to their sex assigned at birth, reflecting the binary gender enforcement that historically defined sports participation. As gender-affirming medical treatments became more available, sports organizations introduced eligibility criteria such as hormone requirements and sex verification procedures to regulate participation in gendered categories.

=== Notable figures ===
During the 1930s, several prominent athletes publicly transitioned. Zdeněk Koubek was a Czechoslovak runner who announced his gender transition in 1935, a year after he won gold at the Women's World Games. He changed his name, underwent gender-affirming surgery and pursued changes to the sex marker on his legal identification. Koubek's transition was the subject of international news, and he shared some of his experiences in interviews. After the Belgian cyclist Willy de Bruyn read about Koubek's transition, he wrote about his own transition via the 1937 De Dag article "A New Life – How I Changed From a Woman Into a Man". Mark Weston and Witold Smętek also transitioned publicly that decade.

==== Renée Richards ====
One of the earliest high-profile transgender athletes was tennis player Renée Richards. Richards was a promising tennis player in the men's circuit who then underwent gender reassignment therapy in 1975 and started playing in women's tournaments a year later. Her discovery resulted in a media frenzy which sparked protests. After she accepted an invitation to a warm-up tournament for the US Open, the Women's Tennis Association (WTA) and the United States Tennis Association (USTA) withdrew their support and 25 of the 32 women pulled out of the tournament.

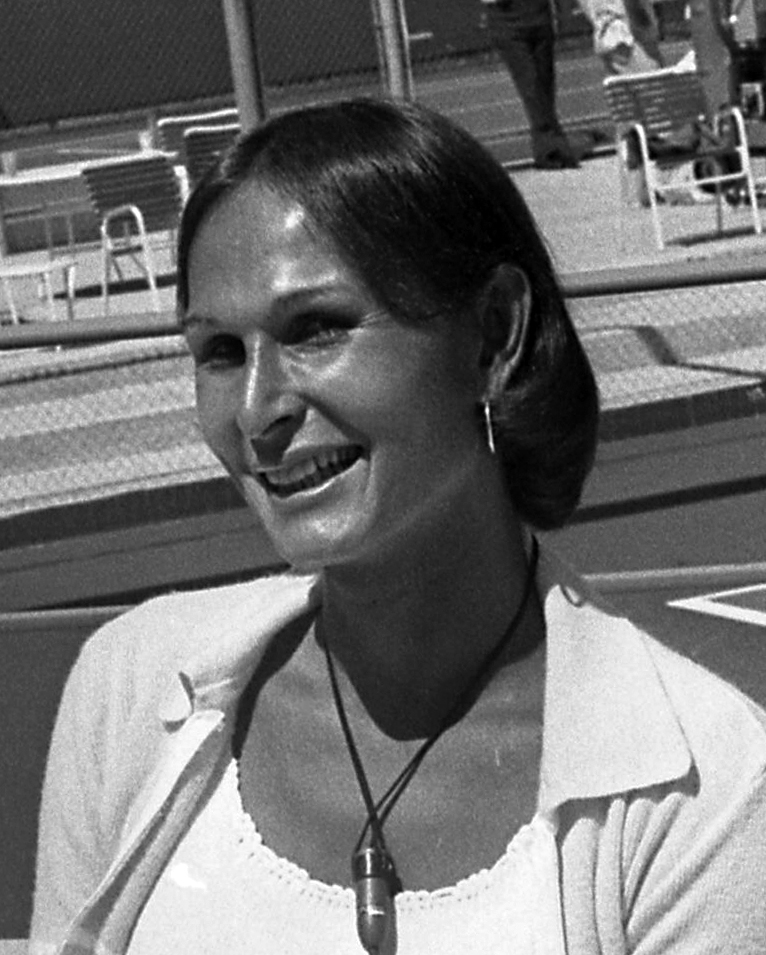
Renée Richards in 1976

As a result, the United States Tennis Association and Women's Tennis Association introduced the Barr body test, which identifies a person's sex chromosomes. Richards refused to take the test and was banned from the U.S. Open.

She filed a lawsuit in 1977, claiming that her civil rights were violated and that the policy was unfair. The New York Supreme Court ruled in her favor, saying that the Barr body test as the sole determinant of sex was "grossly unfair" and ruled Richards legally female.

She competed in the 1977 US Open at the age of 43. She reached the doubles final and subsequently retired four years later. At the time, the ruling in Richards's case did not lead to major changes for transgender athletes outside of tennis.

==== Lia Thomas ====
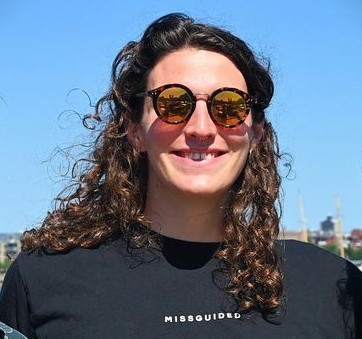
Lia Thomas swam for the University of Pennsylvania men's swim team and later the women's swim team

Since 2021, media has widely covered University of Pennsylvania student Lia Thomas, who swam for the men's team in 2018–2019, and for the women's team in 2021. In December 2021, USA Swimming official Cynthia Millen resigned in protest, because of her belief that Thomas has an unfair advantage over her competitors. The Washington Post wrote that Thomas had "shattered school records". In February 2022, CNN called Thomas "the face of the debate on transgender women in sports". In March 2022, she became the first openly transgender athlete to win an NCAA Division I national championship in any sport after winning the women's 500-yard freestyle event.

Thomas lost muscle mass and strength through testosterone suppression and hormone replacement therapy. Her time for the 500 freestyle is over 15 seconds slower than her personal bests before medically transitioning. Thomas's winning time of 4:33.24 was 9.18 seconds short of Katie Ledecky's NCAA record of 4:24.06. In other races, Thomas has been beaten by multiple cisgender women as well as by Iszac Henig, a transgender man not on hormones. In July 2025, after the Trump administration had previously cut the University of Pennsylvania's federal funding in March 2025, UPenn agreed to apologize to female athletes "disadvantaged" by Thomas' participation on the women's swimming teams and update University records based on the Administration's changed interpretation of Title IX, while still crediting Thomas with setting those records in the 2021–2022 season in accordance with the eligibility guidelines at the time.

==== Others ====
In 1996, the Iron Ladies, a men's volleyball team made up of gay men and transgender women from Thailand, won the national championship. The Iron Ladies were not allowed to join Thailand's national volleyball team because of the way they dressed.

The first out transgender person to make a US national team was Chris Mosier, who in 2016 qualified for Team USA in duathlon. Mosier is considered the catalyst for the change in the IOC policy on transgender athletes in 2015, when he challenged the policy after initially being banned from the world championship race. Mosier also became the first known transgender athlete to compete in the Olympic Trials in the gender with which they identify, and the first trans man to make a men's Olympic Trials, when he competed in January 2020 in the US Olympic Team Trials in the 50k Racewalking event.

In 2017, Mack Beggs, a teenager from Texas, was required to wrestle against girls throughout the season of his transition from female to male up through the state championship, despite wanting to wrestle against boys. This was due to state sport regulations requiring athletes to compete alongside athletes of their assigned sex. Some opponents say the testosterone prescribed as part of his transition gives him an unfair advantage and made it unsafe for the other wrestlers. (He finished the regular season at 52–0 and won the state championship.)

In October 2018, Veronica Ivy (then known as Rachel McKinnon) won a gold medal at the cycling Masters World Track Championship in Los Angeles.

In August 2022, USA Cycling, citing new regulations on trans athletes, retroactively stripped trans woman Leia Genis of her silver medal earned at the Track National Championships that had taken place in 2022.

In 2024, the San Jose State Spartans (SJSU) women's volleyball team received national attention due to the inclusion of a transgender player on the team and lawsuits that have attempted to rule the player ineligible. These lawsuits were filed not only by players from other teams but also an SJSU teammate and coach. The volleyball teams of Southern Utah, Boise State, Wyoming, Utah State, and Nevada canceled their games with the team, with Nevada's players stating that they "refuse to participate in any match that advances injustice against female athletes." The 2024 team finished with a 12–6 record, with 6 of their wins coming via forfeit.

In 2025, the World's Strongest Woman competition received criticism when transgender athlete Jammie Booker initially won the event. She was thereafter retroactively disqualified due to being "biologically male" per the competition's official rules. Andrea Thompson, who had finished second, was declared the winner but was angry that Booker "…lied and was very dishonest, and took away a lot of things from a lot of women.”

==== Trans men ====
- Kye Allums, basketball
- Schuyler Bailar, swimming
- Hergie Bacyadan, boxing, wushu and vovinam
- Mack Beggs, wrestling
- Harrison Browne, ice hockey
- Willy De Bruyn, cycling
- Keelin Godsey, hammer throw
- Iszac Henig, swimming
- Zdeněk Koubek, track
- Andreas Krieger, shot put
- Patricio Manuel, boxing
- Chris Mosier, triathlon and duathlon

==== Trans women ====
- Tifanny Abreu, volleyball
- Frances Anderson, cue sports
- Mianne Bagger, golf
- Savannah Burton, dodgeball
- Parinya Charoenphol, Thai boxing
- Roberta Cowell, motor sports
- Michelle Duff, motorcycle road racing
- Michelle Dumaresq, downhill mountain biking
- Fallon Fox, mixed martial arts
- Natalie van Gogh, cycling
- Laurel Hubbard, weightlifting
- Veronica Ivy, cycling
- Lauren Jeska, fell running
- Janae Kroc, powerlifting
- Bobbi Lancaster, golf
- Charlie Christina Martin, motor sports
- Danielle McGahey, cricket
- Cate McGregor, cricket
- Hannah Mouncey, handball and Australian football
- Valentina Petrillo, Paralympic sprinting
- Jessica Platt, ice hockey
- Apayauq Reitan, Iditarod
- Renée Richards, tennis
- Nyla Rose, pro wrestling
- Lia Smith, diving
- Cece Telfer, track and field
- Lia Thomas, swimming
- Andraya Yearwood, track and field (high school)

==== Non-binary athletes ====
- Nikki Hiltz, track and field
- Timothy LeDuc, figure skating
- Robyn Lambird, wheelchair racing
- Max Lindsey, pro wrestling
- Quinn, soccer
- Alana Smith, skateboarding
- Maria "Maz" Strong, Paralympic seated shot put

== Sex verification in sports organizations ==
Sports organizations have sought a test for sex verification to verify the sex of participating athletes.

This began in the 1940s with "femininity certificates" provided by a physician. In the 1960s, visual genital inspections were used to confirm gender, followed by chromosomal analysis to detect the presence of the SRY and DYZ1 genes, normally found on the Y chromosome. These tests were all designed to ensure that athletes were only allowed to compete as their sex, but mostly resulted in the exclusion of intersex athletes. Some LGBTQ advocates have referred to sex verification policies as "genital inspection" and "gender policing" of female athletes.

The first mandatory sex test issued by the International Association of Athletics Federations (IAAF), the world's track and field governing body, for woman athletes was in July 1950 in the month before the European Championships in Belgium. All athletes were tested in their own countries. Sex testing at the actual games began with the 1966 European Athletics Championships' response to suspicion that several of the best women athletes from the Soviet Union and Eastern Europe were actually men. At the Olympics, testing was introduced in 1968. In some cases, these policies have led to athletes undergoing unnecessary surgery such as female genital mutilation and sterilization. Subsequent reports have shown that the tests could cause psychological harm. Sex verification—identifying athletes whose hormone levels are abnormal compared to others of their purported sex – can cause sex identity crises, elicit demeaning reactions (publicly and privately), isolate athletes socially, and lead to depression and sometimes suicide.

More recently, testosterone levels have become the focus and, at the same time, new guidelines have been sought that would allow successfully-transitioned athletes to compete. Since the proposition in 2003 to use testosterone levels, reputable organizations such as the IOC have adopted strict policies that employ testosterone as a metric to allow successfully transitioned female athletes to compete. More recent guidelines have focused entirely on testosterone levels, such as the IOC's current guidelines, originally set in November 2015, which set limits on transgender athletes' testosterone levels for them to be permitted in women's competition categories. Controversy surrounding the 2020 Tokyo Olympics also centered around testosterone levels, specifically over whether the IOC's guidelines should be amended to set stricter testosterone limits, although this proposed change has been strongly debated. The testing of testosterone alone as a marker for athleticism has been debated.

The increased visibility of trans women in professional sports has led to debates on the IOC policies. Many scientists criticize the policies because of published papers showing that people who went through male puberty retain significant advantages even after a year of testosterone suppression. In July 2021, the IOC's medical and science director, Richard Budgett, stated that the 2015 guidelines were outdated. In 2022, new guidelines were released. According to reporting by Sports Illustrated, the new framework "places the responsibility of establishing guidelines for trans inclusion on each individual sport. It also concludes that sporting bodies should not assume that transgender women have an inherent advantage over cisgender women, nor should transgender women have to reduce their testosterone levels to compete." The framework has been criticized by some medical experts who work for sports federations as ignoring the science on sex, gender, and performance and leading to unfair competition. They suggested that rules based on testosterone could vary based on sport and called on the IOC to set standards for sports to follow.

From 1 September 2025, World Athletics will require a one-off genetic test for any athlete seeking to compete in the female category at world-ranking events. The rules will also apply to the September 2025 World Athletics Championships.

== Testosterone and athletic ability ==
Sex differences in human physiology impact performance in sports. Debate over whether and how transgender women should compete in female sports often has to do with whether they have an unfair advantage over cisgender women due to higher testosterone levels and skeletal, muscle and fat distribution differences. Testosterone regulates many different functions in the body, including the development and maintenance of bone and muscle mass.

A 2018 extended essay analyzed the IOC rule set in 2015 (testosterone below 10 nmol/L for trans women) and found that "the advantage to trans women afforded by the IOC guidelines is an intolerable unfairness", while they propose to abandon male/female categories in favor of a more nuanced division.

A 2021 literature review concluded that for trans women, even with testosterone suppression, "the data show that strength, lean body mass, muscle size and bone density are only trivially affected. The reductions observed in muscle mass, size, and strength are very small compared to the baseline differences between males and females in these variables, and thus, there are major performance and safety implications in sports where these attributes are competitively significant." After 24 months of testosterone suppression, bone mass is generally preserved. The review states that no study has reported muscle loss greater than 12% with testosterone suppression even after three years of hormone therapy. It found that trans women are in the top 10% of females regarding lean body mass and possess a grip 25% stronger than most females. They suggest that instead of universal guidelines, each individual sport federation decide how to "balance between inclusion, safety and fairness" due to differences between sports.

A 2021 systematic review found that significant decreases in measures of strength, lean body mass and muscle area were observed after 12 months of hormone therapy, while the values remained above those observed in cisgender women, even after 36 months, suggesting that trans women "may retain strength advantages over cisgender women." Effects of longer duration therapy were unclear due to scarcity of data.

A 38-page draft document from World Rugby's transgender working group in 2020 acknowledged that rugby players who are cisgender women, when tackled by a player who has gone through male puberty, are at a significantly greater risk of injury. The working group calculated that increased injury risk for typical players with female characteristics when tackled by a typical player with male characteristics was between 20 and 30%, and potentially reaching "levels twice as large" in extreme cases where the players are unusually small and large, respectively. Consequently, the document proposes that in the absence of persuasive evidence to the contrary, International Olympic Committee (IOC) guidelines regarding a minimum 12-month lowering of testosterone are "not fit for purpose" in the context of rugby. Anne Lieberman, a director of Athlete Ally, criticized this decision, saying that there were "no examples of transgender women causing serious injuries to cisgender women".

A 2026 meta-analysis published in the British Journal of Sports Medicine found that transgender women who had undergone hormone replacement therapy for at least 1-3 years have higher average levels of lean body mass but comparable levels of physical fitness to cisgender women. The review concluded that existing evidence does not support the hypothesis that transgender women have inherent athletic advantages over cisgender women, and does not justify blanket bans of transgender people from sports; the authors called for further research into the physiological trajectories of transgender athletes.

== Sports governing bodies' policies on transgender inclusion ==
=== Olympics ===
In 2003, a committee convened by the International Olympic Committee (IOC) Medical Commission drew up new guidelines for participating athletes who had undergone gender reassignment. The report listed three conditions for participation. First, athletes must have undergone sex reassignment surgery, including changes in the external genitalia and gonadectomy. Second, athletes must show legal recognition of their gender. Third, athletes must have undergone hormone therapy for an appropriate time before participation, with two years being the suggested time.

It was not until 2004 that the IOC allowed transgender athletes to participate in the Olympic Games.

In 2015, the IOC modified these guidelines in recognition that legal recognition of gender could be difficult in countries where gender transition is not legal, and that requiring surgery in otherwise healthy individuals "may be inconsistent with developing legislation and notions of human rights". The new guidelines require only that trans woman athletes declare their gender and not change that assertion for four years, as well as demonstrate a testosterone level of less than 10 nanomoles per liter for at least one year prior to competition and throughout the period of eligibility. Athletes who transitioned from female to male were allowed to compete without restriction. These guidelines were in effect for the 2016 Rio Olympics, although no openly transgender athletes competed.

In 2021, the IOC approved Laurel Hubbard, a trans woman, to compete in the 2020 Summer Olympics in weightlifting. Hubbard became the first out trans woman to compete at the Olympics; she did not complete her lifts and won no medals. Katelyn Burns, an MSNBC Opinion Columnist, suggested Hubbard's performance demonstrates that transgender athletes do not always win. Hubbard competed with the support of her fellow Olympian competitors. Australian weightlifter Charisma Amoe-Tarrant said "I have so much respect for her and wish her and the other lifters the best and hope we can all come together and enjoy the Olympics, because this Olympics right now is quite different compared to others. I've competed with her previously and always had good chats with her, I just wish her well."

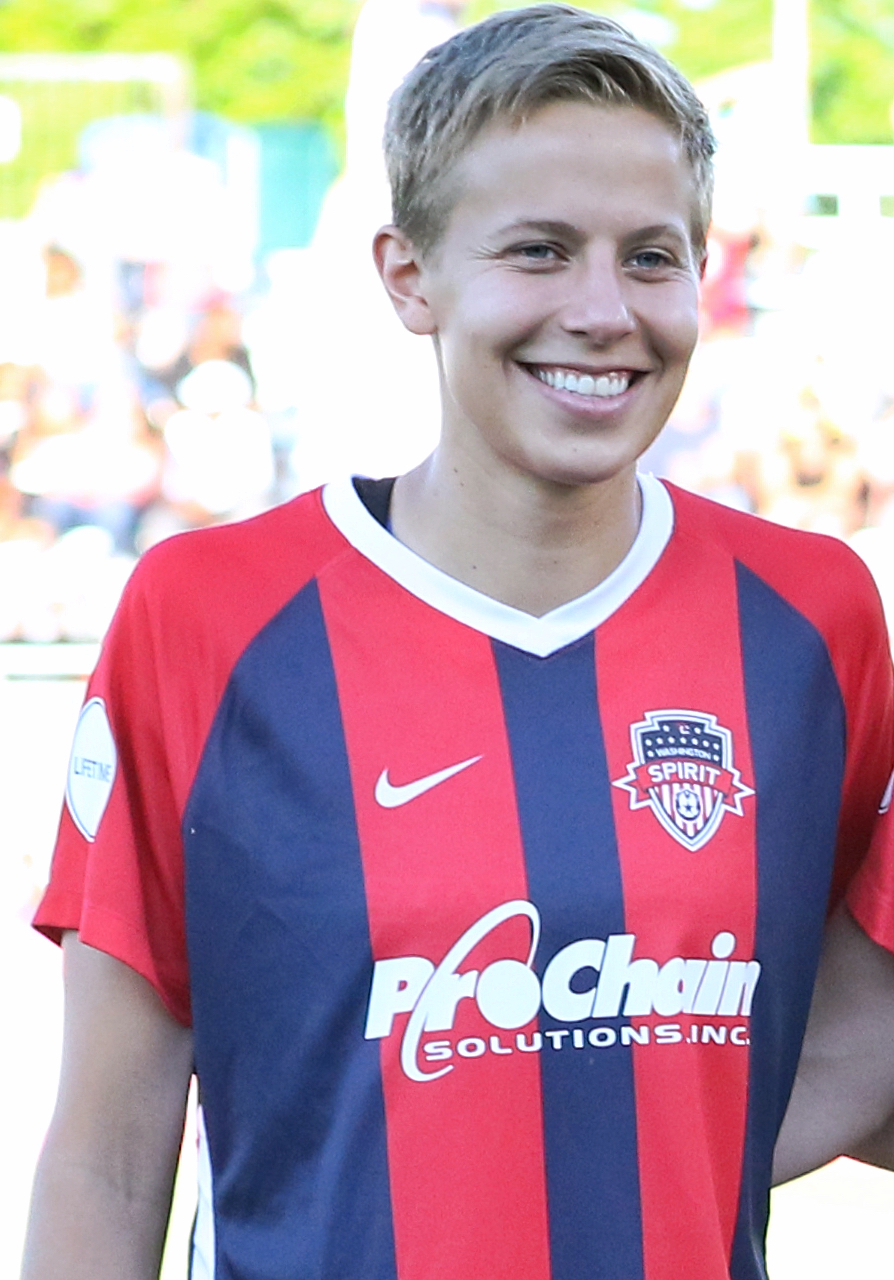
In 2021, non-binary Canadian football player Quinn was one of the first transgender athletes in the Olympics and the first to medal and win a gold medal

On 21 July 2021, at the same Games, Canadian soccer player Quinn became the first non-binary transgender person to compete and to win a medal competing at the Olympics, playing for the Canadian women's soccer team. At the 2020 Summer Olympics, they became the first out, transgender Olympian to medal and win a gold medal. Alana Smith, a non-binary skateboarder, represented the United States in the women's skateboarding semi-finals of the 2020 Summer Olympics.

In November 2021 the IOC issued a non-legally binding framework that focuses on ten principles of inclusion: "prevention of harm, non-discrimination, fairness, no presumption of advantage, evidence-based approach, primacy of health and bodily autonomy, stakeholder-centered approach, right to privacy and periodic reviews". The new guidelines have been described as loosening rules that impede transgender and intersex athlete's participation in Olympic sports, with enforcement of sport-specific rules governing inclusion.

On February 18, 2022, Timothy LeDuc became the first openly non-binary athlete to compete in a Winter Olympics in Beijing. They competed in pairs figure skating alongside their skating partner Ashley Cain-Gribble for Team USA.

In March 2026, the IOC banned trans women and intersex athletes from competing in female events at the 2028 Summer Olympics and future Olympic Games with all potential Olympic athletes requiring to undergo a one-time SRY screening before being permitted to compete in the female category. IOC president Kirsty Coventry stated that the new policy was "based on science" and was made because "it is absolutely clear that it would not be fair for biological males to compete in the female category".

Several days before the official IOC announcement, over 100 human rights and other groups issued a joint statement in which they criticized the proposed rule change as "a blunt and discriminatory response that is not supported by science and violates international human rights law".

=== World Athletics ===
Starting from 31 March 2023, all male-to-female transgender athletes who have been through male puberty were excluded from female World Rankings competitions. Previously in October 2019, World Athletics had allowed trans athletes with a testosterone level limited at 5 nmol/L. According to regulations from October 2019, for a trans woman to compete in the women's category: "3.2.1 she must provide a written and signed declaration, in a form satisfactory to the Medical Manager, that her gender identity is female; 3.2.2 she must demonstrate to the satisfaction of the Expert Panel (on the balance of probabilities), in accordance with clause 4, that the concentration of testosterone in her serum has been less than 5 nmol/L continuously for a period of at least 12 months; and 3.2.3 she must keep her serum testosterone concentration below 5 nmol/L for so long as she wishes to maintain her eligibility to compete in the female category of competition." World Athletics also has rules for intersex/differences of sex development athletes. Intersex athletes will be subjected to specific rules if they have XY male chromosomes, testes rather than ovaries, have circulating testosterone within the typical male range (7.7 to 29.4 nmol/L), and are androgen-sensitive so that their body makes use of that testosterone. World Athletics requires that any such athlete must reduce their blood testosterone level to 5 nmol/L or lower for a six-month period before becoming eligible for track running events from 400 metres to the mile run in international competition, though World Athletics publicly remains open to extending this to other events based on new scientific study. World Athletics created these rules as a way to ensure fair competition in the women's category.

=== International Swimming Federation ===
In June 2022, the International Swimming Federation (FINA), an organization that administers international aquatic sports competitions, voted to bar all transgender athletes from competing in professional women's swimming, with the exception of athletes who "can establish to FINA's comfortable satisfaction that they have not experienced any part of male puberty beyond Tanner Stage 2 (of puberty) or before age 12, whichever is later". FINA also announced the creation of an "open" category for transgender swimmers to compete in.

=== World Rugby ===
World Rugby, the sport's governing body, released the "World Rugby Transgender Guideline" in 2020. The guideline is based on player safety and performance advantage. National Rugby governing bodies are encouraged to use the guideline with flexibility to set domestic rules. The Guideline operates as a policy in all World Rugby Tournaments.

As of 2022, transgender women are not allowed to participate in World Rugby sanctioned events. World Rugby states that trans women would retain performance advantage and put other athletes at risk of injury. Transgender men, regardless of whether they transitioned pre- or post-puberty, may play men's rugby if they provide confirmation they have the physical ability to ensure they are not putting themselves at unacceptable risk. Transgender men who have begun a sex reassignment process that includes supplementing with testosterone may not play women's rugby.

=== World Boxing Council ===
In an exclusive interview with The Telegraph, World Boxing Council President Mauricio Sulaiman said that the WBC would ban trans fighters from competing against cis fighters, and would instead introduce a separate trans category of competition wherein athletes would be divided by their gender assigned at birth. Sulaiman called for current fighters who may be trans to come forward and register accordingly.

=== International Sport Fishing Confederation ===
In 2023, the International Sport Fishing Confederation (Confédération Internationale de la Pêche Sportive) enacted a ban on trans women from competing in the women's competition category, citing a perceived physical advantage at fishing. This decision was criticised by some as discriminatory, while gender critical advocates hailed it as a victory for future generations.

=== International Chess Federation ===
In August 2023, the International Chess Federation, or FIDE, implemented a ban on trans women from playing chess in official FIDE women's tournaments as well as tournaments providing qualification spots to the Women's Chess World Cup. Additionally, they implemented rules stripping trans men of any women's titles they might have earned while competing as women.

=== Ladies Professional Golf Association, United States Golf Association ===
In December 2024, the Ladies Professional Golf Association (LPGA) and the United States Golf Association (USGA) published new policies that state to compete as female in their tournaments, players must either be assigned female at birth, or have transitioned to female before undergoing male puberty. The policies go into effect in 2025.

=== World Professional Billiards and Snooker Association ===
In April 2026, the World Professional Billiards and Snooker Association (WPBSA) announced a new worldwide eligibility policy, which states that "only biological female players may compete in women's tournaments governed by the WPBSA".

== National approaches to transgender inclusion ==
=== Canada ===
Canadian sport organizations must comply with the Canadian Human Rights Act, which includes gender identity and expression as a prohibited ground for discrimination.

In 2016, the Canadian Centre for Ethics in Sport (CCES) published guidance on Trans inclusion and participation in response to requests for information from various national and regional sports administration bodies. The guidance sets out that, until international rules apply, athletes should be able to participate in the gender with which they identify without being subject to any requirements that are different from those of cisgender athletes, unless there is a specific and legitimate reason for the requirement.

As an athlete moves into competitions governed by international rules, the athlete will decide whether to compete under the applicable international rules. Canadian sport organizations should not consider the athlete's ultimate decision when selecting athletes to represent Canada in international competitions.

Some sports organizations such as viaSport, Ringette Canada, and Gymnastics Canada have policies which align to the CCES guidance. Rugby Canada responded to World Rugby's guidance by releasing a statement recommitting to the "Rugby Canada TransInclusion Policy", which is aligned to the CCES guidance. Others, like Swimming Canada, have not fully aligned to the CCES guidance. For example, to swim in national selection events, transgender swimmers must provide written proof that they are eligible for international competition from the international swimming federation to Swimming Canada. Canadian Women and Sport, a group advocating for the advancement of women and girls in sport, does not believe the inclusion of transgender women and girls threatens the advancement of women in sport.

In Alberta, the Fairness and Safety in Sport Act restricts both female competitive and amateur teams to those who were assigned female at birth. It has entered into force on September 1, 2025. In December 2025, Skate Canada announced that it would no longer hold major events in Alberta due to the passage of this bill, stating "we are unable to host events in the province while maintaining our national standards for safe and inclusive sport".

Public opinion polling over the last few years indicates most Canadians believe it is unfair for transgender athletes to compete in sports based on their gender identity. A 2021 poll from the Macdonald-Laurier Institute found by a four-to-one margin that Canadians believe transgender athletes' participation in women’s sport is “unfair”. A 2024 Ipsos poll found that only 23% of Canadians support transgender athletes competing based on the gender they identify with rather than the sex they were assigned at birth.

=== United Kingdom ===
Most major sports in the UK ban transgender women from competing in the female category.

Both the Rugby Football League and the Rugby Football Union decided to ban transgender women from playing in women's rugby in 2022 in moves that followed a similar ban by World Rugby in 2020. Both organisations described this as "a precautionary approach".

In July 2022, the British Triathlon, concluding it was a "gender-affected sport" (S19 GRA 2004), issued a blanket policy banning any athletes not assigned female at birth above the age of 12 from competing, instead requiring them to compete in a newly announced "open" category.

UK Athletics announced a ban in March 2023, following a similar ban by World Athletics.

British Cycling banned transgender women from participating in competitive events in the women's category in May 2023 stating, "Research studies indicate that even with the suppression of testosterone, transgender women who transition post-puberty retain a performance advantage,".

British Rowing announced a ban on transgender women competing in the female category from September 2023

The England and Wales Cricket Board announced in May 2025 that only those whose biological sex was female would be able to participate in women's and girls' cricket.

The Football Association's policy, from 1 June 2025, is that transgender women are not allowed to play in women's football in England. The Scottish Football Association's policy, since the start of season 2025/6, is that only biological females are permitted to play in competitive girls' and women's football which it governs.

England Netball policy, from 1 September 2025, is to recognise female netball, male netball and mixed netball as three distinct gender participation categories with the female category exclusively for players born female, irrespective of their gender identity.

=== New Zealand ===
Sport New Zealand and High Performance Sport New Zealand, crown agencies that lead active recreation and sport across New Zealand, are developing guiding principles for the inclusion of transgender participants in community sport. This publication will guide sport and recreation organizations at a national level toward developing a policy within their respective sport codes covering transgender inclusion in community sport, but not elite sport.

New Zealand Rugby is reviewing its own transgender guidelines for grassroots community rugby with Sport New Zealand in consultation with stakeholders. Their stance on elite sport remains consistent with World Rugby's transgender eligibility and participation policy for professional rugby.

=== Australia ===
In June 2019, Sport Australia and the Australian Human Rights Commission published a report together with the Coalition of Major Professional and Participation Sports (COMPPS). The report is targeted to sporting organizations at all levels from community sport to elite sport in the context of promoting an inclusive environment for transgender and gender diverse people in sport across the country. The COMPPS consists of member organisations in Australia including: Australian Football League, Cricket Australia, Football Federation Australia, National Rugby League, Netball Australia, Rugby Australia and Tennis Australia.

Rugby Australia released guidelines which permit transgender participants to play the game on a case-by-case basis for community rugby competitions at the amateur level, but remain aligned with World Rugby's policy for professional rugby.

In August 2019, Cricket Australia released their guidelines for inclusion. The guidelines serve to promote an inclusive environment for gender diverse participants playing community cricket and allows players to participate in the gender with which they identify rather than their sex, without requiring medical examinations.

In terms of grassroots sport clubs, the Australian not-for-profit sporting inclusion program Pride in Sport maintains a directory of independent LGBTQ sporting clubs in Australia. This listing published an extensive number of sports having at least one club within each of the states and territories of the country.

=== United States ===
In November 2025, USA Hockey updated their Participant Eligibility Policy to limit athletes to registering for programs "based on their sex assigned at birth". The change, which was not publicly announced, went into effect on April 1, 2026.

In February 2026, USA Rugby announced that effective February 20, trans women were no longer eligible to compete in the women's division, but "any athlete registered as male" could continue to compete in the men's division.

== Transgender children in sports ==
=== Australia ===
In July 2019, Sport Australia published guidelines on making sport more inclusive for transgender and gender-diverse people.

=== Canada ===
Provincial governing bodies for high school sports have independent policies on the participation of transgender or non-binary athletes on sex-segregated teams. Organizations such as the Alberta Schools' Athletic Association, the Manitoba High Schools Athletics Association and BC School Sports each have policies that allow the participation of transgender student-athletes in accordance with their gender identity.

Transgender or non-binary student-athletes looking to compete in a team consistent with their gender identity in British Columbia must submit an application to the BC School Sports Executive Director, and are required to have a written statement from both the student-athlete and the principal of their high school confirming their gender identity.

=== United States ===
Map of state laws banning transgender athletes from competing under their gender identity, as of September 2022: Laws ban trans athletes from participating in sports based on gender identity; enforcing gender classification by registered biological sex Laws banning trans athletes from participating in sport under their gender identity are enacted, but currently blocked from enforcement via court order

There are no rules federally to regulate inclusion of transgender children. States vary widely on participation of transgender children in sports and which locker room those students should use. Many states have tried to mimic the NCAA and IOC rules that rely on testosterone level tests to determine when a trans woman can participate in women's sports competitions. These kinds of rules are more difficult to enforce in secondary education because of the lack of resources to test testosterone levels, and medical professionals are often hesitant to prescribe minors hormones.

An anti-LGBT movement in the United States emerging in the early 2020s has advocated against allowing transgender children to play in sports under their gender identity. 26 U.S. States have banned transgender people from sports under their gender identity in various capacities. These states include Texas, Arkansas, Florida, Alabama, Oklahoma, Kentucky, Mississippi, Tennessee, West Virginia, South Carolina, Utah, South Dakota, Montana, Iowa, Arizona, Idaho, Wyoming, Indiana, Louisiana, Kansas, Georgia, North Dakota, New Hampshire, North Carolina, Alaska and Ohio. The passage of legislation against transgender youth has seen increases in calls to Trans Lifeline, a suicide crisis hotline run by and for transgender people. Some of these bans only apply to school sports and some only apply to transgender women, but not transgender men. Under the Biden presidency, the US Department of Education had said transgender students were protected under Title IX but this was rescinded under the Trump presidency.

In November 2026, voters in Arizona, Colorado, Nebraska, and Washington approved ballot measures restricting transgender students' participation in girls' and women's school sports.

- In Indiana, schools rely on anatomical sex, requiring gender reassignment surgery for trans athletes to compete as their identified gender.
- Nebraska formed a Gender Identity Eligibility Committee that decides on a case-by-case basis.
- Texas, Alabama, North Carolina, Kentucky, Idaho, and Florida require trans athletes to compete based on sex assigned at birth.
- In Alaska, Connecticut, Georgia, Kansas, Pennsylvania, and Wisconsin, each school district makes their own decision on how to include trans athletes.
- Maine gives approval for students to choose which team they wish to play on, based on safety and fairness.
- New Jersey and New Mexico require that trans athletes provide evidence that they have transitioned or are transitioning.
- Missouri and Ohio require athletes to undergo hormone treatment. Ohio requires treatment for at least a year prior to competing.
- Oregon allows trans boys and men to participate on male teams. Trans girls and women must be on estrogen replacement therapy for at least a year.
- Iowa allows trans boys and men to participate on male teams, but bans trans girls and women from competing on female teams.
- Oklahoma requires any student participating in sports to submit a notarized affidavit of gender assigned at birth, under penalty of perjury.

==== Little v. Hecox ====
Oral argument was held before the United States Supreme Court on January 13, 2026. On June 30, 2026, in the consolidated case Little v. Hecox, decided together with West Virginia v. B. P. J., the Supreme Court upheld Idaho's law, holding that it does not violate the Equal Protection Clause or Title IX.

In March 2020, Idaho Governor Brad Little signed into law the "Fairness in Women's Sports Act", also known as House Bill 500. This legislation, the first of its kind in the United States, prohibits transgender athletes from competing in sports against athletes of the other biological sex. In April 2020, the ACLU and the Legal Voice filed a lawsuit, Hecox v. Little, arguing that this law violates the US Constitution and Title IX. On August 17, 2020, the United States District Court for the District of Idaho issued a preliminary injunction against the law pending trial, issuing an opinion that the plaintiffs were "likely to succeed in establishing [that] the Act is unconstitutional as currently written". On August 17, 2023, the Ninth Circuit Court of Appeals upheld this injunction. On July 3, 2025, the U.S. Supreme Court granted Idaho's petition and agreed to hear the case. In October 2025, a district judge denied Hecox's request to dismiss the case, with oral hearings scheduled for 13 January 2026.

==== Soule v. Connecticut Association of Schools ====
After women's high school competitions were won by transgender student Andraya Yearwood in Connecticut, a lawsuit was filed against the Connecticut Association of Schools-Connecticut Interscholastic Athletic Conference (CIAC) and several school boards in federal court to try to stop the participation of transgender athletes. The lawsuit was dismissed in April 2021 by the district court as moot, because Yearwood and Miller had graduated and the plaintiffs would not likely have to compete with transgender athletes in the next season.

In October 2021, women's sports icons Billie Jean King, World Cup Champion and United States women's national soccer team Co-Captain Megan Rapinoe, WNBA stars Brianna Turner, Layshia Clarendon, and over 150 athletes in women's sports spoke out in support of transgender athletes and filed an amicus brief in an appeal of the Soule v. CIAC trial court dismissal, along with the Women's National Basketball Players Association (WNBPA), Athlete Ally, and the Women's Sports Foundation, in support of CIAC and affirming the dismissal.

On December 16, 2022, a three-judge panel of the Second Circuit Appeals Court ruled against the plaintiffs, citing the 2020 decision Bostock v. Clayton County, in which the Supreme Court ruled discrimination against transgender employees violated Title VII of the Civil Rights Act of 1964.

==== West Virginia v. B.P.J. ====
B.P.J, a 12-year-old transgender girl, filed a lawsuit in February 2021, challenging West Virginia's "Save Women's Sports Act." The law bans transgender girls from participating in school sports programs. In April 2024, the Fourth Circuit Court of Appeals ruled that West Virginia's law was unconstitutional. In July 2025, the U.S. Supreme Court agreed to hear the case. In July 2025, the U.S. Supreme Court agreed to hear the case, together with Little v. Hecox. On June 30, 2026, the Supreme Court reversed the Fourth Circuit and upheld West Virginia's law, holding that it does not violate the Equal Protection Clause or Title IX.

==== D.N. v. DeSantis ====
On June 1, 2021, Florida Governor DeSantis signed into law the "Fairness in Women's Sports Act" (SB 1028), which banned transgender athletes in public secondary schools and colleges from playing on girls' or women's sports teams. On June 29, 2021, D.N., born male but identified as female, then 13 years old, filed a complaint with the United States District Court for the Southern District of Florida, challenging the law. According to the complaint, D.N. played soccer on the girls' team at middle school and sought to play on the girls' high school team. On November 6, 2023, the court upheld the Florida law. The court held that the law does not violate the Equal Protection Clause of the U.S. Constitution and rejected D.N.'s claim that the law violates Title IX, which bars discrimination based on sex in educational programs that receive federal funds. The court cited Adams v. School Board of St. Johns County, a 2022 decision by the U.S. Court of Appeals for the Eleventh Circuit that upheld Florida's transgender bathroom bill and ruled that Title IX's reference to "sex" does not include "gender identity." The court granted D.N. leave to file an amended complaint.

==== Roe v. Utah High School Activities Association ====
In May 2022, the families of two transgender girls filed a lawsuit against the Utah High School Activities Association over the Utah House Bill 11. The law bans transgender girls from participating in girls' high school sports. In August 2022, the Third District Court of Utah granted a preliminary injunction in favor of the families. In October 2025, the families and the Utah High School Activities Association agreed to dismiss the case with prejudice.

==== Biden administration rule change ====
In April 2023, the Biden administration proposed a Title IX rule change which would declare blanket "one size fits all" bans on trans athletes from teams consistent with their genders a violation of Title IX, but would authorize such bans if done for a number of reasons, including "fairness in competition". According to the proposal, this would most likely mean that bans that apply to elementary school students would be forbidden, but bans on high school and college students would be authorized under Title IX.

After two delays, the final changes to Title IX were published in April 2024. The new changes cemented protections for LGBT students under federal law and reversed a number of Trump-era policies that dictated how schools should respond to cases of alleged sexual misconduct in K-12 schools and college campuses. They also effectively broadened the scope of Title IX by extending the law's reach to prohibit discrimination and harassment based on sexual orientation and gender identity, and widen the range of sexual harassment complaints that schools will be responsible for investigating. However, it did not explicitly say schools are forbidden from banning transgender women from competing in women's sports. In response to these new changes, over 20 republican-led states sued the Biden Administration and refused to follow the new rules. In June 2024, a judge temporarily blocked President Biden's proposed changes to the interpretation of Title IX in Texas. A few days later, a judge issued an injunction temporary blocking the rules in Idaho, Louisiana, Mississippi and Montana. The week after that, a judge temporarily blocked the law in Tennessee, Kentucky, Ohio, Indiana, Virginia and West Virginia. On July 2, 2024, a federal judge temporarily blocked the law in Kansas, Alaska, Utah and Wyoming. This ruling also blocks the rule from taking effect in schools in Stillwater, Oklahoma, the home of a middle school student who joined the lawsuit, as well as any schools attended by members of the Young America's Foundation and the children of members of Moms for Liberty — two national conservative groups that signed onto the lawsuit. On July 17, 2024, the Fifth and Sixth Circuits upheld two of the blocks. On July 26, 2024, a federal court temporarily blocked the rule from taking effect in Iowa, Arkansas, Missouri, Nebraska, North Dakota and South Dakota. On August 1, 2024, the rule went into effect in all the states that had blocked them.

On August 16, 2024, the Supreme Court, in a 5–4 ruling, denied an emergency request from the Biden Administration to reinstate the law while further legal battles play out in the lower court. The ruling did not address the merits of the lawsuits or whether the new rules were constitutional.

On January 9, 2025, U.S. District court judge Danny C. Reeves struck down the Biden administration's expanded protections nationwide in response to the lawsuit filed by the states of Tennessee, Kentucky, Indiana, Ohio, Virginia, and West Virginia.

==== Second Trump administration executive order ====
On February 5, 2025, Donald Trump signed an executive order titled "Keeping Men Out of Women's Sports", which directs federal agencies and state attorneys general to immediately enforce a prohibition of transgender girls and women from participating in women's sports.

==== United States v. California Interscholastic Federation ====
On July 9, 2025, the Trump administration sued the state of California for allowing trans girls to compete in girls' school sports, claiming that this policy violates Title IX protections. The lawsuit was filed after the California Department of Education and the California Interscholastic Federation refused to comply with a federal directive to change their policies of including trans athletes and to issue apologies to athletes who lost to trans female competitors.

On August 31, 2026, district court judge Cynthia Valenzuela Dixon dismissed the lawsuit, ruling that the federal government did not notify the state that they would lose federal funding unless they banned trans girls from school sports.

==== J. Doe vs State of Washington ====
On November 9, 2026, parents of student athletes, along with the advocacy group TransFamilies and the Washington Education Association teachers' union, filed a lawsuit against the state of Washington. The plaintiffs seek to block the recently-passed ballot Initiative 638, which requires girls to provide medical documentation of "reproductive anatomy" if they wish to join women's sports teams.

== In post-secondary education ==
=== Canada ===
In September 2018, U Sports, the governing body of intercollegiate and varsity athletics in Canada, released a policy addressing eligibility and best practices for the inclusion of transgender student-athletes at their member institutions. Under this new policy, U Sports student-athletes are able to compete according to their gender identity or sex assigned at birth provided they meet requirements of the Canadian Anti-Doping Program. Transgender student-athletes, like other U Sports athletes, are given five years of eligibility to compete and may only represent one gender of sports team per school year.

=== New Zealand ===
University and Tertiary Sport New Zealand (UTSNZ) has its own inclusion policy covering transgender and gender diverse athletes in sport. The policy allows transgender athletes to compete in the sport category that aligns to their gender identity. Transgender women are permitted to compete in a men's UTSNZ competition. If a transgender woman has undergone testosterone suppression for 12 months, she may also compete in women's competitions. Similarly, transgender males are eligible to participate in either men's or women's competition (but not both categories within one season), provided they are not undergoing hormone treatment for gender transition. For transgender men who have taken hormone treatment with testosterone related to gender transition, they may no longer participate in women's competitions but can still compete in men's competition.

=== United Kingdom ===
Under the Equality Act 2010, discrimination based on sex or gender reassignment is illegal unless a proportional means of achieving a legitimate aim such as safety or fair competition, and current Equality and Human Rights Commission guidance makes clear that “Any sex-based rules or arrangements relating to participation in a gender-affected activity should be applied on the basis of biological sex. Therefore, trans people should not be included in single-sex or separate-sex competitions for the sex with which they identify.”

=== United States ===
In August 2011, the National Collegiate Athletic Association Office of Inclusion published the NCAA Inclusion of Transgender Student-Athletes resource outlining their best practices and policies for the inclusion for transgender student-athletes. This policy had permitted transgender athletes who were not using hormone therapy to continue to participate on the team that corresponded to their assigned sex at birth. A trans man student-athlete could have participated on either a men's or women's team, unless receiving testosterone, in which case he could only compete on a men's team; athletes receiving doses of testosterone as a part of their transition had to apply for a medical exemption through the league, as testosterone was, and remains a banned substance in the NCAA. A trans woman student-athlete was not permitted to compete on a women's team until after one year of testosterone suppression treatment. Ongoing monitoring of treatment and written documentation is required for student-athletes undergoing testosterone suppression.

In December 2024, Texas Attorney General Ken Paxton sued the NCAA, arguing that allowing trans women to compete in women's sporting events was "false, deceptive, and misleading" to attendees.

On February 5, 2025, Donald Trump signed an executive order titled "Keeping Men Out of Women's Sports", which directs federal agencies and state attorneys general to immediately enforce a prohibition of transgender girls and women from participating in women's sports.

On February 6, 2025, the NCAA changed its policy to limit college competitions in women's sports to athletes who were assigned female at birth, effective immediately.

== Public opinion ==
=== Australia ===
Ipsos reported in 2025 that only 21% in Australia were in favour of trans athletes competing based on their gender identify rather than their sex as assigned at birth.

In 2021, a poll conducted by Binary Australia, an organisation that opposes trans women competing in women's sports, found that 67.3% of Australians opposed allowing trans women to compete against cis women. The poll found that only a majority of Greens voters (52.1%) were in favour, while the majority of people who vote for Labor (62.9%), the Liberals (78.3%), the Nationals (79.4%) and One Nation (81.1%) were against.

=== Canada ===
Ipsos found in 2025 that just 23% of Canadians support transgender athletes competing in sports based on the gender they identify with rather than their sex as assigned at birth.

In a 2021 poll in Canada, 62% of Canadians found it "unfair" to allow transgender athletes to participate in women's sports, while 15% found it "fair".

=== United States ===
A 2021 Gallup poll showed that 62% of Americans opposed people playing on teams that matched their gender identity rather than their birth sex. A 2023 Gallup poll found that this percentage had increased to 69%.

A 2021 PBS/NPR/Marist poll found 67% of Americans, including 66% of Republicans, opposed legislation that would prohibit transgender student athletes from joining sports teams that match their gender identity.

A 2022 Washington Post poll found that 58% of Americans were against allowing transgender women to compete with other women in college and professional sports.

A 2024 poll by GLAAD found that more than half of both registered and likely voters surveyed said they would not support a candidate who "speaks frequently about restricting access to health care and participation in sports for transgender youth."

In January 2025, a New York Times/Ipsos poll showed that 79% of respondents supported a ban on transgender athletes from women's sports.

== See also ==
- Gay Games
- List of LGBT sportspeople
- Mixed-sex sports
