= Lia Thomas =

American swimmer (born 1999)

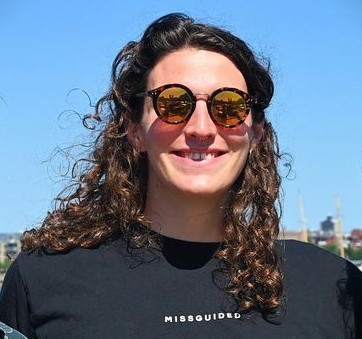
- Thomas in 2022
- Born: May 1999 (age 27)
- Education: University of Pennsylvania (BA)
- Known for: First openly transgender athlete to win an NCAA Division I national championship
- Sports career
- Height: 6 ft 1 in (185 cm)
- Sport: Swimming
- Strokes: Freestyle; Distance
- College team: University of Pennsylvania

Lia Catherine Thomas (born May 1999) is an American swimmer and the first openly transgender athlete to win an NCAA Division I national championship, having won the women's 500-yard freestyle event in 2022, before being barred from competing in women's events by World Aquatics. Thomas's career has been a part of the public debate about transgender women in women's sports.

In July 2025, after the second Trump administration had previously cut the University of Pennsylvania's federal funding in March 2025, UPenn agreed to issue a public statement and update university swimming records based on the Trump administration's changed interpretation of Title IX, while still crediting Thomas with having set certain school records in the 2021–2022 season in accordance with the eligibility guidelines at the time.

== Early life and education ==
Thomas was born in May 1999 and grew up in Austin, Texas. She has an older brother. Thomas began swimming at the age of five, and was sixth in the state high school swimming championships for boys' events while competing for Westlake High School. In 2017, she enrolled at the University of Pennsylvania, graduating in 2022 with plans to attend law school. Thomas began to question her gender identity toward the end of high school, and came out as transgender to her family during the summer of 2018 after her freshman year at Penn.

== Swimming career ==
Thomas began swimming on the men's team at the University of Pennsylvania in 2017. During her freshman year, Thomas recorded a time of eight minutes and 57.55 seconds in the 1,000-yard freestyle that ranked as the sixth-fastest national men's time, and also recorded 500-yard freestyle and 1,650-yard freestyle times that ranked within the national top 100. On the men's swim team in 2018–2019, Thomas finished second in the men's 500, 1,000, and 1,650-yard freestyle at the Ivy League championships as a sophomore in 2019. During the 2018–2019 season, Thomas recorded the top UPenn men's team times in the 500 free, 1,000 free, and 1,650 free, but was the sixth best among UPenn men's team members in the 200 free.

Thomas began transitioning using hormone replacement therapy in May 2019, and came out as a trans woman during her junior year to her coaches, friends, and the women's and men's swim teams at the University of Pennsylvania. She was required to swim for the men's team in the 2019–2020 academic year as a junior while undergoing hormone therapy and then swam on the women's team in 2021–2022 after taking a year off school to maintain her eligibility to compete while competitive swimming was canceled due to the COVID-19 pandemic. By 2021, she had met the NCAA hormone therapy requirements to swim on the women's team.

Thomas lost muscle mass and strength through testosterone suppression and hormone replacement therapy. Her time for the 500 freestyle is over 15 seconds slower than her personal bests before medically transitioning. Thomas's event progression peaked in 2019 for distance swimming, with a drop in times during the 2021–2022 season. Her event progression for sprint swimming reflected a dip at the start of 2021–2022 season before returning to near-lifetime bests in the 100 free and a lifetime personal best in the 50 free in 2021. In the 2018–2019 season, when competing in the men's team, Thomas was ranked 554th in the 200 freestyle, 65th in the 500 freestyle, and 32nd in the 1650 freestyle, though these rankings have been called into question because they were based on an event that was not a full championship competition and Thomas did not reduce her training before the race to perform at her best. In the 2021–2022 season, those ranks when competing in the women's team were fifth in the 200 freestyle, first in the 500 freestyle, and eighth in the 1,650 freestyle. According to an archived page of the swimming data website Swimcloud, Thomas was ranked 89th among male college swimmers for that season. In a race during January 2022 at a meet against UPenn's Ivy League rival Yale, Thomas finished in 6th place in the 100m freestyle race, losing to four cisgender women and Iszac Henig, a transgender man, who transitioned without hormone therapy.

In March 2022, Thomas became the first openly transgender athlete to win an NCAA Division I national championship in any sport after winning the women's 500-yard freestyle with a time of 4:33.24; Olympic silver medalist Emma Weyant was second with a time 1.75 seconds behind Thomas. Thomas did not break any records at the NCAA event, while Kate Douglass broke 18 NCAA records. Thomas was 9.18 seconds short of Katie Ledecky's NCAA record of 4:24.06. In the preliminaries for the 200 freestyle, Thomas finished second. In the final for the 200 freestyle, Thomas placed fifth with a time of 1:43.50. In the preliminaries for the 100 freestyle, Thomas finished tenth. In the finals for the 100 freestyle, Thomas placed eighth out of eight competitors in 48.18 seconds, finishing last.

The March 2022 NCAA championship was Thomas's last college swimming event. By the conclusion of Thomas's swimming career at UPenn in 2022, her rank had moved from 65th on the men's team to 1st on the women's team in the 500-yard freestyle, and 554th on the men's team to fifth on the women's team in the 200-yard freestyle. According to the swimming data website Swimcloud, Thomas was ranked 34th among female college swimmers in the United States for the 2021–2022 season, and 54th among women swimmers nationally. In March 2022, Sports Illustrated reported that Thomas applied for law school and planned to swim at the 2024 Summer Olympics trials.

In a May 2022 interview with Good Morning America, Thomas defended herself from criticism, said that "I intend to keep swimming. It's been a goal of mine to swim at Olympic trials for a very long time, and I would love to see that through." In an interview with ESPN, Thomas said that "It has been incredibly rewarding and meaningful to be able to be authentic and to be myself". In June 2022, the International Swimming Federation (FINA), an organization that administers international aquatic sports competitions, voted to bar all transgender athletes from competing in professional women's swimming, with the exception of athletes who "can establish to FINA's comfortable satisfaction that they have not experienced any part of male puberty beyond Tanner Stage 2 (of puberty) or before age 12, whichever is later". This action prevented Thomas from competing in the women's competition at the 2024 United States Olympic trials as she had planned. In response to the decision, Thomas said: "The new FINA release is deeply upsetting. It is discriminatory and will only serve to harm all women."

== Media and political attention ==
In 2021, conservative media, including Fox News, began widely covering Thomas. In early December, anonymous parents of University of Pennsylvania swim team members wrote to the NCAA, seeking for Thomas to be declared ineligible to compete. In December 2021, USA Swimming official Cynthia Millen resigned after 30 years in protest against Thomas's eligibility to compete and then she appeared to express her views on the Fox News show The Ingraham Angle. In a January 10, 2022, article, The Washington Post wrote, "Thomas has shattered school records and has posted the fastest times of any female college swimmer in two events this season. She'll probably be a favorite at the NCAA championships in March, even as people inside and outside the sport debate her place on the pool deck."

In January 2022, the University of Pennsylvania, multiple organizations affiliated with the University of Pennsylvania Law School, and the Ivy League issued statements supporting Thomas. In February 2022, in response to a proposed NCAA transgender athlete policy that could prevent Thomas from competing in the NCAA championships, sixteen anonymous members of the University of Pennsylvania women's swimming team sent a letter to the university and Ivy League officials asking them not to take legal action against the proposal. They said that Thomas's rank "bounced from #462 as a male to #1 as a female". (Note: According to the swimming data website Swimcloud, Thomas is ranked 36th among female college swimmers in the United States for the 2021–2022 season, and 46th among women swimmers nationally. By the conclusion of Thomas's swimming career at UPenn in 2022, her rank had moved from 65th on the men's team to 1st on the women's team in the 500-yard freestyle, and 554th on the men's team to 5th on the women's team in the 200-yard freestyle.) Another group of swimmers from Thomas's swim team made a separate statement supporting her competing on the women's team. The anonymous letter also led to another letter in response, organized by Schuyler Bailar and signed by more than 300 current and former collegiate swimmers, stating their "support for Lia Thomas, and all transgender college athletes, who deserve to be able to participate in safe and welcoming athletic environments".

Brooke Forde, an Olympic silver medalist, said of Thomas that "I believe that treating people with respect and dignity is more important than any trophy or record will ever be, which is why I will not have a problem racing against Lia at NCAAs this year". Another swimmer, Olympic silver medalist Erica Sullivan, spoke in support of Thomas in an opinion piece for Newsweek: "like anyone else in this sport, Lia has trained diligently to get to where she is and has followed all of the rules and guidelines put before her ... she doesn't win every time. And when she does, she deserves, like anyone else in this sport, to be celebrated for her hard-won success, not labeled a cheater simply because of her identity." 23-time Olympic gold medalist Michael Phelps said that "I believe that we all should feel comfortable with who we are in our own skin, but I think sports should all be played on an even playing field" and "I don't know what that looks like in the future". Three-time Olympic gold medalist Nancy Hogshead-Makar opposed Thomas's participation, arguing that she had not "demonstrated that [she] lost her sex-linked, male-puberty advantage prior to competition in the women's category".

In February 2022, Vicky Hartzler, a Republican Senate candidate in Missouri, featured Thomas in a campaign advertisement asserting that "Women's sports are for women, not men pretending to be women", which was described by Eric Levenson, a senior writer for CNN Digital, as "a transphobic trope belittling trans women". In March, roughly 50 protesters and counter-protesters gathered outside the Georgia Tech Aquatic Center when Thomas swam in the NCAA Division I national championship. Some in the stands carried banners saying "Save Women's Sports". On day 2 of the championships, around 10 protesters from the group "Save Women's Sports" protested during the preliminaries of the women's 500-yard freestyle. Reka Gyorgy finished in 17th place in the 500-yard freestyle event which Thomas won, one place short of qualifying for finals, and complained to the NCAA. On March 22, Florida governor Ron DeSantis issued a proclamation declaring second-place finisher Emma Weyant the "rightful winner" of the 2022 NCAA Division I Women's 500-yard Freestyle, although he does not have the authority to select the winner of the NCAA championship. In March, Colorado representative Lauren Boebert introduced a bill co-sponsored by 20 other Republicans that honors Weyant. Transgender former athlete Caitlyn Jenner said that Thomas was not the "rightful winner", adding "It's not transphobic or anti-trans, it's common sense!", while social media users responded by pointing out Jenner has previously expressed support for transgender athletes and has competed in women's golf.

In February 2022, CNN's Levinson described Thomas as "the face of the debate on transgender women in sports". In March 2022, Sports Illustrated denoted her as "the most controversial athlete in America". On March 23, after Indiana governor Eric Holcomb vetoed a legislative ban on the participation of transgender girls in school sports for girls, The New York Times wrote, "Sports participation by transgender girls and women has become an increasingly divisive topic among political leaders and sports sanctioning groups, which have struggled with the issue in a way that respects transgender athletes and addresses concerns some critics have raised about competitive fairness", and reported that Utah governor Spencer Cox at a press conference before his veto of similar legislation stated to the transgender community, "We care about you. We love you. It's going to be OK. We're going to get through this together."

In a report about the issue of gender identity being raised during the spring 2022 confirmation hearing for U.S. Supreme Court nominee Ketanji Brown Jackson, The New York Times wrote that after the vetoes by Holcomb and Cox, as well as the win by Thomas at the NCAA championship, "Transgender rights are dominating outrage on the right". On March 31, The Hill described the debate over the participation of transgender athletes in sports as "the latest flashpoint in the country's culture wars" and wrote "Lia Thomas became the latest transgender athlete caught in the debate's crosshairs" after her NCAA win. The National Women's Law Center, a non-profit organization, defended Thomas, saying that she "deserves all the celebration for her success this season, but instead is being met with nationwide misogyny and transphobia". The American Civil Liberties Union (ACLU) also defended Thomas, saying that "It's not a women's sport if it doesn't include ALL women athletes" and that "Lia Thomas belongs on the Penn swimming and diving team".

In March 2025, Donald Trump's administration withheld $175 million of federal funding from UPenn for allowing Thomas to swim as a woman, accounting for 17.5% of the university's total federal funding. In July, UPenn agreed to release a public statement affirming their compliance with the Trump administration's new interpretation of Title IX, as a result of Executive Order 14168 and Executive Order 14201, limiting participation of athletes based on the administration's changed interpretation of sex assigned at birth and updating swimming records set during the season. The university stated,

While Penn's policies during the 2021–2022 swim season were in accordance with NCAA eligibility rules at the time, we acknowledge that some student-athletes were disadvantaged by these rules. We recognize this and will apologize to those who experienced a competitive disadvantage or experienced anxiety because of the policies in effect at the time.

Following the announcement of the agreement, the university updated the swimming records under the current eligibility guidelines and adding an italicized footnote to the bottom of their records pages, stating: "Competing under eligibility rules in effect at the time, Lia Thomas set program records in the 100, 200 and 500 freestyle during the 2021–22 season." Following the agreement reached between the Department of Education and the university, the government released the $175 million of withheld funding.

== Legal challenge ==
In January 2024, Thomas opened a legal challenge to the World Aquatics gender inclusion policy. The policy, introduced in 2022, allows trans women to compete in the women's category as long as any male puberty was halted by age 12 or Tanner Stage 2. Thomas's challenge argued that this policy is discriminatory. In June 2024, the Court of Arbitration for Sport ruled that Thomas did not have standing to challenge the policy, meaning she would remain ineligible to compete.

== Swimming records ==
=== Personal bests ===
SCY (Short course)

Event	Time	Venue	Date	Notes
50 FR	22.78	Zippy Invite (W)	December 3, 2021	Penn women's swim team (Note: Competing under eligibility rules in effect at the time.)
100 FR	47.15	College Station (M)	February 4, 2017	Penn men's swim team
200 FR	1:39.31	Tennessee Invitational (M)	November 30, 2018	Penn men's swim team
500 FR	4:18.72	2019 Ivy League Championships (M)	February 28, 2019	Penn men's swim team
1000 FR	8:55.75	2019 Ivy League Championships (M)	March 1, 2019	Penn men's swim team
1650 FR	14:54.76	2019 Ivy League Championships (M)	March 2, 2019	Penn men's swim team
200 IM	1:56.51	UPENN vs WCU Senior Meet	January 27, 2019	Penn men's swim team

=== Penn men's swim team records ===
SCY

Event	Time	Date	Notes
1000 FR	8:57.55	2018	Ivy League Championships
1650 FR	14:59.19	2018	Ivy League Championships
500 FR	4:18.72	2019	Ivy League Championships
1000 FR	8:55.75	2019	Ivy League Championships
1650 FR	14:54.76	2019	Ivy League Championships

=== Penn women's swim team records ===
SCY

Event	Time	Date	Notes
100 FR	47.37	2022	2022 NCAA Division I Women's Championship
200 FR	1:41.93	2021	Zippy Invite
500 FR	4:33.24	2022	2022 NCAA Division I Women's Championship
1000 FR	9:35.96	2021	Zippy Invite
1650 FR	15:59.71	2021	Zippy Invite
400 FR Relay	2:01.41	2022	Thomas, Kaczorowski, Kannan, Carter
800 FR Relay	4:16.14	2022	Thomas, Kaczorowski, Kannan, Carter
