= Frances Anderson (billiardist) =

American billiards player and advocate (1871–1928)

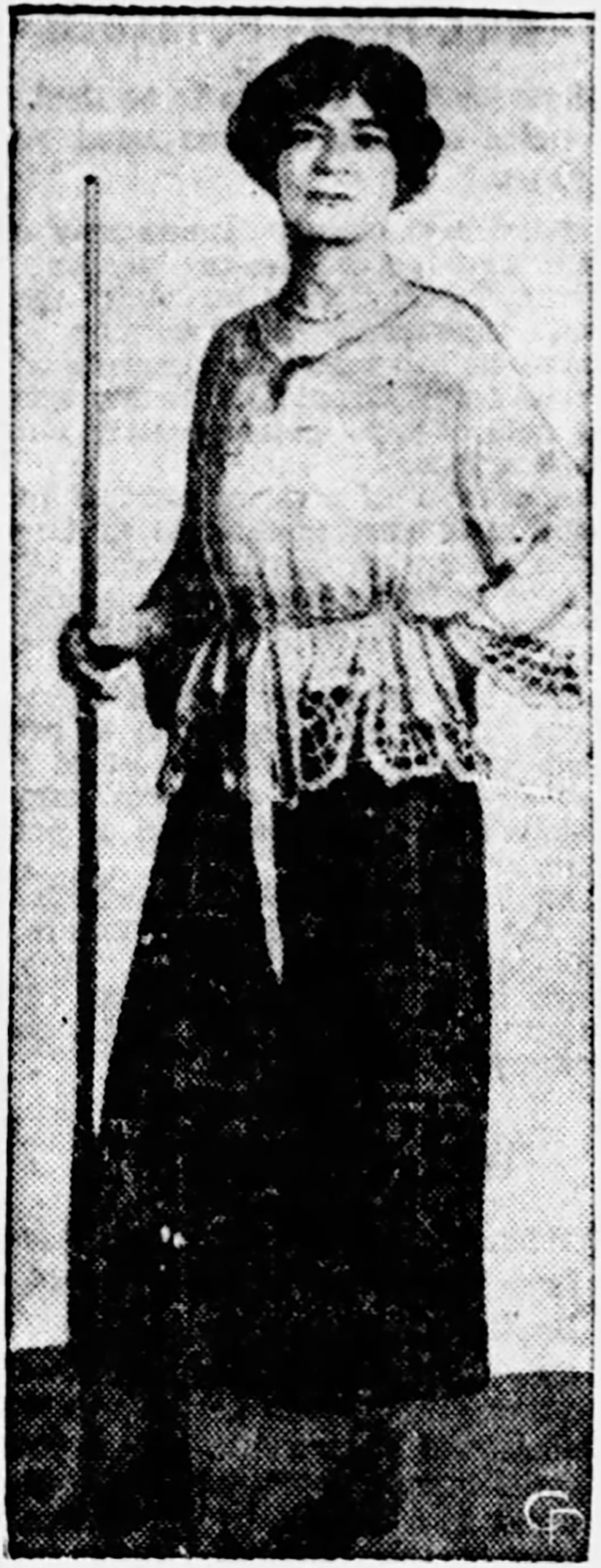
Promotional photo of Anderson, published widely also after her death.

Frances Anderson (1871 - March 29, 1928, Sapulpa) was a billiards player, philanthropist and advocate for women in cue sports. Called “the recognized, undisputed lady [billiards] champion of the world,” her reputation waned when at death she was discovered to have been assigned male at birth, making her one of the first prominent trans women in sports.

== Life ==
=== Before sports career ===
Frances' obsession with billiards started in her childhood in Newton, Kansas, with an argument with her father over the sport being one of the reasons for her frequently running away from her family. She also participated in gun clubs in the 1880s. Her early professional forays included opening a new clothing store as a 16yo, and becoming a journalist in her 20s. In 1893 she was arrested for playing in a rigged card competition. Following a rheumatism diagnosis, Frances became addicted to prescribed morphine and cocaine. She credited her fourth wife married in 1907, a rich Choctaw woman, with saving her from addiction.

=== Sports career ===
Around the turn of the century, a woman named Frances Anderson started offering 5000$ to any player who could defeat her. The idea of a woman in a sport still considered "masculine" already, and also one welcoming women to billiards events, was a novelty. She bought newspaper ads to promote reserved seats just for women, and allowed women to play against her for free. One of the games she played and advertised was "Pocket Corrom" (sic).

Initially, Frances would function as a woman only in her exhibitions, and working the days as a man, presenting full-time as a woman after 1915, when she was already rich from the billiards success. By this point, she publicly presented as a solitary (presumably unmarried) person.

She took another job in 1919, working as a nurse in the Spanish flu outbreak in Richmond, Virginia for three months, before returning to billiards full time.

She was based in Los Angeles, but traveled to all 48 states and throughout Europe. Anderson played against many famous players, with her name becoming associated with the game, and exchanged letters with Willie Hoppe. She frequently donated her earnings to organizations such as Red Cross.

=== Death ===
The life of a traveling billiards player severely strained Frances' health, including eyesight, speech and lungs. In 1928 she checked into a hotel in Sapulpa, Oklahoma, where she committed suicide. She was found with a yellowed letter that said “Bury me as you find me, a woman. Do what you will with my body, but keep my secret.” tucked into her stockings. Her family identified the body with their long presumed missing relative, burying her in a silk dress, while newspapers started maligning her as a man “masquerading” as a woman. This version of the story made it to Ripley's Believe It or Not!.
