= Veronica Ivy =

Philosophy professor, competitive cyclist, transgender rights activist

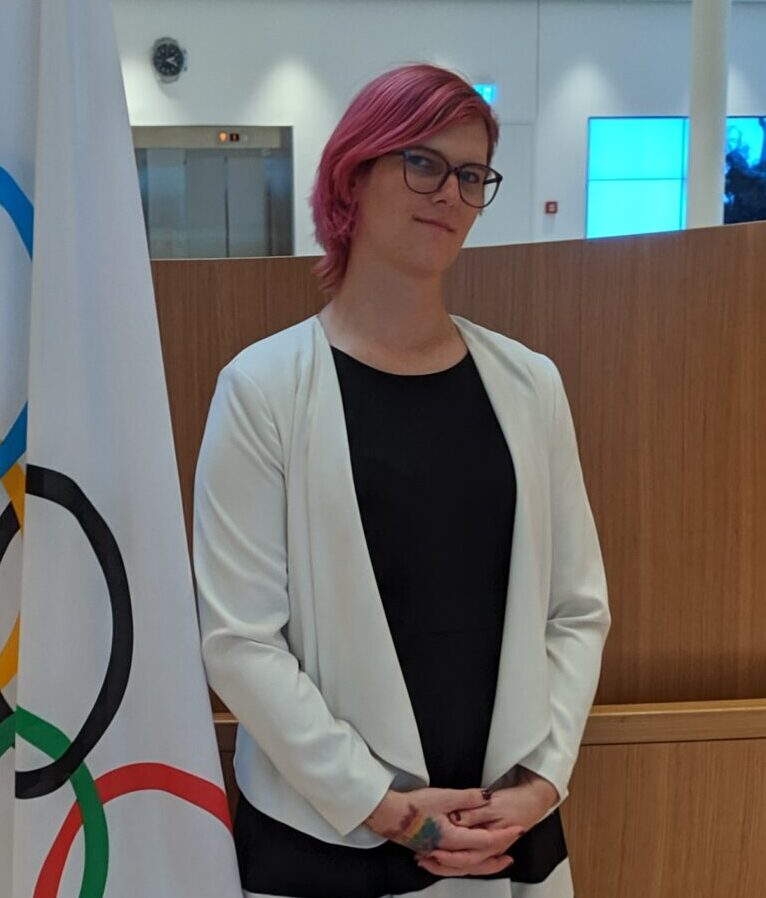
- Ivy at IOC Headquarters in Lausanne, 2019
- Born: 1982 (age 43–44); Victoria, British Columbia, Canada
- Occupations: Cyclist, activist, philosopher

Veronica Ivy (born 1982), formerly Rachel McKinnon, is a Canadian competitive cyclist , golfer, and transgender rights activist. In 2018, she became the first transgender world track cycling champion by placing first at the UCI Women's Masters Track World Championship for the women's 35–44 age bracket.

== Early life and education ==
Ivy is from Victoria, British Columbia. She earned a bachelors of arts degree in philosophy from the University of Victoria (2005) and completed her PhD from University of Waterloo in Philosophy in 2012, with a thesis entitled "Reasonable Assertions: On Norms of Assertion and Why You Don't Need to Know What You're Talking About".

Ivy has said she first began thinking she might be transgender when she was thirteen, but took sixteen more years to "come to terms with it". She started transitioning near the time she was finishing her doctorate, and came out "two days after I defended my dissertation." She wrote to her students to tell them that she was transgender on 2 May 2012.

Ivy was an associate professor of philosophy at the College of Charleston in South Carolina. She earned tenure in March 2019, and became an associate professor in August the same year.

Ivy's primary research focus is the philosophy of language. The majority of her published work is about the norms of the speech act of assertion, pre-eminently her 2015 monograph The Norms of Assertion: Truth, Lies, and Warrant (Palgrave Macmillan, ISBN 978-1-137-52172-9). Another focus of her work is feminism and feminist philosophy, particularly issues relating to gender and queer identities.

== Media career ==
Ivy has written articles on transgender and intersex issues for outlets including NBC News, Vice, and Newsweek.

== Athletic career ==
Prior to moving to the College of Charleston, Ivy played badminton. Lacking a strong badminton scene at Charleston, Ivy developed an interest in sport cycling. On 12 October 2018, she won the world 200-meter sprint record for women in the 35–39 age range, and the next day won the UCI Masters World Track Cycling Championship in the Women's Sprint 35–44 age bracket, becoming the first transgender world champion in track cycling.

Some in the sports world expressed their belief that her birth sex gave her an unfair advantage. American cyclist Jennifer Wagner, who finished third (bronze), said Ivy's birth sex gave her physiological advantages. The second-place (silver-medal) winner, Dutch athlete Caroline van Herrikhuyzen, supported Ivy. Ivy argued that there was no evidence that being born male gave an advantage in the race and that she had lost to Wagner in the past. British columnist Katie Hopkins wrote that the decision to allow Ivy to compete was evidence that "the world is gripped by a febrile madness". Tennis player Martina Navratilova said that allowing people born male to compete in women's sports was "insane" and "cheating". Ivy criticized Navrátilová's comments as transphobic.

Ivy cited one of the fundamental rules of the International Olympic Committee that the practice of sport is a human right. Her participation in the competition was consistent with rules in force since 2003. Some commentators felt that Ivy had an advantage because of her size and muscle mass. Ivy objected to this criticism: she must keep her testosterone level low as a prerequisite for her participation in sports competitions.

=== 2019 cycling time trial ===
In an October 2019 time trial, Ivy broke the record for the 200-meter sprint for females aged 34–39.

In response, she received a number of death threats, and was targeted on Twitter by Donald Trump Jr. In December 2019, she wrote an op-ed in The New York Times about this experience. Ivy changed her name from Rachel McKinnon with an announcement on Twitter on December 4, 2019

=== 2026 Golf Championship, B.C ===
In early 2025, Ivy stepped away from international cycling to pursue full-time training in golfing. On June 23, 2026, Ivy competed in both the B.C. Women's Mid-Amateur and Mid-Masters golfing tournaments in Chiliwack, B.C., taking first in both events.

== Controversy ==
In August 2019, in relation to the death of American billionaire David Koch, Ivy tweeted that "it's okay to be happy, even celebrate, when bad people die". A respondent, believing Ivy to be alluding to the terminal illness of Magdalen Berns, asked if Ivy "thought it was OK to celebrate the death of a young person suffering from an incurable brain tumor" (quoting the account of the Charleston The Post and Courier). Ivy replied: "if they're a trash human actively trying to harm marginalized people because of who they are? I think it's justified". The exchange provoked a petition by over 500 signatories seeking Ivy's public apology.
