= Iszac Henig =

American swimmer

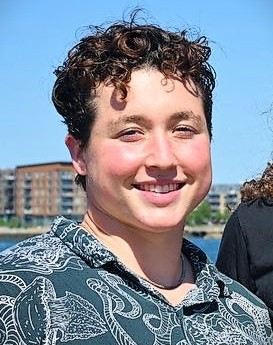
- Henig in 2022

Personal information
- Born: 1999 or 2000 (age 26–27)

Sport
- Sport: Swimming
- Strokes: Freestyle swimming
- College team: Yale University

Iszac Henig is an American swimmer specializing in short distance freestyle races, and an undergraduate at Yale University. He gained particular notice as part of the debate about transgender people in sports when he came out as a trans man, while continuing to swim on the Yale women's team and achieving All-America status at the NCAA Division I Championship. In 2022, he moved from the women's to the men's swim team at Yale, even though it would cost him wins in his final season.

== Early life ==
Henig was born in 1999 or 2000, and grew up in Menlo Park, California.

Henig joined his first summer swimming team at the Ladera, California, recreation district at the age of four, initially to get a suit with a dolphin on it. He was inspired to compete further by Michael Phelps's record number of gold medals at the 2008 Summer Olympics, and began training seriously, starting with year-round swimming at the age of eight. By 2016, he was up to three hours of daily training. He was the only competitive swimmer in his family.

Henig knew he identified as a boy at the age of 14, but was not ready to make the commitment to gender transition. He swam and played water polo in the Castilleja School for girls through 2015, using the gender ambiguous nickname Izzi Henig. There he was the CIF Central Coast Section champion in girls 100-yard freestyle swimming, and he took third in the state championships. In 2014, Henig's Palo Alto Stanford Aquatics 13–14 girls team set the national age group record for the 4 × 50 meter freestyle relay swimming race. In May 2015, Henig set a West Bay Athletic League record in the 200-yard freestyle. He qualified for and attended the 2016 United States Olympic swimming trials in Omaha, Nebraska, but was disqualified for a false start in preliminaries.

Henig transferred to Menlo-Atherton High School in his sophomore year in 2016, and had to sit out of competitive swimming until April. In May 2016 he won three events at the Central Coast Section Swimming and Diving Championships, each qualifying for All-America. He was named the San Mateo Daily Journal Athlete of the Week for that, and later the Daily Journal Swimmer of the Year. In 2017, he won multiple championships at the Peninsula Athletic League, and the 50-yard freestyle at the Central Coast Section championships. In 2018, he won the Central Coast Section championships 100-yard and 50-yard freestyle and took second and fourth place in the state championships. He was captain of the high school swimming team, and continued receiving coaching from former Olympian Dana Kirk of Palo Alto Stanford Aquatics.

== College career ==
Henig entered Yale University in the fall of 2018, to study the ocean organisms that had fascinated him in his youth, but majored in Earth and Planetary Science, for lack of a Yale Marine Biology department. He joined Davenport College, and served as a Communication and Consent Educator, an undergraduate working against sexual violence on the Yale campus.

Henig continued swimming competitively. While swimming on the women's team, he was part of two Yale championship relay teams, and scored three top 10 places in each of the 2019 and 2020 Ivy League Championships. In 2019 he was selected for the College Swimming & Diving Coaches Association of America Scholar All-American Team, recognizing students that both achieved a grade point average of 3.50 or higher and competed at their respective NCAA Championships; he would be selected again in 2020 and 2022. In 2020, he shared an award for scoring the most points in dual meet competition, and took third place in the Ivy League championships for the 100-yard freestyle. He took the 2020–2021 school year off to work at home while Ivy League swimming was canceled for the COVID-19 pandemic.

=== Gender transition ===
In the spring of 2021, Henig came out to his parents and teammates as a trans man, and had a double mastectomy as part of his gender transition. He contributed a short essay on the subject to a June 2021 New York Times article about coming out during the pandemic. His family and teammates accepted his gender transition, and the Yale athletics department supported him on social media. Henig chose not to use masculinizing hormone therapy, such as testosterone, so he could continue swimming on the women's team.

By November 2021 Henig was back in school and competing again, using the name Iszac. That month he broke three Kiphuth Pool records, with his teammates for two 200-yard relays, and individually for the 100-yard freestyle.

On January 8, 2022, Henig set another pool record, this time at the Sheerr Pool of the University of Pennsylvania in the 50-yard freestyle, as well as helping Yale win other events in a match against Penn and Dartmouth. Among the swimmers that Henig directly defeated then was Lia Thomas, a trans woman and Pennsylvania student who had been at the center of the debate about transgender people in sports, with many claiming her biological sex gave her an unfair advantage. Thomas came in sixth in the 100-yard freestyle, which Henig won. Henig also posted a faster time than Thomas in the 400-yard freestyle relay. Due to Henig's, and especially Thomas's, participation, the match attracted national media attention, unusual for a college swimming meet, and boycott threats which did not materialize. Afterwards, an anonymous Pennsylvania swimmer told the sports website OutKick that Thomas was not trying and intentionally let Henig win; Henig said that he had never met Thomas before the event.

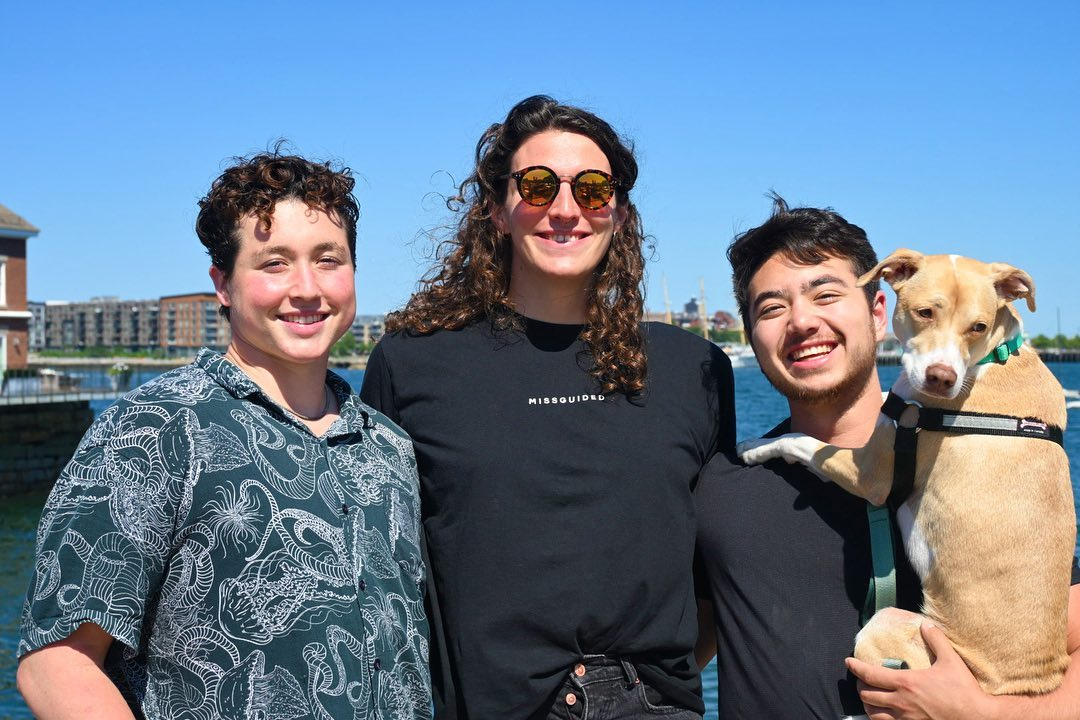
Henig, Lia Thomas, Schuyler Bailar in Boston in 2022

In February 2022, Henig again faced Thomas at the Ivy League championships at Harvard University. This time, there were no protests outside, and "8 Against Hate" signs, representing the eight schools of the Ivy League, hung on the walls and on several athletes' shirts. Thomas narrowly won the 100-yard freestyle over Henig's second place alongside three other events, making her the highest scoring swimmer in the event. Henig won the 50-yard freestyle, setting a pool record as Thomas watched and applauded. Harvard alumnus Schuyler Bailar, the first openly transgender NCAA Division I swimmer, attended to support them both.

In March 2022, when both Henig and Thomas were at the NCAA Division I Women's Swimming and Diving Championships, and protesters opposing Thomas's competing were outside the Georgia Tech Aquatic Center, Henig wrote "let trans kids play" in sharpie marker on his bicep in support of Thomas and against transphobic legislation in sports. His motivation was that NCAA rules prohibited clothing with political statements, but there were no rules about writing on skin. Thomas eventually asked him to write it on her arm as well. Henig took fifth place in the 100-yard freestyle at the championship, earning All-America recognition. Thomas was also in the race (finishing eighth), making it the first NCAA championship final race with two transgender competitors. A group of University of Arizona swimmers cited Henig's achievement in an open letter to the NCAA Board of Governors to oppose transgender athletes competing, writing that Henig's All-America award-winning time would have failed to reach the men's qualifying time. Outsports named Henig and Thomas joint Transgender Athletes of the Year in 2022.

Henig went on testosterone-based hormone therapy after the NCAA championships and moved to the Yale men's swimming team for his 2022-23 senior season. When he swam in the June 2022 Ohio State Invitational, he took from 69th to 79th places in the 50-, 100-, and 200-yard men's freestyle events. He wrote in a New York Times editorial that, while he realized that he would be closer to the bottom of the pack after joining the men's team, it would make him his true, authentic self.
