= Cromwell High School =

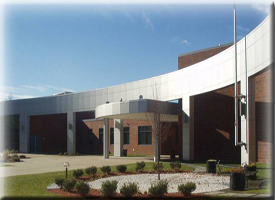

Location
- 1 Donald Harris Drive; Cromwell, Connecticut 06416; United States; 41°36′48″N 72°39′24″W

Information
- Type: Public
- Established: 1956 (70 years ago)
- School district: Cromwell Public Schools
- CEEB code: 070118
- Principal: Andrew Kuckel
- Grades: 9-12
- Enrollment: 515 (2024–2025)
- Colors: Red, black, white
- Athletics conference: Shoreline Conference
- Mascot: Pawly the Panther
- Website: hs.cromwell.k12.ct.us

Cromwell High School a public high school located in Cromwell, Connecticut, United States, serving students in grades 9 through 12 as part of the Cromwell Public Schools district.

== History ==
In 1811, Cromwell High School occupied the building now used as Belden Library, which is adjacent to the town hall. There were 278 students total in this year. In 1902, the Nathaniel White School was built, and was used as the high school for 54 years, until the current high school, Cromwell High School, was built in 1956. The Nathaniel White School is now known as Cromwell Middle School and until September 2006 was used for grades 5–8. Fifth grade is now taught at Woodside Intermediate School along with 3rd and 4th grade. The high school is used for grades 9–12.

Nathaniel White, who died 17 August 1711, was Middletown's second largest landowner, leaving an estate of more than 1500 acres of land, and property. Nathaniel's will showed he gave 1/4th of his share in the common land to "the schools already agreed upon in the town of Middletown, forever. He had already been allowing a school to reside on this property, while he was living, and it is the first instance of an American settler donating their land to the government for public use. When the first proper school was opened in that part of town, now called Cromwell, the town voted unanimously to name it "The Nathaniel White Public School."

== Sports ==
The school colors of Cromwell High School are red, black, and white.

Lacrosse, Football, basketball, soccer, cross country, baseball, softball, cheerleading, chorus, school band, volleyball, tennis, golf, debate team, indoor track, and outdoor track and field are the school sports. Their mascot is Pawly C. Well or Pawly the Panther.

== Notable alumni ==
- David Gere - Actor and film producer; graduate class of 1993.
- Mikey Dickerson - Former head of U.S. Digital Service; graduate class of 1997.
- Andraya Yearwood - American athlete; graduate class of 2020
