= Willy De Bruyn =

Belgian cyclist

Willem Maurits De Bruyn (born Elvira (Elvire) De Bruyn; 4 August 1914 – 13 August 1989), was a Belgian cyclist, who became unofficial women's world champion in 1934 and 1936.

== Biography ==
De Bruyn was born in 1914 in Erembodegem, East Flanders, Belgium with both male and female sex organs. He was officially inscribed as the daughter of his parents, and raised as a girl, but he soon was considerably taller and stronger than other girls his age, and by the age of fourteen he realised that he was not like other girls. This deeply upset and troubled him, even contemplating suicide. After De Bruyn finished his schooling in 1928, he started working in a cigarette company, before working in his parents' café a few months later. In the evenings, he secretly began reading about his condition in medical literature by e.g. Magnus Hirschfeld as well as mythological and anthropological studies. Eventually, he became convinced that he was a hermaphrodite.

De Bruyn started cycling in 1932. In 1933, he won the women's European Championship in Aalst, Belgium. In 1934, he won the Belgian Championship in Leuven and the World Championships in Schaerbeek in front of about 100,000 spectators. By then, De Bruyn had become the biggest Belgian star in women's cycling. However, he felt more and more uncomfortable racing and winning against women due to feeling "like a man, never like a woman". He continued racing to earn money but deliberately finished second or third instead of winning.

De Bruyn learned about Zdeněk Koubek, a Czech athlete who after being a champion woman athlete had become a man. By 1936, he dropped his previous female name Elvire and started living as a man named Willy. However, as he was still registered as a woman named Elvire, he repeatedly came into trouble and lost jobs which were not considered acceptable for women, such as working in a hotel kitchen. Thus, after consulting doctors for examinations and being operated on, De Bruyn officially become Willy de Bruijn by 1937; his story was told in four articles titled "How I became a Man" in the April 1937 issue of the newspaper De Dag.

De Bruyn continued cycling, but without much success. He opened a pub in Brussels, "Café Denderleeuw", where he presented himself as "Willy ex Elvira de Bruyn" and "Elvira de Bruyn, world champion cycling for women, became a man in 1937".

In 1965, Willy de Bruijn was selling "smoutebollen" at the Belgian village at the New York World's Fair.

He died in 1989 in Antwerp.

A street was named after him in Brussels in July 2019.

== Major results ==
- 1932: Belgian Championship
- 27 August 1933: European Championship, Aalst
- 4 August 1934: Belgian Championship, Leuven
- 1934: World Championships, Schaerbeek
- 1934: Sprint event at the track championships, Antwerp

== Tributes ==
On 4 August 2023, Google celebrated De Bruyn's 109th birthday through a doodle, featured as a replacement of the Google Logo in that day for devices at Belgium

On 25 July 2024, The New York Times published a belated obituary for De Bruyn in their Overlooked No More series.
