= Mack Beggs =

American wrestler

- Born: 1999 (age 26–27)
- Education: Euless Trinity High School, Life University
- Occupations: Wrestler, transgender rights activist
- Years active: 2014–present
- Known for: Winning the Texas state girls' wrestling championship twice, transgender rights activism

Mack R. Karam Beggs (born 1999) is an American former high school wrestler from Euless, Texas. Beggs is a trans man. State athletic rules only allowed him to compete in the league for the sex assigned at birth. In 2017, he defeated Chelsea Sanchez in the girls' league to win the Texas girls' 110 lb championship. In 2018, he won the second consecutive state title, defeating Chelsea Sanchez again. In 2019, Beggs was featured in the ESPN 30 for 30 documentary short film Mack Wrestles and as part of the feature-length documentary Changing the Game.

== Wrestling ==
=== High school career ===
En route to the state championships in 2017, two of his opponents forfeited. He ended the 2017 season with a 57–0 record, winning the 110 lb weight class in the girls' division.

In 2018, he was the best in the girls' division with a 32–0 record.

His state championships were considered controversial by some because of the low doses of testosterone Beggs was taking beginning his high school freshman year. Citing the possible advantages testosterone could give Beggs over his female wrestling competitors, some wrestlers and their parents protested, some even forfeiting matches. In a later interview, Beggs said he took hormone blockers to prevent any advantage that could be provided by testosterone.

During high school, Beggs also had finishes in boys' division tournaments, including third place in Greco-Roman (3 person bracket) and third in freestyle wrestling at the USA Wrestling Texas State Championships in 2018 (6 person bracket).

=== College career ===
In 2018, Beggs was given an opportunity to wrestle at the collegiate level as a walk-on in the men's division at a NAIA school. On his Instagram, Beggs announced that he would wrestle for Life University.

He did not compete in the 2018–2019 collegiate wrestling season due to double mastectomy surgery.

== Activism ==
Beggs has called on state legislators to alter University Interscholastic League regulations that require athletes to compete under their gender assigned at birth. Beggs has also stated that the debate over legislation like Senate Bill 6 (also known as the Texas Bathroom Bill) has motivated him to advocate for transgender youth.

In 2023, Beggs testified before the Texas House Higher Education Committee in opposition of Senate Bill 15, which would extend the state's limitations on transgender student athletes at the high school level to Texas' public universities.
