= Executive Order 14201 =

2025 U.S. presidential order

- Keeping Men Out of Women's Sports
- Front page of Executive Order 14201
- Type: Executive order
- Number: 14201
- President: Donald Trump
- Signed: February 5, 2025

Federal Register details
- Federal Register document number: 2025-02513
- Publication date: February 11, 2025
- Document citation: 90 FR 9279

Trump signing the executive order in February 2025

Executive Order 14201, titled "Keeping Men Out of Women's Sports", is an executive order signed by U.S. president Donald Trump in February 2025 in an attempt to ban transgender women athletes of all ages from competing on girls and women's sports teams, based on the "male" and "female" definitions of his Executive Order 14168. Part of a broader targeting of transgender people, the executive order threatens to revoke federal funding from any elementary, secondary, or post-secondary institution that allows transgender girls to play on girls' teams, claiming they are in violation of Title IX.

The order does not ban transgender men athletes from playing on male sports teams.

== Reactions ==
The NCAA president Charlie Baker stated that the NCAA would comply with the executive order, and praised it for providing "a clear, national standard" on the issue compared to the existing conflicting state laws and court decisions previously. Prior to that, less than 10 of the NCAA's 500,000 athletes were trans. On February 6, 2025, the NCAA changed its policy to limit college competitions in women's sports to athletes who were assigned female at birth, effective immediately.

The California Interscholastic Federation which sanctions high school sports in California stated that it would continue to follow state law and allow trans athletes to play high school sports despite the executive order.

== Related polls ==
In January 2025, a New York Times and Ipsos survey found that 79% of Americans support restricting transgender athletes from competing in women's sports.

Previously, a similar poll conducted in 2023 by Gallup found that nearly 69% of U.S. adults say transgender athletes should only be allowed to compete on sports teams that correspond with the sexes they were assigned at birth.

== Related legislation by U.S. Congress ==
In January 2025, the Republican-controlled House of Representatives passed the "Protection of Women and Girls in Sports Act" of 2025 that restricts transgender students from playing on women's sports teams. The measure amended Title IX, the federal education law that bars sex-based discrimination, to define sex as based solely on a person's reproductive biology and genetics at birth. The Republican lawmakers argued the bill will protect equal opportunity in athletics for women, mentioning that cisgender women could have physical disadvantages against transgender athletes. Democratic lawmakers, led by Suzanne Bonamici, claimed that the bill puts young girls who want to play sports at risk of harassment and abuse by allowing adults to ask for gender checks and even perform genital investigations. They pointed to an example of a high school girl in Utah being investigated because "she didn't look feminine enough", and warn about the harassment and bullying that will result from this legislation being introduced.

On March 3, 2025, the bill was blocked in the Senate by a party-line vote of 51–45, falling short of the 60 votes needed to advance the legislation.

== Outcomes ==
Following the executive order, the Department of Education urged high school and college athletics organizations NCAA and NFHS to revoke female transgender athletes' records and restore cisgender athletes' ones. Candice Jackson explained that it is to "restore athletic records to women who have for years been devalued, ignored and forced to watch men steal their accolades."

On February 25, 2025, the State Department announced a ban on transgender athletes from entering the United States if they attempt to compete in women's sports, and that visa applicants suspected of such would have their file marked with the letters 'SWS25' for the purposes of tracking. Visa applicants for any purpose who list a gender other than their assigned sex on their visa application will be permanently banned from entering the United States on grounds of “fraud”.

== See also ==
- 2020s anti-LGBTQ movement in the United States
- Executive Order 14168 ("Defending Women from Gender Ideology Extremism and Restoring Biological Truth to the Federal Government")
- Fairness in Women's Sports Act
- List of executive orders in the second presidency of Donald Trump
- Transgender disenfranchisement in the United States
- Transgender people in sports
- Transgender rights in the United States
- Transphobia in the United States
- Persecution of transgender people under the second Trump administration
