= Masters cycling =

Cycling age category

Masters cycling is an age category of cycling officially established by the Union Cycliste Internationale (UCI) in 1994.

== Competitions ==
- World Masters Track Cycling Championships organized since 1997.
- World Masters Road Cycling Championships organized since 19?.
- European Masters Cycling Championships organized since 19?.
- Asian Masters Cycling Championships organized since 2016.

== See also ==
- Senior sport
- History of the bicycle
- European Cycle Messenger Championships
