= Maiden and married names =

Classes of surname

When a person (traditionally the wife in many cultures) assumes the family name of their spouse, in some countries and cultures that name replaces the person's previous surname, which in the case of the wife is called the maiden name ("birth name" is also used as a gender-neutral or masculine substitute for maiden name), whereas a married name is a family name or surname adopted upon marriage.

In some jurisdictions, changing names requires a legal process. When people marry or divorce, the legal aspects of changing names may be simplified or included, so that the new name is established as part of the legal process of marrying or divorcing. Traditionally, in the Anglophone West, women are far more likely to change their surnames upon marriage than men, but in some instances men may change their last names upon marriage as well, including same-sex couples.

In this article, birth name, family name, surname, married name and maiden name refer to patrilineal surnames unless explicitly described as referring to matrilineal surnames.

== Name changes upon marriage ==
Women changing their own last name after marriage encounter little difficulty in doing so when the opportunity is included in the legal process of marrying. Unless the statutes where the marriage occurred specify that a name change may occur at marriage (in which case the marriage certificate indicates the new name), courts following common law officially recognize it as the right of a person (man, woman, and sometimes child) to change their name. However, men encounter more difficulties in changing their last names.

=== Use husband's family name ===
In the past, a woman in England usually assumed her new husband's family name (or surname) after marriage; often she was compelled to do so under coverture laws. Assuming the husband's surname remains common practice today in the United Kingdom (although there is no law that states the name must be changed) and in other countries such as Australia, New Zealand, Pakistan, India, and the Philippines, including the British Overseas Territories of Gibraltar and the Falkland Islands, Canada (excluding Quebec), and the United States. Often there are variations of name adoption, including family name adoption. Usually, the children of these marriages are given their father's surname.

Some families (mainly in the US) have a custom of using the mother's maiden name as a middle name for one of the children—Franklin Delano Roosevelt received his middle name in this way, as did Isambard Kingdom Brunel in Britain. Some even use the mother's maiden name as a first name, such as Spessard Holland, a former governor of Florida and former senator, whose mother's maiden name was Virginia Spessard.

=== Use wife's family name ===
Todd Fink (born Todd Baechle) and Jack White (born Jack Gillis) are examples of husbands who took their wife's name as their own.

=== Retain the birth name ===
Women who keep their own surname after marriage may do so for a number of reasons:

- Objection to the one-sidedness of this tradition.
- Being the last member of their family with that surname.
- To avoid the hassle of paperwork related to their change of name.
- Wishing to retain their identity.
- Preferring their last name to their spouse's last name.
- To avoid professional ramifications.
- They simply see no reason to change their name, much like men often see no reason to change theirs.

==== Feminism ====
The feminist Lucy Stone (1818–1893) made a national issue of a married woman's right to keep her own surname (as she herself did upon marriage) as part of her efforts for women's rights in the U.S. Because of her, women who choose not to use their husbands' surnames have been called "Lucy Stoners". The feminist Elizabeth Cady Stanton took her husband's surname as part of her own, signing herself Elizabeth Cady Stanton or E. Cady Stanton, but she refused to be addressed as Mrs. Henry B. Stanton. She wrote in 1847 that "the custom of calling women Mrs. John This and Mrs. Tom That and colored men Sambo and Zip Coon, is founded on the principle that white men are lords of all." Later, when addressing the judiciary committee of the state legislature of New York in 1860 in a speech called "A Slave's Appeal", she stated in part, "The negro [slave] has no name. He is Cuffy Douglas or Cuffy Brooks, just whose Cuffy he may chance to be. The woman has no name. She is Mrs. Richard Roe or Mrs. John Doe, just whose Mrs. she may chance to be."

The feminist Jane Grant, co-founder of The New Yorker, wrote in 1943 of her efforts to keep her name despite her marriage, as well as other women's experiences with their maiden names regarding military service, passports, voting, and business. More recently, the feminist Jill Filipovic's opposition to name change for women who marry was published in The Guardian in 2013 as "Why should married women change their names? Let men change theirs", and cited as recommended reading on the theory of social construction of gender in Critical Encounters in Secondary English: Teaching Literacy Theory to Adolescents by Deborah Appleman (2014). When Filipovic married in 2018, she kept her last name.

=== Join both names (hyphenation) ===
It is less common for women, especially in the United States and Canada, to add their spouse's name and their own birth name. There are examples of this, however, in U.S. senator Cindy Hyde-Smith and U.S. sitting congresswomen Sheila Cherfilus-McCormick and Mariannette Miller-Meeks, as well as U.S. former congresswomen Lucille Roybal-Allard, Ileana Ros-Lehtinen, and Debbie Mucarsel-Powell. Former U.S. president Barack Obama's only maternal half-sibling is Maya Soetoro-Ng, formerly Maya Soetoro. Farrah Fawcett was known as Farrah Fawcett-Majors during her marriage to Lee Majors until their separation in 1979. Activist Ruby Doris Smith-Robinson was known as Ruby Doris Smith prior to her marriage.

=== Name blending ===
Although less common than name joining, a growing trend is the blending of two surnames upon marriage. This means adding parts of the two names. An example is Dawn O'Porter (from Porter and O'Dowd).

=== Birth name as middle name ===
Examples include Amy Coney Barrett, Maryanne Trump Barry, Maud Gage Baum, Shirley Temple Black, Vera Cahalan Bushfield, Marguerite Stitt Church, Bonnie Watson Coleman, Cindy Parlow Cone, Hillary Rodham Clinton (dropped maiden name in 2007), Ruth Bader Ginsburg, Marjorie Taylor Greene, Katherine Gudger Langley, Ruth Hanna McCormick, Nelle Wilson Reagan, Edith Nourse Rogers, Sarah Huckabee Sanders, Margaret Chase Smith, and Jada Pinkett Smith. During their respective marriages, Kim Kardashian and Robin Wright were known as Kim Kardashian West (from Kanye West) and Robin Wright Penn (from Sean Penn). Politician Nikki Haley is sometimes referred to as Nikki R. Haley; the "R" stands for Randhawa, her birth surname.

=== Spouse's surname as middle name ===
Examples include Brooklyn Peltz Beckham and John Ono Lennon (wife's name) and Marie Gluesenkamp Perez (husband's name). When British author Neil Gaiman married American musician Amanda Palmer, he added his wife's middle name to his, becoming Neil Richard MacKinnon Gaiman.

=== New name ===
Some couples will create an entirely new surname for themselves upon marriage, with no ties to either's original surname. This practice is less common than name blending.

== North America ==
=== Canada ===
In most of Canada, either partner may informally assume the spouse's surname after marriage, so long as it is not for the purposes of fraud. The same is true for people in common-law relationships, in some provinces. This is not considered a legal name change in most provinces, excluding British Columbia. For federal purposes, such as a Canadian passport, Canadians may also assume their partner's surname if they are in a common-law relationship. In the province of British Columbia, people have to undergo a legal name change if they want to use a combined surname after marriage. Their marriage certificate is considered proof of their new name.

The custom in Québec was similar to the one in France until 1981. Women would traditionally go by their husband's surname in daily life, but their maiden name remained their legal name. Since the passage of a 1981 provincial law intended to promote gender equality, as outlined in the Québec Charter of Rights, no change may be made to a person's name without the authorization of the registrar of civil status or the authorization of the court. Married individuals who wish to change their names upon marriage must therefore go through the same procedure as those changing their names for other reasons. The registrar of civil status may authorize a name change if:

1. the name the person generally uses does not correspond to the name on their birth certificate,
2. the name is of foreign origin or too difficult to pronounce or write in its original form, or
3. the name invites ridicule or has become infamous.

Marriage by itself is not considered to be an acceptable reason for a legal name change and a person may be required to show documentation that keeping their maiden name would cause psychological harm. This law has been criticized as taking away a woman's choice in choosing her name. Women married outside of Quebec are also expected to use their birth name as their legal name if they reside in the province.

=== United States ===
There were some early cases in the United States that held that under common law, a woman was required to take her husband's name, but newer cases overturned that (see "Retain the birth name" above). Currently, American women do not have to change their names by law. Lindon v. First National Bank, 10 F. 894 (W.D. Pa. 1882), is one of the very earliest precedent-setting US federal court cases involving common law name change. A woman who had changed her last name to one that was not her husband's original surname was trying to claim control over her inheritance. The court ruled in her favor. This set forth many things. By common law, one may lawfully change their name and be "known and recognized" by that new name. Also, one may enter into any kinds of contracts in their new adopted name. Contracts include employment (see Coppage v. Kansas 236 U.S. 1), and one can be recognized legally in court in their new name. In 1967 in Erie Exchange v. Lane, 246 Md. 55 (1967) the Maryland Court of Appeals held that a married woman can lawfully adopt an assumed name, even if it is not her birth name or the name of her lawful husband, without legal proceedings. In the United States, only eight states provide for an official name change for a man as part of their marriage process, and in others a man may petition a court or—where not prohibited—change his name without a legal procedure (though government agencies sometimes do not recognize this procedure). The practice remains popular in the 21st century. According to a Pew Research Center survey published in September 2023, nearly 4 out of every 5 women in heterosexual marriages in the United States changed their last names to those of their husbands. On the other hand, 92% of all men in these marriages kept their last names.

In 2007, Michael Buday and Diana Bijon enlisted the American Civil Liberties Union and filed a discrimination lawsuit against the state of California. According to the ACLU, the obstacles facing a husband who wishes to adopt his wife's last name violated the equal protection clause provided by the 14th Amendment of the Constitution. At the time of the lawsuit, only the states of Georgia, Hawaii, Iowa, Massachusetts, New York and North Dakota explicitly allowed a man to change his name through marriage with the same ease as a woman. As a result of the lawsuit, the Name Equality Act of 2007 was passed to allow either spouse to change their name, using their marriage license as the means of the change; the law took effect in 2009.

In the United States, some states or areas have laws that restrict what surname a child may have. For example, Tennessee allows a child to be given a surname that does not include that of the father only upon "the concurrent submission of a sworn application to that effect signed by both parents."

In Massachusetts, a Harvard study in 2004 found that about 87% of college-educated women take their husbands' name on marriage, down from a peak before 1975 of over 90%, but up from about 80% in 1990. The same study found women with a college degree were "two to four times (depending on age) more likely to retain their surname" than those without a college degree.

=== Mexico ===
Following Latin American tradition, children are typically given a surname that combines the paternal surnames of their parents. In 2017, a child took their parents maternal surnames and was the first person to be legally allowed to do so.

== Europe ==
=== Austria ===
In Austria, since 1 April 2013, marriage does not automatically change a woman's name; therefore a name change can only take place upon legal application. Before that date, the default was for a married woman's name to be changed to that of her husband, unless she legally applied to opt out of this.

=== France ===
In France, by executive decision since 2011 and by law since 2013, any married person may officially use their spouse's name as a common name by substituting or compounding it to their own. Before this it was common for married women to use their husband's name in everyday life, but this had no legal recognition.

A common name does not replace a person's family name as written on their birth certificate.

From 4 March 2002 to 4 December 2009, children given both parents' names had to have them separated by a double dash (ex: Dupont--Clairemont). On 4 December 2009, the Conseil d'État ruled that a space can be used instead of the double dash. As a result, forms asking for the choice of family name for a child (nom de famille) do so on two lines ("1ère partie: ..... ", "2e partie: ....")

=== Germany ===
In Germany, since 1977, a woman may adopt her husband's surname or a man may adopt his wife's surname. As an alternative, one of them may adopt a name combined from both surnames; the remaining unchanged surname is the "family name" (Ehename), which will be the surname of the children. If a man and woman both decide to keep and use their birth names after the wedding (no combined name), they shall declare one of those names the "family name". A combined name is not possible as a family name, but, since 2005, it has been possible to have a double name as a family name if one already had a double name, and the partner adopts that name. Double names then must be hyphenated. All family members must use that double name. In 2025 true double names became legal for spouses as well as the possibility to have children bearing a double name whereas parents retain their birth names

=== Greece ===
Since 1983, when Greece adopted a new marriage law which guaranteed gender equality between the spouses, women in Greece are required to keep their birth names for their whole lives.

=== Iceland ===
In Iceland, women retain their birth surnames, which are typically patronymic or occasionally matronymic: they indicate the woman's father (or mother) and not a historic family lineage. Iceland shares a common cultural heritage with the Scandinavian countries of Denmark, Norway, and Sweden. Unlike these countries, Icelanders have continued to use their traditional name system, which was formerly used in most of Northern Europe. The Icelandic system is thus not based on family names (although some people do have family names and might use both systems). Generally, a woman's last name indicates the first name of her father (patronymic) or in some cases mother (matronymic) in the genitive, followed by -dóttir ("daughter"). Icelanders, male and female, are not addressed using surnames, but first names. For example, the Icelandic prime minister Kristrún Mjöll Frostadóttir, though married, is referred to as Kristrún.

=== Italy ===
Spouses keep their original surnames. According to the Italian Civil Code (article 143 bis), a woman who marries keeps her surname and has the option of adding her husband's surname after hers. Non-Italian citizens getting married in Italy will not have their surname changed in Italy. However, brides or grooms can request their surname change in their home country.

=== Netherlands ===
In the Netherlands, persons who have been married in the Netherlands or entered into a registered partnership will remain registered under their birth name. They are, however, permitted to use their partner's last name for social purposes or join both names. Upon marriage or registered partnership, one may also indicate how one would like to be addressed by registering one's choice at the Municipal Basis Administration (Basisregistratie Personen), although their birth name does not change. One may choose to be called by one's own name, one's partner's name, one's own name followed by one's partner's name (hyphenated), or one's partner's name followed by their own name (hyphenated; this was the prevailing convention up to very recently. In this case the maiden name following the hyphen only uses a capital if it is a noun; if it is an affix like van or de the affix remains uncapitalized; this is an exception to the general rule for surnames that are capitalized when standing alone). Both men and women may make this choice upon registering to get married or entering into a registered partnership. If the marriage or registered partnership ends, one may continue to use the ex-partner's last surname unless the ex-partner disagrees and requests the court to forbid the use of the ex-partner's surname.

Before the birth or adoption of a first child, married parents or parents in a registered partnership may choose the child's surname. This can be either the father's name, the mother's name or both. There is a maximum of two last names, so children of people with double last names AB and CD have to choose between either of those names (AB or CD), or a combination of these names (AC, CA, AD, DA, BC, CB, BD, DB), but not only one part (A, B, C or D) or reverse of current names (BA or DC). If no choice is made, the child automatically bears (only) the father's surname. Any further children will also go by this name. If the parents are not married, the children will automatically have their mother's name unless otherwise indicated.

=== Portugal ===
Wives usually append the family name of their spouse to their legal name, although there is a recent trend of women keeping their maiden names. Following Portuguese naming customs, a person's name consists of a given name (simple or composite) followed by two family names (surnames), the mother's and the father's. Any children whom a couple have together, take both second-surnames.

=== Russia ===
There is a widespread, though not universal, custom for a newly married wife to adopt the husband's family name. However, as Russia is not a common law country, any name change requires a formal procedure including an official application to the civil acts registrar. As the same registrar also records marriages, for the convenience sake it is often done during the marriage proceedings, as governed by the Federal Law #143-FZ "On Civil State Acts", and the couple's marriage certificate has an option of having one common family name, or both spouses going by their original surname. However, the law is entirely gender neutral, and the couple may adopt either of their surnames (a husband adopting his wife's family name is an uncommon but by no means unheard-of practice, which is generally accepted and carries little to no social stigma), or even a completely different one. The law also recognizes the couple's right to use the combined family name, and for the either of the spouses to reclaim their original surname in the case the marriage is dissolved.

=== Scotland ===
In the lowlands of Scotland in the 16th century, married women did not change their surnames, but today it is common practice to do so.

=== Spain ===
Spouses have always kept their original surnames. Following Spanish naming customs, a person's name consists of a given name (simple or composite) followed by two family names (surnames), the father's and the mother's. Any children whom a couple have together take both first-surnames, so if "José Gómez Hevia" and "María Reyes García" had a child named "Andrés", the resulting name would be "Andrés Gómez Reyes".

Law 11/1981 in Spain, enacted in 1981, declared among other things that children, on turning 18, now had a legal option to choose whether their father's or mother's surname came first. If a family did not exercise an option to change the order of the names in their surname, the law defaulted to the father's surname as the first.

Also in Spain, a 1995 reform in the law allows the parents to choose whether the father's or the mother's surname goes first, although this order must be the same for all their children. For instance, the name of the son of the couple in the example above could be "Andrés Gómez Reyes" or "Andrés Reyes Gómez".

In some Spanish-American countries it is customary for women to unofficially add the husband's first surname after her own, for social purposes such as invitation letters or event announcements. The couple above may introduce themselves as José Gómez Hevia and María Reyes de Gómez. It is also common to name, in formal settings, the wife of a man as "señora de", followed by her husband's first surname.

=== Turkey ===
Since 2014, women in Turkey are allowed to keep their birth names alone for their whole life instead of using their husbands' names. Previously, the Turkish Code of Civil Law, Article 187, required a married woman to use her husband's surname; or else to use her birth name in front of her husband's name by giving a written application to the marriage officer or the civil registry office. In 2014, the Constitutional Court ruled that prohibiting married women from retaining only maiden names is a violation of their rights.

== Asia ==
=== China ===
Traditionally, unlike in Anglophone Western countries, a married woman keeps her name unchanged, without adopting her husband's surname. In mainland China a child inherits their father's surname as a norm, though the marriage law explicitly states that a child may use either parent's surname. It is also possible, though far less common, for a child to combine both parents' surnames. Amongst the Chinese diaspora overseas, especially in Southeast Asia, women rarely legally adopt their spouse's surname.

=== Hong Kong ===
Due to British influence, some people in Hong Kong have also adopted the tradition of women changing their English last name, or prepending their husband's Chinese surname to their own in official occasions or business cards but rarely on resident identification or travel documents. An example is former chief executive Carrie Lam Cheng Yuet-ngor, who prepended her husband Lam Siu-por's surname to hers.

=== Iran ===
It became mandatory in 1918 to use surnames in Iran, and only in this time, the heads of families had the right to choose their family members' (including the wife) surname. It is stated in the article four of the law on Civil Registration in 1925, that "Everybody should choose his/her own name. The wife... maintains her family name that was called by." The same thing has been restated in the article three of the law on Civil Registration in 1928. There is not much difference in the article 38 of the law on Civil Registration in 1940, but there is another article (43) that says "If the couple separate legally, maintaining husband's surname is allowed if the husband allows, and if the husband has taken wife's family name, maintaining wife's surname is allowed if the wife allows." In the last related article (the article 42 of the law on Civil Registration in 1976) the same thing is said about wife's surname change, but it is silent about husband's surname change. Currently, it is very unusual that either spouse change his/her surname after marriage in Iran.

=== Japan ===
Japanese law does not recognize married couples who have different surnames as lawful husband and wife. According to 2019 data, 95.5% of women took their husband's surname upon marriage. The constitutionality of this law has been challenged in court.

In a 2015 ruling, and again in a 2021 ruling, the plaintiffs argued that forcing couples to share a surname violates the constitution, specifically the principles of individual dignity and gender equality, as the burden of changing a name disproportionately falls on women, causing a loss of identity.

However, the Supreme Court of Japan has twice upheld the law, ruling it constitutional. In both the 2015 and 2021 decisions, the Court stated that the single-surname system is well-established in Japanese society and is a rational way to identify family members. The Court also noted that any disadvantages from a name change are mitigated by the widespread informal use of maiden names, and concluded that the issue of allowing separate spousal names is a matter for the Diet (Japan's parliament) to decide, not the judiciary.

Legal challenges continued in 2024. In March, on International Women's Day, a total of twelve plaintiffs (six couples) filed lawsuits against the government in both the Tokyo and Sapporo district courts. The plaintiffs are seeking damages, arguing that "the current situation, where one party must abandon their surname to marry, harms individual dignity."

The issue has also drawn international scrutiny. In November 2024, the U.N. Committee on the Elimination of Discrimination against Women (CEDAW) urged the Japanese government to revise the Civil Code to allow married couples to choose separate surnames. The committee expressed deep concern that the current system is discriminatory and disproportionately impacts women, recommending that Japan "ensure that women and men can choose their family name upon marriage without any constraints or discrimination."

In Japan, women who marry and take their husband’s surname — as well as the very small number of men who take their wife’s surname (such as the husband of current PM Sanae Takaichi for example) — may continue to use their former surname alongside their legal surname on identity documents such as driver’s licenses, health insurance cards, My Number cards, and passports, by presenting documents that prove their maiden or former name, such as an extract from the family register, a birth registration record, or a copy of their residence certificate showing their previous surname.

For example, if a woman whose surname was Hayashi marries a man named Tagawa and takes his surname, her passport may list her surname as TAGAWA (HAYASHI).

=== North Korea and South Korea ===
Traditionally, Korean women keep their family names after their marriage, while their children usually take the father's surname. Korea used to be relatively gender equal as of inheritance and familial duties up until at least the late 17th century. Often, family genealogy books would keep track of the daughters and their spouses and offspring too. As such, it was the norm for women to keep their maiden name and they were considered to be part of the family even after marriage. Before modern times, people were very conscious of familial values and their own family identities. It is therefore traditional for Korean women keep their surnames after marriage, based on traditional reasoning that it is what they inherited from their parents and ancestors. Colloquially, Koreans consider the name of an individual as a singular entity, and changing the family name syllable would make the name sound strange with the other syllables of the given name.

Nowadays, women still keep their names after marriage. Children can have either parent's surname, but it is customary to use the father's surname.

=== Philippines ===
Article 370 of the Civil Code states:

A married woman may use:
(1) Her maiden first name and surname and add her husband’s surname, or
(2) Her maiden first name and her husband’s surname, or
(3) Her husband’s full name, but prefixing a word indicating that she is his wife, such as “Mrs.”

The usage of the word “may” implies that a woman can retain her maiden name without adding her husband's, and Articles 371 and 372 explicitly state that a woman may resume using her original name upon legal separation or exercise the option to continue using the husband's name unless either the court decrees otherwise or either spouse remarries. The Supreme Court ruling Yasin v. Sharia Court reiterated this, noting Arturo Tolentino's commentary that usage of “may” indicates a permissive action. Nevertheless, this caused confusion among some people, leading them to believe that the Civil Code required women to change their surnames, when it wasn't actually the case. On 21 March 2023, the House of Representatives passed a bill to revise the Civil Code to explicitly declare that a woman can keep her surname.

Married women in professional circles (e.g. Gloria Macapagal Arroyo, Korina Sanchez-Roxas, Vilma Santos-Recto) typically join their maiden and married surnames in both professional and legal use. This allows them to be identified as married, and keep track of their professional achievements without being confused for any similarly named individuals. An older scheme based on Spanish naming customs add the particle de ("of") between the maiden and married surnames. This tradition is no longer common.

=== Taiwan ===
Taiwanese women generally keep their surnames after marriage, while their children may inherit either the father's or the mother's. It is, however, legal to take the spouse's surname. Some older women have the husband's surname tagged on to theirs, as was common in the early to mid-20th century.

=== Thailand ===
A Thai wife who adopted her husband's surname due to the old law requiring it, can also change back to her original surname.

=== Vietnam ===
In Vietnamese culture, women keep their family names once they marry, whilst the children produced by the couple tend to keep the father's family name.

== Use as security question ==
One's mother's maiden name has been a common security question in banking since at least the 1980s. It is a security question which can be easily circumvented by hackers.

== See also ==
- Birth name § Maiden and married names
- Galton–Watson process
- Matriname
- Matronymic
- Name change
- Patronymic
