= Name change =

Legal act by a person of adopting a different name

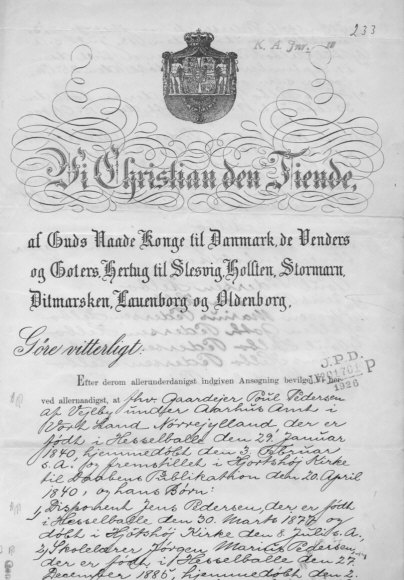
Name change certificate issued by Christian X of Denmark in 1917

Name change is the legal act by a person of adopting a new name.

The procedures and ease of a name change vary between jurisdictions. In general, common law jurisdictions have looser procedures while civil law jurisdictions are more restrictive. While some civil law jurisdictions have loosened procedures, a few remain complicated.

A pseudonym is a name used in addition to the original or true name. This does not require legal sanction. Pseudonyms may be adopted to conceal a person's identity, but may also be used for personal, social or ideological reasons.

== Reasons for changing one's name ==
=== Changes in status ===
- Marriage or civil partnership (e.g. by taking someone's name or combining names)
- Adoption by or marriage of a custodial parent
- Divorce or estrangement of parents
- Religious conversion or deconversion, ordination or return to lay status (e.g. Cassius Clay to Muhammad Ali upon conversion to Islam, Ibrahim Yassin to Avraham Sinai upon conversion to Judaism)
- To better fit one's gender identity, or as part of one's gender transition (e.g. Chaz Bono, born Chastity Bono)
- To reflect immigration or adaptation of the name to a different language or script (e.g. Roberto Firmino from Robert Firm after becoming a Brazilian national)

=== Associative ===
- To associate themselves with a hobby, interest, or accomplishment (e.g. Henry Lizardlover, born Schifberg)
- To associate themselves with a famous or fictional person (e.g. old name Simon Johnson, new name Simon Pendragon)
- To remove associations from a family black sheep (e.g. relatives of Adolf Hitler).
- To remove associations from an ethnic origin (e.g. changing Battenberg to Mountbatten or Jan Ludvik Hoch to Robert Maxwell).
- To remove associations from a slave name (e.g. Malcolm X, born Little).
- To reclaim a traditional name (e.g. many indigenous Canadians did so under new legislation in 2021).

=== Practical ===
- To evade the law, a debt or to commit fraud. (Illegal in many jurisdictions)
- To avoid a stalker or harassment.
- In accordance with witness protection.
- Personal dislike of one's name (e.g. old surname Lipschitz, new surname London)
- To bring the legal name in line with the one used in everyday life (e.g. Michael Caine adopted his stage name legally after using it for most of his career).

=== Financial ===
- To receive an inheritance conditional on adopting the name of the deceased (e.g. Augustus Pitt Rivers was required to adopt that surname when he inherited from his cousin, Horace Pitt-Rivers; this reason was once quite common among landowning families in the UK).
- Commercial sponsorship (e.g. Jimmy White temporarily became Jimmy Brown for HP brown sauce, Ashley Revell became Ashley Blue Square Revell for Rank Group's Blue Square service, Peter Janson briefly changed his name by deed poll to NGK Janson to circumvent a Motorsport Australia rule that only allowed a driver's, and not a sponsor's, name to be carried on a windscreen at the 1977 Bathurst 1000).
- To make their name more attractive or "catchy" so as to increase their chance of professional success (see Stage name).

=== Other ===
- Protest or activism
- To gain superstitious consequences of the old name (e.g. Joko Widodo, born Mulyono)
- To circumvent election law governing what information can be provided on a ballot paper, by changing (for example) one's middle name to a short political message (see Byron (Low Tax) Looper).
- Losing a bet (e.g. a New Zealand man changed his name to Full Metal Havok More Sexy N Intelligent Than Spock And All The Superheroes Combined With Frostnova, and apparently discovered it had been accepted when his passport expired.)

== United Kingdom ==
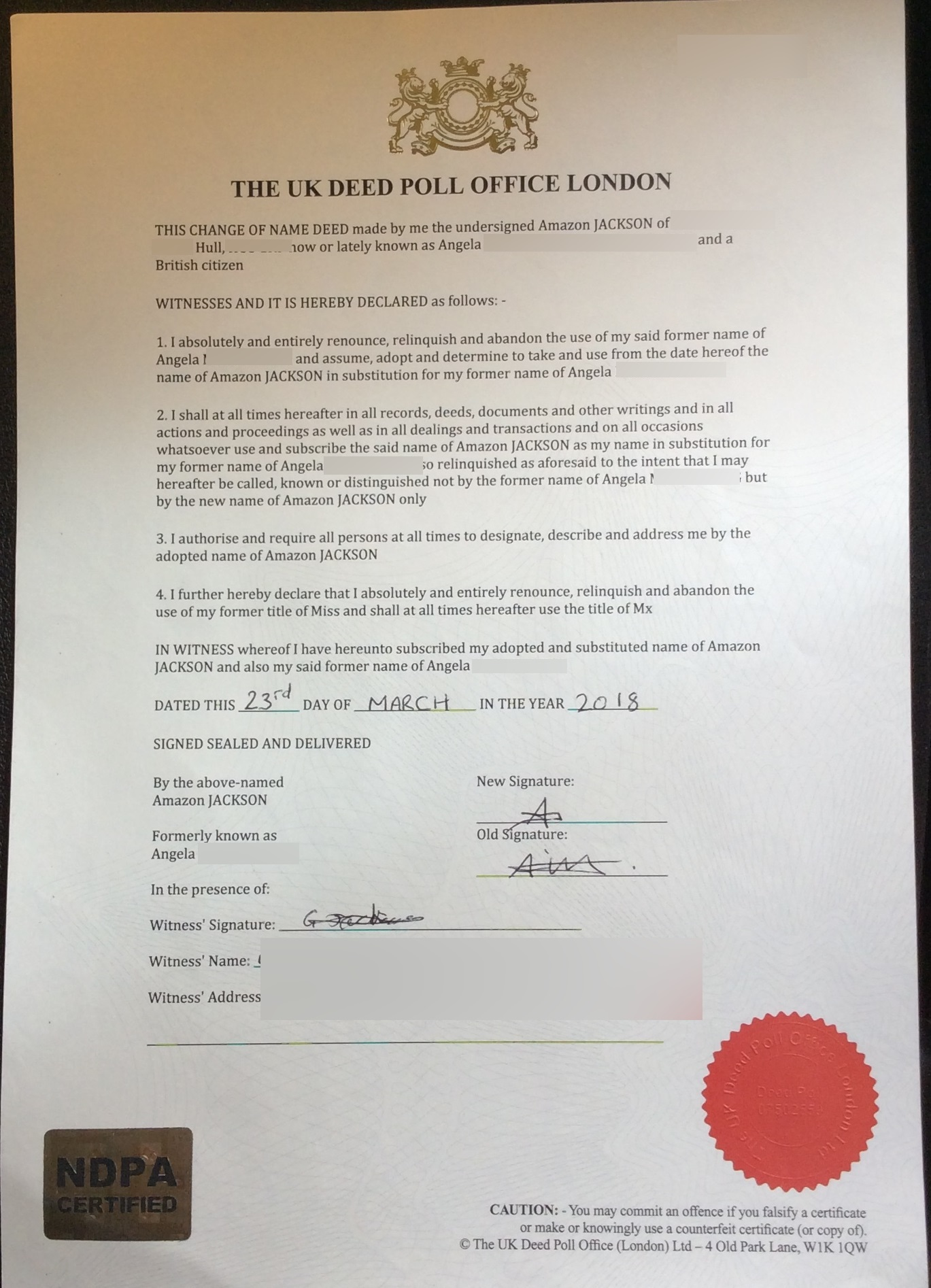
A Deed Poll for Change of Name, drawn up in England from a private company

In the United Kingdom, citizens and residents have the freedom to change their names with relative ease.

In theory, anyone who is at least 16 and resident in the United Kingdom can call themselves whatever they wish. However, over the past hundred years or so, formal procedures that are recognised by record holders such as government departments, companies and organizations have evolved, which enable someone to change the name recorded on their passport, driving licence, tax and National Insurance records, bank and credit cards, etc., provided that "documentary evidence" of a change of name is provided. Documents such as birth, marriage and educational certificates cannot be changed because these documents are considered "matters of fact", which means that they were correct at the time they were issued. However, exceptions exist, such as holders of a Gender Recognition Certificate.

Documentary evidence of a change of name can be in a number of forms, such as a marriage certificate, decree absolute (proof of divorce), civil partnership certificate, statutory declaration or deed of change of name. Such documents are mere evidence that a change of name has occurred and they do not themselves operate to change a person's name. Deeds of change of name are by far the most commonly used method of providing evidence of a change of name other than changing a woman's surname after marriage. A deed poll is a legal document that binds a single person to a particular course of action (in this case, changing one's name for all purposes). The term 'deed' is common to signed, written agreements that have been shown to all concerned parties. 'Poll' is an old legal term referring to official documents that had cut edges (were polled) so that they were straight.

=== England and Wales ===
People whose births are registered in England and Wales may, but are under no obligation to, have their deed poll enrolled at the Royal Courts of Justice in London.

=== Scotland ===
Residents of Scotland can change their name by deed poll or statutory declaration. Scottish-born/adopted people may optionally apply to the Registrar General for Scotland to have their birth certificate amended to show the new name and have the respective register updated. There is also an alternative route to changing one's name in Scotland, equivalent to enrolling a deed poll with the College of Arms; one may petition the Court of the Lord Lyon for a name change and subsequently receive a Certificate of Recognition of Change of Name.

=== Historical usage ===
From the medieval age to the 19th century, the era of family dynasties, name changes were frequently demanded of heirs in the last wills and testaments, legacies and bequests, of members of the gentry and nobility who were the last males of their bloodline. Such persons frequently selected a younger nephew or cousin as the heir to their estates, on condition that he should adopt the surname and armorials of the legator in lieu of his patronymic. Thus, the ancient family otherwise destined to extinction would appear to continue as a great dynasty in the making.

Such changes were also more rarely demanded by marriage settlements, for example where the father of a sole daughter and heiress demanded that as a condition of his daughter's dowry her husband should adopt his father-in-law's surname and arms. Thus the progeny of the marriage would continue the otherwise extinct family's name. Such name changes were generally only demanded of younger sons, where an elder brother was available to inherit the paternal estates under primogeniture and carry on the name and arms abandoned by the younger brother. Such name changes were effected by obtaining a private act of Parliament or by obtaining a royal licence.

Well known examples are:

- Russell to Gorges (14th century). Ralph IV Gorges, 2nd Baron Gorges, died without issue in 1331. In an effort to preserve his family name and arms he made one of his younger nephews his heir, on condition that he should adopt the name and arms of Gorges. This nephew was William Russell, the second son of his second sister Eleanor de Gorges who had married Sir Theobald Russell (d. 1341) of Kingston Russell, Dorset. The event is referred to in one of the earliest heraldic law cases brought concerning English armory, Warbelton v Gorges in 1347.
- Smithson to Percy (18th century). Sir Hugh Smithson, 4th Baronet (1715–1786) in 1740 married Lady Elizabeth Seymour, daughter and sole heiress of Algernon Seymour, 7th Duke of Somerset, and granddaughter of Lady Elizabeth Percy (d. 1722), daughter and sole heiress of Josceline Percy, 11th Earl of Northumberland (1644–1670). In 1740, by a private act of Parliament, the Hugh Earl of Northumberland's Name and Arms Act 1749 (23 Geo. 2. c. 14 Pr.), Smithson changed his surname to Percy and inherited the title Earl of Northumberland and was later created Duke of Northumberland.

A less radical procedure adopted from the 18th century onwards was for the legator or settlor to demand only that the legatee or beneficiary should adopt his surname in addition to his patronymic, not in place of it, which gave rise to the "double-barrelled", even the "triple-barrelled" name, frequently parodied in literature as epitomising the wealthy "squirearchy" with an embarrassment of inherited estates.

== Canada ==
In Canada, name changes are handled through the vital statistics bureaux of the various provinces and territories, except in Nunavut, where they are handled by the Courts.

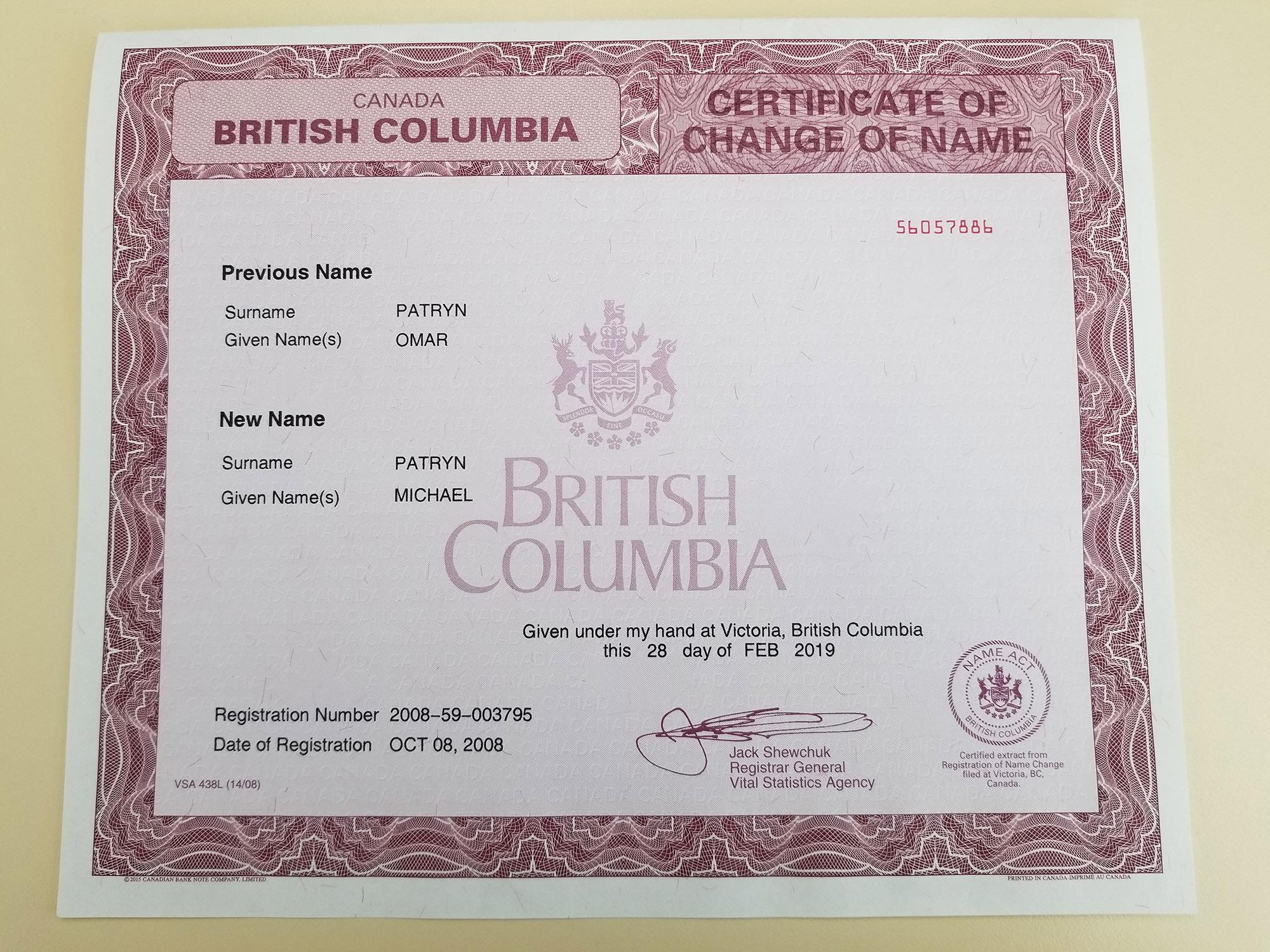
A Certificate of Change of Name issued by British Columbia

All Canadian provinces and territories allow their residents, whether Citizens, Permanent Residents or Temporary Residents, to obtain a name change, provided they fulfil the pertinent regulations (e.g. time lived in province). Quebec, a civil law jurisdiction, has historically had substantial differences from the common law jurisdictions comprising the rest of Canada in how it permits its residents to obtain a change of name—for example, requiring them to be citizens, which was abolished on January 28, 2021, due to a Superior Court of Quebec decision.

All Canadian provinces except Quebec also recognize common law name changes—i.e. by "general usage"—even if not registered with the government or ordered by a court. Although a common law name change is still a legal name, formal processes may be required to obtain government-issued ID or change the name on accounts (like banks) that depend on government ID; this is one situation where a person may have more than one name.

Quebec also historically had other strict regulations regarding name changes. For example, the transgender Quebecker Micheline Montreuil had to undergo a lengthy process to have her name legally changed. Initially, the Directeur de l'état civil refused to permit the change on the grounds that someone who was legally assigned male at birth could not bear a female name. According to Quebec law, Montreuil could not change her registered gender because that required proof of a completed gender confirmation surgery, which was not the case for her. On November 1, 1999, the provincial court of appeals ruled that nothing in the law prevented a person who was registered as male from legally adopting a woman's name.

Another issue specific to Quebec is married names. Because of the Quebec Charter of Rights, married women in Quebec have been unable to adopt their spouse's surname since 1976. Other provinces allow their residents to change their last name on the strength of their marriage certificate. The Directeur de l'état civil will amend a Quebec birth certificate if a name change certificate is issued by another province. Some have used that loophole to legally change their names by temporarily moving to another Canadian province or territory, which follow more permissive common law rules.

Additionally, Saskatchewan registers changes of name made outside its jurisdiction and issues a "Registration of Change of Name Effected Outside the Province of Saskatchewan".

== United States ==
In the United States, state laws regulate name changes. Several federal court rulings have set precedents regarding both court decreed name changes and common law name changes (changing the name at will), including Lindon v. First National Bank. In Christianson v. King County, 239 U.S. 356 (1915), the Supreme Court accepted a name changed using the common law method as a legal name (more detail of the decision accepted by the Supreme Court is found at 196 F. 791 (1912)).

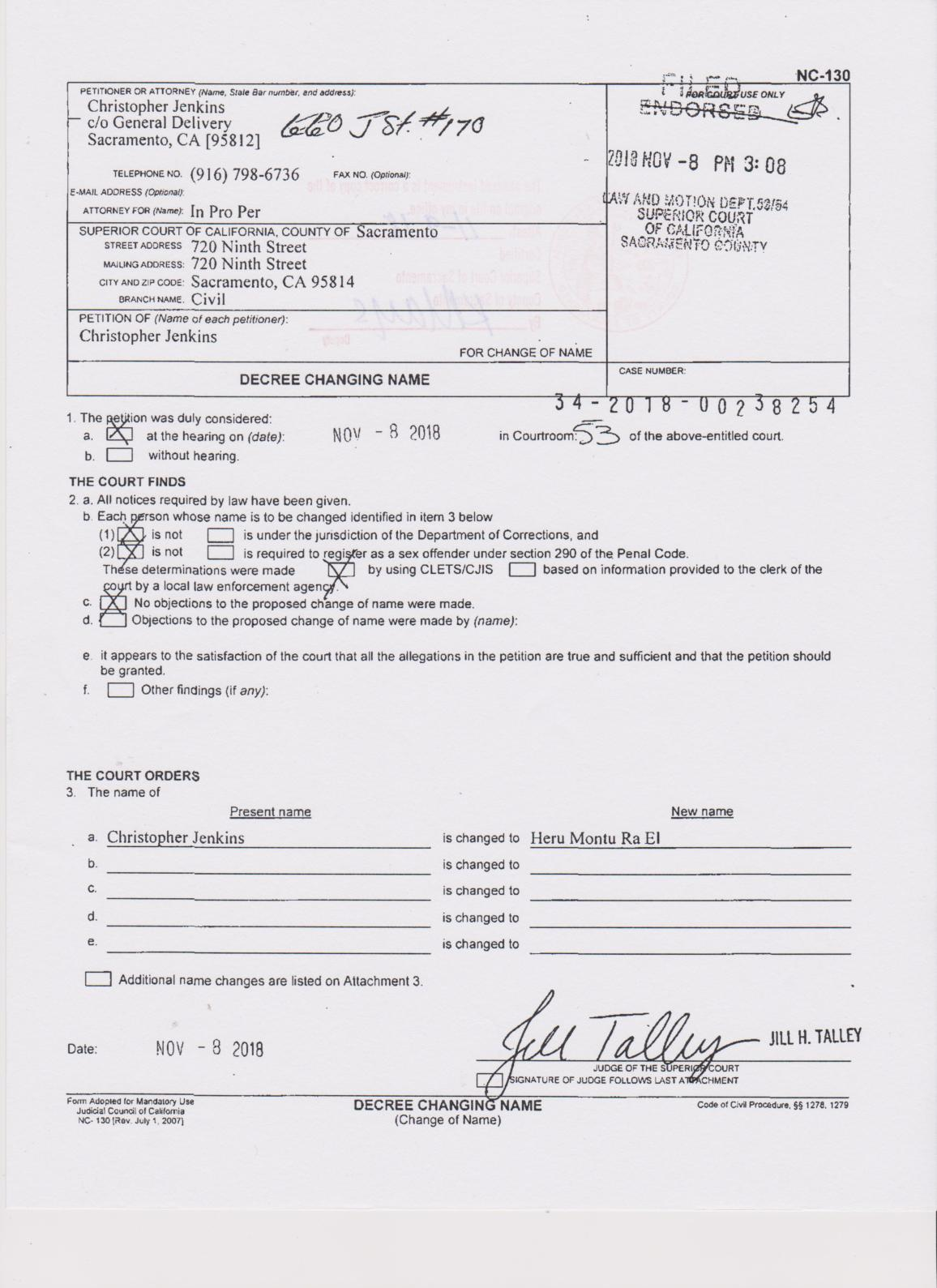
A Change of Name Decree issued by California

Usually a person can adopt any name desired for any reason. As of 2009, 46 states allow a person legally to change names by usage alone, with no paperwork, but a court order may be required for many institutions (such as banks or government institutions) to officially accept the change. Although the states (except Louisiana) follow common law, there are differences in acceptable requirements; usually a court order is the most efficient way to change names (which would be applied for in a state court), except at marriage, which has become a universally accepted reason for a name change.

Where a court process is used, it is necessary to plead that the name change is not for a fraudulent or other illegal purpose, such as evading a lien or debt or for defaming someone else. Applicants may be required to give a reasonable explanation for wanting to change their names. A fee is generally payable, and the applicant may be required to post legal notices in newspapers to announce the name change. Generally the judge has limited judicial discretion to deny a change of name: usually only if the name change is for fraudulent, frivolous or immoral purposes. In 2004, a Missouri man succeeded in changing his name to "They". The Minnesota Supreme Court ruled that a name change to "1069" could be denied, but that "Ten Sixty-Nine" was acceptable (Application of Dengler, 1979); the North Dakota Supreme Court had denied the same request several years before (Petition of Dengler, 1976).

In nearly all states, a person cannot choose a name that is intended to mislead (such as adopting a celebrity's name), that is intentionally confusing, or that incites violence; nor can one adopt, as a name, a racial slur, a threat, or an obscenity.

Some examples of typically allowed reasons for name changes in the U.S. include:

- Adopting a new surname upon marriage (typically the surname of the spouse, a hyphenated surname, or some combination of parts of both surnames). This is usually done without court proceedings.
- Returning to the use of a prior surname (e.g. a maiden name) upon divorce.
- Simplification or improved familiarity of spelling or pronunciation.

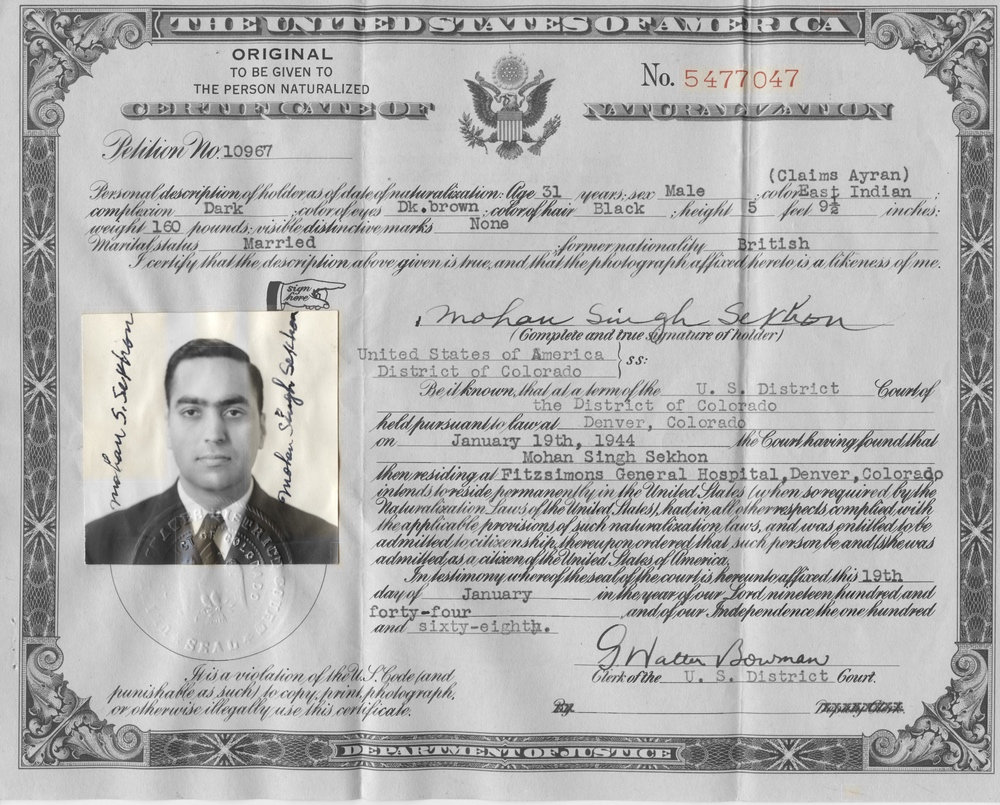
A Certificate of Naturalization's obverse

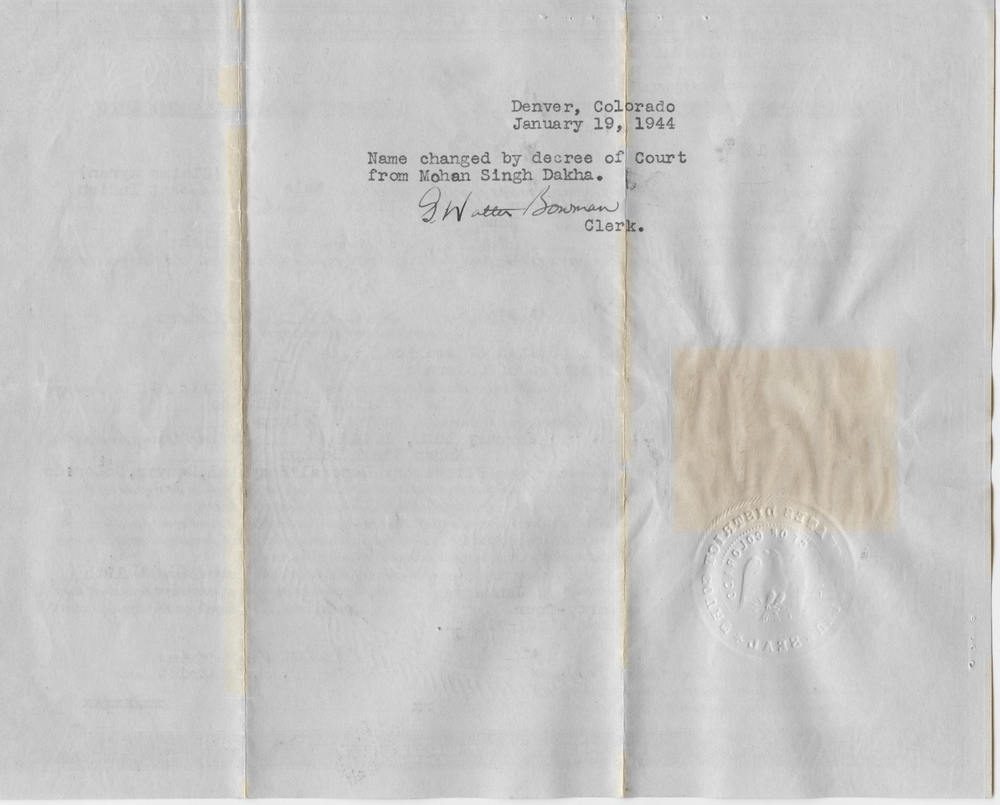
A Certificate of Naturalization's reverse, annotated with details of the naturalized citizen's change of name

Under U.S. nationality law, when immigrants apply for naturalization, they have the option of asking for their names to be changed upon the grant of citizenship with no additional fees. This allows them the opportunity to adopt more Americanized names. During the naturalization interview, a petition for a name change is prepared to be forwarded to a federal court. Applicants certify that they are not seeking a change of name for any unlawful purpose such as the avoidance of debt or evasion of law enforcement. Such a name change would become final if within their jurisdiction, once a federal court naturalizes an applicant.

=== Informal methods of legal name change ===
The "open and notorious" use of a name is often sufficient to allow one to use an assumed name. In some jurisdictions, a trade name distinct from one's legal name can be registered with a county clerk, secretary of state, or other similar government authority. Persons who wish to publish materials and not to be associated with them may publish under pseudonyms; such a right is protected under case law pursuant to the United States Constitution.

A common law name (i.e. one assumed without formality and for a non-fraudulent purpose) is a legal name. In most states, a statutory method, while quick and definitive, only supplements the common law method, unless the statute makes itself exclusive. A person may sue under a common law name.

In California the "usage method" (changing the name at will under common law) is sufficient to change the name. Not all jurisdictions require that the new name be used exclusively. Any fraudulent use or intent, such as changing the name to the same name as another person's name, may invalidate this type of name change.

Specifically in California, Code of Civil Procedure § 1279.5 and Family Code § 2082 regulate common law and court decreed name changes. Code of Civil Procedure § 1279.5 (a) reads, "Except as provided in subdivision (b), (c), (d), or (e), nothing in this title shall be construed to abrogate the common law right of any person to change his or her name." Subdivisions b through e preclude one from changing their name by common law if they are in state prison, on probation, on parole, or have been convicted of a serious sex offense. If a person is not in any of these categories, then a common law name change is allowed. (Family Code § 2082 also contains some of the same wording.)

=== Official registration ===
The legal name change process is usually different from simple usage and includes notifying various government agencies, each of which may require legal proof of the name change and that may or may not charge a fee. Important government agencies to be notified include the Social Security Administration (generally following statutory law, not common law), Bureau of Consular Affairs (for passports), the Federal Communications Commission, the Selective Service System and the Department of Motor Vehicles (for a new driver's license, learner permit, state identification card, or vehicular registration). Additionally the new name must be registered with other institutions such as employers, banks, doctors, mortgage, insurance and credit card companies. Online services are available to assist in this process either through direct legal assistance or automated form processing.

Most states require name changes to be registered with their departments of motor vehicles (DMVs) within a certain amount of time, and some state motor vehicle departments require updated social security cards to make changes, by first registering a new name with the Social Security office.

The fees for registering a new name vary from state to state. The forms, along with the state-specific requirements, can generally be obtained for free.

Many states will require reasons for wanting a name change. For example, in Florida, a court will not grant a petition for a change of name if it finds that (i) the petitioner has ulterior or illegal motives in seeking the name change, (ii) the petitioner's civil rights are suspended, or (iii) granting the name change will invade the property rights (e.g. intellectual property rights) of others.

=== Forcible name changes ===
In 1887, the Dawes Act directed that Indigenous Americans adopt a surname. This forcible solidification of individual identities, in pursuance of Western legal and political orders, assisted in the federal government's efforts to remove their ownership of communally-held land.

More recently, recipients of Deferred Action for Childhood Arrivals have been forced to revert to the names on their birth registration documents by USCIS, even where this does not match the name they have been using all their life in the United States. This is especially true with DACA recipients from Spanish-speaking countries, whereby two last names appear on birth registration documents per Spanish naming customs. Even where the person has only ever used one surname (typically that of the father), USCIS forces them to revert to both surnames, creating a discrepancy in matters such as academic records and credit ratings.

== Other common law jurisdictions ==
=== Australia ===
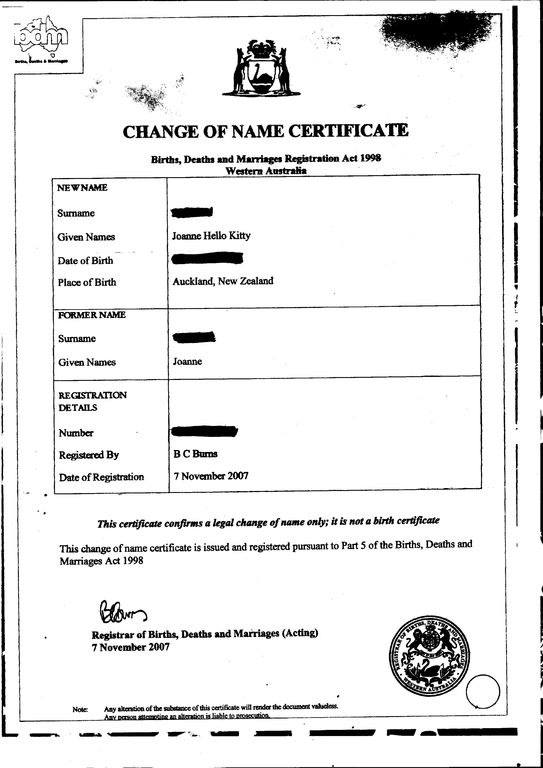
A Certificate of Change of Name issued by Western Australia

Individuals may legally change their name through the state and territory governments of Australia according to state or territory laws and regulations via agencies generally titled "Registry of Births, Deaths and Marriages". Exceptions exist for some states such as restricted persons (e.g. jail inmate) and in some states, changes may only be made once a year. A state/territory's RBDM typically has jurisdiction over changes of name for people born in that state or territory, and for people born overseas now residing in that state or territory. Residents born interstate must typically apply to the Registry of Births, Deaths, and Marriages (RBDM) of their birth jurisdiction for a change of name, though there are exceptions.

If a person's birth or adoption was registered in Australia, the change will also be noted (in most cases) on the person's birth or adoption registration, and in some states or territories, the name change can be evidenced either through a re-issued birth certificate if born in Australia and/or "Change of Name Certificate". Transgender residents born overseas may receive a recognised details certificate or identity acknowledgment certificate. These certificates are recognised secure identity documents and can be verified electronically through the Attorney-general of Australia's Document Verification Service.

=== India ===
In India, the person concerned submits a name change request to an appropriate authority, with supporting documents. Subsequently, an application must be made to the Government Printing Press, which issues an Official Gazette Notification certifying the change of name. In India, the name change legal process may be completed either publishing in either State Government Gazette or Central Government Gazette. There are four main steps involved in the name change procedure: First, the person has to make an affidavit on a Non-judicial stamp-paper and get notarised. Second, the name change must be published in a newspaper. Third, the required forms are filled in and affidavits are attached. A fee is paid to the government online. Finally the application is submitted. In certain states the gazette application may be submitted online but most of the states and Central Government have no online name change facility.

=== Hong Kong ===
It is a common practice for ethnic Chinese residents of Hong Kong to adopt a Western-style English name in addition to their transliterated Chinese name. As they often adopt Western-style English names after being registered on the birth register, the fact that they want to include a Western-style English name as part of their legal English name is regarded as a name change which usually requires a deed poll.

However, the Immigration Department which is responsible for processing applications for name change allows applicants to submit such applications without deeds poll; anyone who has a phonetic English name only and wishes to include a western-style English name as part of his or her legal English name can apply to the Immigration Department without a deed poll. Only one application of this kind is allowed for each applicant; any application for subsequent change(s) must be made with a deed poll.

=== Ireland ===
In the Republic of Ireland, a person earns their name by "use and repute". For most purposes it is enough to simply use the desired name and ask others to call you by that name. This was the traditional practice for a bride adopting her husband's surname. A change of name deed poll is not required, but provides documentary evidence of a name change. Resident non-EU nationals must apply to the Irish Naturalisation and Immigration Service for a deed poll. The deed poll requires a witness affidavit, and may optionally be enrolled in the High Court upon payment of stamp duty. An enrolled deed poll is required for some administrative name changes, such as on a driving licence or when changing legal gender.

There is a second option using an 'unenrolled' deed poll, this is a regular deed poll that is signed by yourself in the presence of a witness over 18. This can be used to update your name in banks, schools and other non-governmental institutions. This is the long process as the Irish Passport Office and NDLS require two years of 'proof of usage' e.g. bank statements in your new name dating back two years in order to change your name in comparison to a registered deed poll which allows you to change your name in the NDLS instantly along with DESAP.

=== Malaysia ===
Name changes in Malaysia are done at the local office of National Registration Department (JPN). Name changes for children require Malaysian identity cards (MyKad) of both parents, wedding certificates, birth certificate, and MyKid if exists. For name changes at will, a statutory declaration must be signed first, and the JPN.KP16 form is to be filled up at the JPN office.

=== New Zealand ===
From September 1995, New Zealanders can change their name by making a statutory declaration and, if approved, the new name is registered with the Births, Deaths and Marriages section of the Department of Internal Affairs (Identity Services). Prior to September 1995, they changed their name by deed poll.

== Civil law jurisdictions ==
In general, unlike in common law countries, names cannot be changed at will in civil law jurisdictions. Usually, a name change requires government approval, though legal name changes have become more common in some jurisdictions over the last years. The reason given for this system is usually the public interest in the unique identifiability of a person, e.g. in governmental registers, although with the advent of personal identification numbers, that rationale may be in need of reconsideration.

=== Belgium ===
Changes in law Aug 2018 changes first name and fee will fall under the authority of local town hall In Belgian law, a name is in principle considered fixed for life, but under exceptional circumstances, a person may apply to the Ministry of Justice for a name change. This requires a Royal Decree (French: Arrêté royal, Dutch: Koninklijk besluit) for last names, but only a Ministerial Decree for first names. The new name must not cause confusion or cause damage to the bearer or others. Examples of requests that are usually considered favourably:

- A person of non-European origin who wants to adopt a less exotic name to further their integration in Belgian society
- A person stuck with a ridiculous last name that is causing them great embarrassment or emotional distress. Actual examples include: Salami, Naaktgeboren ("born naked"), and Clooten ("sods of earth" in Middle Dutch, but "testicles" in modern Dutch)
- Following legal adoption or recognition of paternity (for minor children)

=== Brazil ===
In Brazil, legal name changes are regulated by the Public Records Act (Law No. 6,015/1973) and can be requested by any person registered on a Brazilian civil registry office, through a court order or directly on a civil registry office, depending on the case.

People over the age of majority (18 years) may change their given names without specifying a reason. The change of given name directly on a civil registry office can be done only once, and to revert the change, a court order is required.

A person's surnames can be changed directly on a civil registry office, in the following circumstances:

- inclusion of family surnames;
- inclusion of the spouse's or partner's surname following marriage or stable union;
- exclusion of the spouse's or partner's surname following divorce or extinction of a stable union;
- inclusion or exclusion of surnames following change of filiation;
- for stepchildren, the inclusion of the surname of the stepmother or stepfather, as long as there are justifiable reasons and consent from the stepparent whose surname is being included.

=== Indonesia ===
Unlike other countries, the legal procedures for name change in Indonesia are very complicated and costly. The photocopies of many personal documents are required, including a family register, an identity card, a marriage book, a diploma, a birth certificate, a land ownership certificate, a saving book, and a motor vehicle ownership book. Then, an order by local court is required to change the name. A minimum of two witnesses in the court are required. Changing a name in a birth certificate, especially of a minor, requires the photocopies of identity cards of both parents, and a letter of known birth.

However, correcting one's name spelling (i.e. inconsistent) is much easier, it is only required to bring personal documents with the correct one to the civil registry.

=== Netherlands ===
While name changes due to marriages performed in the Netherlands cannot be processed, it is certainly possible in the Netherlands to process name changes due to marriages performed outside the Netherlands, provided certain conditions are met: the marriage must be registered abroad, the application for name change abroad must be requested on the same date as the marriage date, the changed name must be recorded abroad on a certificate in accordance with the local rules of the foreign country, and the marriage and name change as well as proof of application as of the date of the marriage must be legalized/apostilled and provided to the Dutch consulate or Dutch municipality upon return to the Netherlands.

The reason is that international marriages are not necessarily governed by Dutch Law but by Private International Law which is codified in the Netherlands in the "Commoner's Law Book" (Burgerlijk Wetboek) Book No. 10, Private International Law, Title 2 – The Name, Article 24.

=== Norway ===
Although it has always been relatively easy to change one's legal names in Norway, it used to require some kind of government approval. As late as 1830, local vicars were instructed to write both given (Christian) names, as well as last names, in the baptismal record. Earlier, only the given name of the child, birth date, baptismal date, and sex were written down, alongside the parents' names. It was not until the beginning of the 20th century, however, that the authorities required everyone to adopt a family surname. Until about 1980, the government still required that a name change applicant apply to the government regional representative (fylkesmann). The law has been replaced twice since then. Nowadays, the process is as easy as in common-law countries; the subject merely submits the names wanted (providing that the surname chosen is not in use or is not used by fewer than 200 persons) to the local authorities for the purposes of election rosters and census counts; there is no longer an application process.

=== Philippines ===
2001 RA 9048 amends Articles 376 and 412 of the Civil Code of the Philippines, which prohibit the change of name or surname of a person, or any correction or change of entry in a civil register without a judicial order. Administrative Order No. 1 Series of 2001, implemented the law. It authorizes the city or municipal civil registrar or the consul general to correct a clerical or typographical error in an entry or change the first name or nickname in the civil register without need of a judicial order.

The first name or nickname on the civil register may be changed under any of the following circumstances:

- when the first name or nickname on the civil register is ridiculous, tainted with dishonor or extremely difficult to pronounce;
- when the new first name or nickname has been used habitually and continuously by the applicant and they have been publicly known by the new first name or nickname in the community; or
- when the change will avoid confusion.

==== Name and gender change ====
In case of controversial and substantial changes, Philippines jurisprudence requires full-blown court lawsuit, that must include the local civil registrar in the petition, since RA 9048 and Rule 108 (Cancellation or correction of entries in the Civil Registry) of the Rules of Court do not allow the change of sex in a birth certificate.

The only landmark case in the Philippines on name and legal sex change is the Jeff Cagandahan case. The Supreme Court of the Philippines Justice Leonardo Quisumbing on September 12, 2008, allowed Cagandahan, 27, who has congenital adrenal hyperplasia, to change the name on his birth certificate to read Jeff, and his legal gender to male.

=== South Africa ===
South Africa, which uses a mixture of common law and civil Roman Dutch law, mostly uses common-law procedures with regard to name change. Name changes in South Africa are regulated by the Births and Deaths Registration Act (Act 51 of 1992, as amended). The personal information of all citizens and permanent residents is recorded on the Population Register, so any name changes must be registered.

A person can change their forenames by submitting a form to the Department of Home Affairs. An individual's surname, or that of a family, may be changed by applying to the Department and providing a "good and sufficient reason" for the change.

A married woman can change her surname to that of her husband or join her maiden name with her husband's surname, and a divorced woman may return to her previous surname, without applying or paying a fee; but she must notify the department so that the details in the Population Register can be changed. (It is possible that, if challenged, these provisions might be held to be unconstitutional because they apply only to women.)

South Africa has officially recognized same sex marriages since 2006 and in doing so now allows one or both partners to change their surnames in the marriage register on the day of the marriage. A new passport and ID book can then be applied for with the new married surname as well.

The surnames of minor children can also be changed under various circumstances involving the marriage, divorce or death of a parent, children born out of wedlock, and guardianship.

=== Switzerland ===
In Switzerland, a name change requires the approval of the respective cantonal government, if there are important reasons (wichtige Gründe / justes motifs) for the change, according to article 30 of the Swiss Civil Code. When aliens apply for naturalization, they have the option of asking for their names to be changed upon the grants of citizenship with no additional fees. According to the case law of the Swiss Federal Supreme Court, such requests must be granted only if the petitioner shows that they suffer substantially from their present name, e.g. if it is the same as that of a notorious criminal.

=== Taiwan ===
In Taiwan, the Name Act bans changing one's legal name for some criminal reasons per Article 15 since 2015 (Article 12 since 2001). Otherwise, one may change the surname, given name, or both per Article 8, 9, or 10 since 2015 (Article 5, 6, or 7 since 1953, or Article 6, 7, or 8 since 2001).

Changing the given name is allowed if:

- Having the same name when serving or studying in the same institution or school.
- Since 1983, having the same given name as one's parent, grandparent, or great-grandparent.
- Having the same name as someone else who lives in the same county or city and having lived there for at least 6 months.
- Having the same name as a wanted criminal, for example 陳進興 (Chén Jìnxīng), a common name used by not only a convicted kidnapper and murderer who was executed in Taiwan for major crimes in 1997 (zh:陳進興 (台灣罪犯)) but also a Taiwanese statesman (Chen Chin-hsing).
- Since 2015, acknowledgement by father or adoption starts or ends.
- Having special reasons, which is limited to thrice since 2015 (twice since 2001) in one's lifetime, while the second given name change of this type requires the age of majority.

==== Replacing documents ====
Diplomas, work experience documents, licenses, permits, and other such documents shall use a person's legal name to avoid being deemed invalid, so those intending to change names have to note that:

Licensed Taiwanese driver who legally changes the name without reporting to the competent traffic authority is fined 300 to 600 new Taiwan dollars and asked to re-register the legal name.

Taiwan passports are to be replaced after having changed the names.

Registration of change in name of the right holder having been changed after a land right has been registered, shall be applied; the same shall apply to the change of the name of administrator.

==== Overseas application ====
A national without household registration may apply for name change outside Taiwan at a Taiwanese diplomatic mission, but having had household registration in Taiwan may apply there only to forward a name change application to the Household Registration Office covering the last Taiwanese address of residency, which is a better method only if no risk of discrepancies among Taiwanese documents, so anyone having considerable Taiwanese documents should still change the name in person at Taiwanese Household Registration Office, to also replace the National Identification Card, healthcard card, driver license, etc.

=== Israel ===
Israeli law determines that every adult over the age of 18 that does not have a guardianship can submit a request for a name change. A person who has changed their name cannot change it again until 7 years have passed, unless they have special approval from Minister of Interior. In case of adoption, the adopting family cannot change the child's name unless the court rules otherwise. In case of marriage, a person can change their last name, change back to their maiden name or add their spouse's last name to theirs at any time. A minor whose parents changed their last name gets the new last name of their parents, and a minor that one of their parents changed their last name to match the other parent gets the mutual last name. The minister is permitted to disapprove the new name if they believe the name may be misleading or offensive. The minister is not allowed to disapprove a name change if the name was chosen to accommodate Common-law marriage.

A minor who wants to change their first name may do this with a detailed reason for the change of name, along with consent from both their parents and verbal and written consent of the child. If the minor is under 10 years old, they need not come with the parents to change their name.

An adult convicted of a sex offense is not allowed to change their name as part of "the public protection law against committing sex offenses."

== Name change on religious conversion ==
Adherents of various religions change their name upon conversion or confirmation. The name adopted may not have any legal status but will represent their adopted religious beliefs.

=== Buddhism ===
- Individuals who attend a ceremony to officially become Buddhists are usually given a new "Dharma name", which marks their "taking refuge".

=== Christianity ===
- It has been historical Christian practice to adopt a name on baptism or (in some countries) confirmation.
- The customary practice whereby persons entering a religious institute take on a name in religion is still observed by Eastern Orthodox and some traditional Roman Catholics. Eastern Orthodox monastics are usually given the name of a prophet or a monastic saint.
- Popes take a papal name upon their accession to office; for example, Jorge M. Bergoglio adopted the name Francis.

=== Hinduism ===
There is no formal concept of conversion in Hinduism but converts to Hinduism are accepted, usually after a small ceremony called Shudhikaran (purification). Individuals who attend a Shudhikaran ceremony to officially become Hindu may be optionally given a new Dharma (religious) name, which is usually based on Sanskrit or Indian name such as names based on Hindu deities.

=== Islam ===
- Converts to Islamic faith may choose a new name; although it is not required, it may in some cases be preferable for personal reasons or because the name is of uncertain Islamicity (e.g. the person converting has a theophoric name in another religion, such as Christopher or Ganesh). Boxer Cassius Clay's adoption of the name Muhammad Ali is a well-known example, as is Cat Stevens' change to Yusuf Islam and Malcolm Little's adoption of the name Malcolm X and later El-Hajj Malik El-Shabazz. On the other hand, converts may choose to keep their names, as did Dave Chappelle.

=== Judaism ===
Jewish people in the Diaspora sometimes give their children two names: a secular name for everyday use and a Hebrew name for religious purposes. Converts to Judaism choose a Hebrew name. Full Jewish names include a patronym: converts take the patronym "ben/bat Avraham Avinu" (son/daughter of Our Father Abraham) as converts are held to be spiritual descendants of Abraham, the forebear of Jews.

== Preferred name ==
In the United States, many universities, hospitals, and other institutions allow one to use a "preferred name" instead of one's legal name. This name can show up on class rosters, online learning platforms, and student ID cards.

In Brazil, the use of a preferred name (known as social name; Brazilian Portuguese: nome social) for transgender people has been permitted on documents nationwide since 2017, through a decree by President Dilma Rousseff.

== See also ==
- Surname law
- Naming law
- Consciousness of guilt (illicit name change)
- Ellis Island Special
- Family name, including patrilineal surnames
- Given name
- Hornsleth Village Project
- In re McUlta
- Legal status of transgender people for information about name change for transgender and transsexual people
  - Diane Marie Rodriguez Zambrano, an activist who sued to enable legal name change in Ecuador for purposes of gender identity
- Married and maiden names
- Matriname
- Nickname
- Pseudonym
  - Pen name
  - Stage name
  - Nom de guerre
- Regnal name
- Salmon chaos, incident of mass name changes for a promotional event
- Witness protection
