= Trans man =

Man assigned female at birth

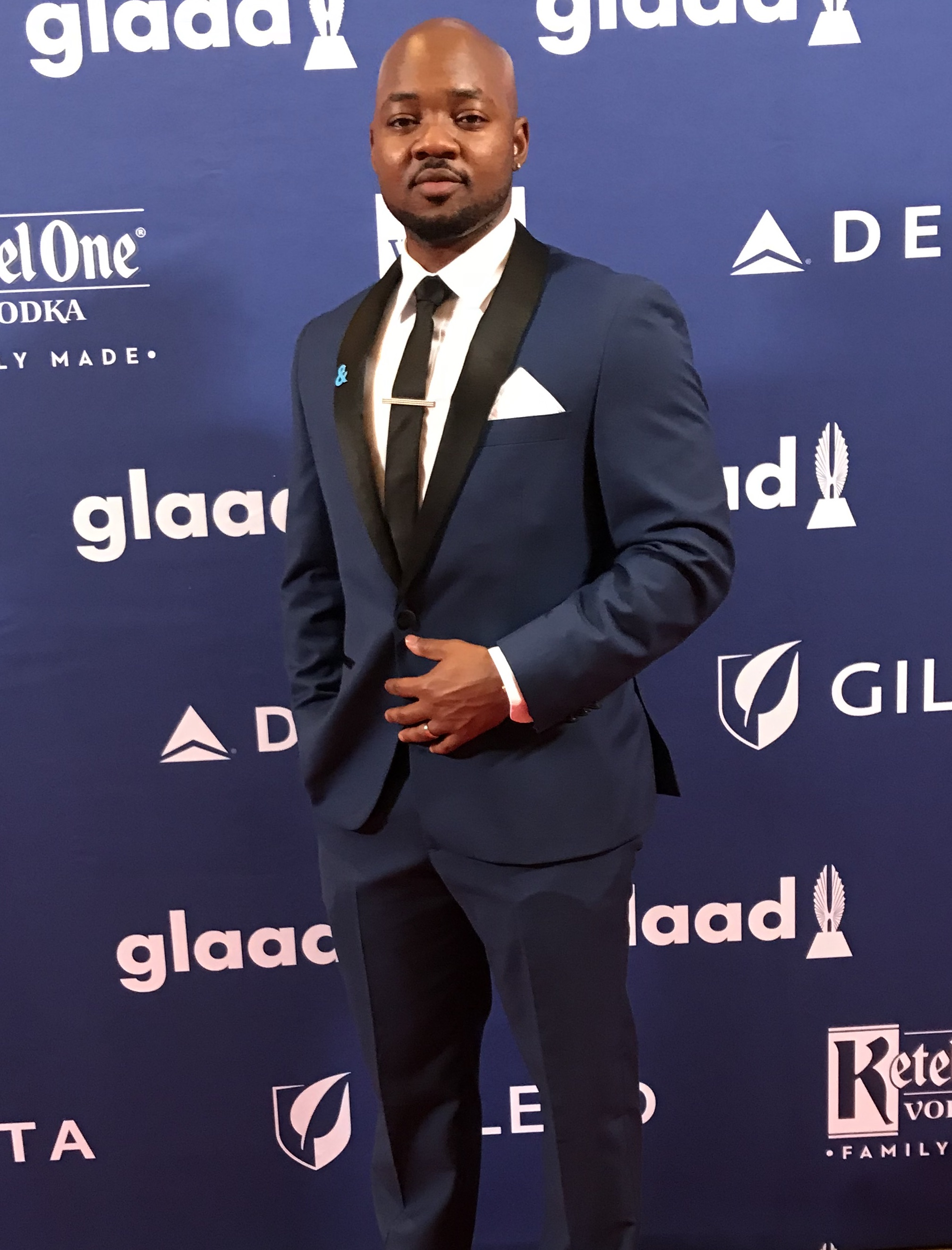
Brian Michael Smith, award-winning transgender actor

A trans man or transgender man is a man who was assigned female at birth. Trans men have a male gender identity, and many trans men undergo medical and social transition to alter their appearance in a way that aligns with their gender identity or alleviates gender dysphoria.

Transition among trans men can involve a variety of social, medical, and legal steps. Initially, the term referred specifically to those undergoing gender-affirming hormone therapy or gender-affirming surgery, (Note: The term sex reassignment surgery was initially used, but this is now generally known as gender-affirming surgery or gender-confirmation surgery) but its meaning has expanded to include psychological development and self-acceptance. While some trans men pursue medical interventions like hormones and surgery, others may opt out due to personal choice or financial constraints. Many who do not undergo top surgery use chest binding, and some employ packing to create a masculine shape. Transitioning can include social changes, such as adopting a new name and pronouns, legal name change or other document updates, and medical transition with HRT or surgery. Achieving social acceptance as male may be challenging without physical transition, and some trans men may selectively present as female in certain situations. Additionally, some transmasculine individuals may choose to become pregnant, give birth, and breastfeed.

Estimates of the prevalence of trans men in the U.S. vary widely, from 1 in 100,000 to 1 in 2,000. Census data for 2015 show around 58,000 name changes indicative of transition to male, though far fewer changed their sex coding. Trans men, like cisgender men, have diverse sexual orientations, with most identifying as heterosexual, but others as queer, pansexual, bisexual, gay, or asexual. Many trans men have past connections with the lesbian community, often identifying as butch lesbian before recognizing their transgender identity. While some date heterosexual or queer women, trans men face more challenges integrating into cisgender gay men's communities, which tend to be more body-focused. However, research challenges assumptions that trans men are predominantly heterosexual, showing a majority of non-heterosexual identities and rising acceptance within gay communities.

== Terminology ==
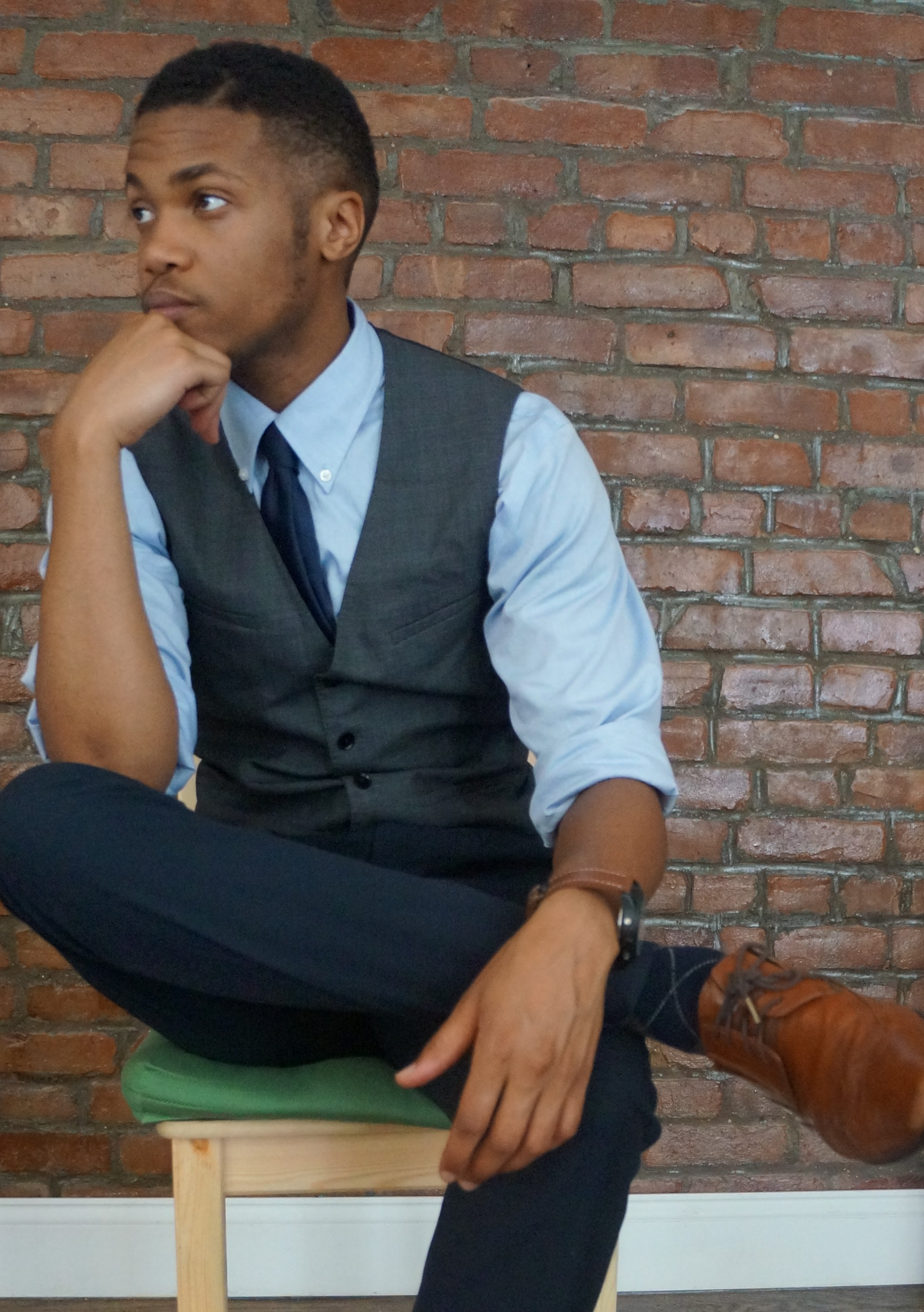
Kye Allums, who played women's basketball and is the first openly transgender NCAA Division I college athlete

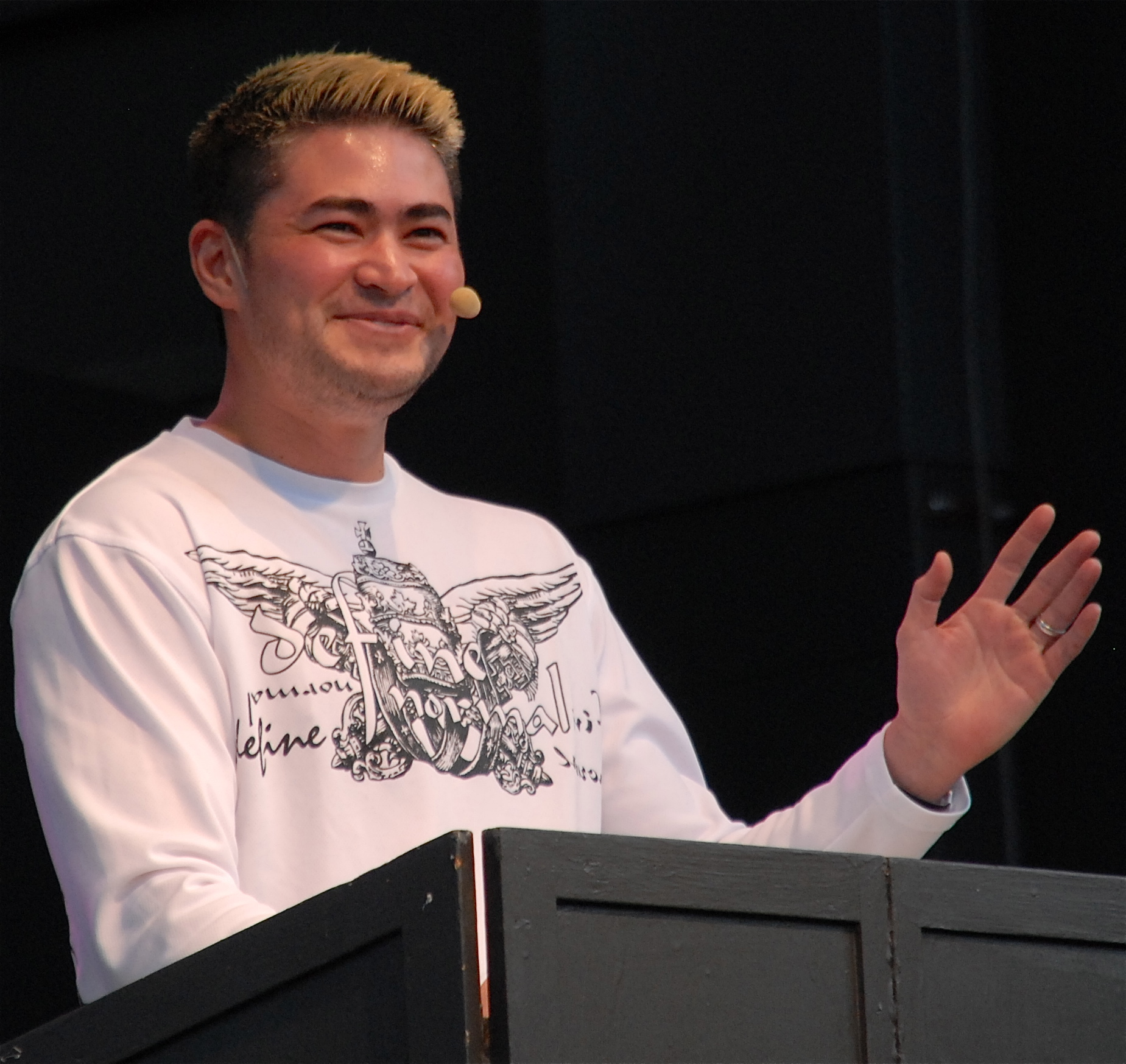
Thomas Beatie, an American public speaker, author, and advocate for transgender reproductive rights

The umbrella term trans (Note: occasionally spelled trans*, using the asterisk (*) as a wildcard character) is a shortening of both transgender and transsexual, and describes anyone whose gender identity does not align with their assigned sex.

The term transsexual originated in the medical and psychological communities, and is generally considered a subset of transgender, although the two are not always interchangeable. It predominantly describes people with medically diagnosed gender dysphoria, and who desire to permanently transition to the opposite sex via sex reassignment therapy. Many trans people prefer the labels transgender or trans, considering them more inclusive and less stigmatizing. However, others, such as Buck Angel, reject the label of transgender. The GLAAD media reference guide advises against describing people as transsexual, except for individuals who explicitly identify as such.

Transmasculine (sometimes clipped to transmasc) is a broader term for all trans individuals with predominantly masculine identities or gender expression, and includes trans men as well as non-binary people who were assigned female at birth and may have an identity that is partially masculine but not entirely male.

The alternate spelling transman is sometimes used interchangeably. However, like transwoman, it is often associated with trans-exclusionary views which hold that trans men are distinct from men, and thus require a separate word to describe them. For this reason many transgender people find the spelling offensive.

Another common term for trans men is female-to-male (FTM or F2M), but this is considered outdated by some, in part because it confuses sex and gender, or because someone may be nonbinary and lie somewhere on the spectrum between the two extremes, neither of which accurately describes them.

== Transitioning ==
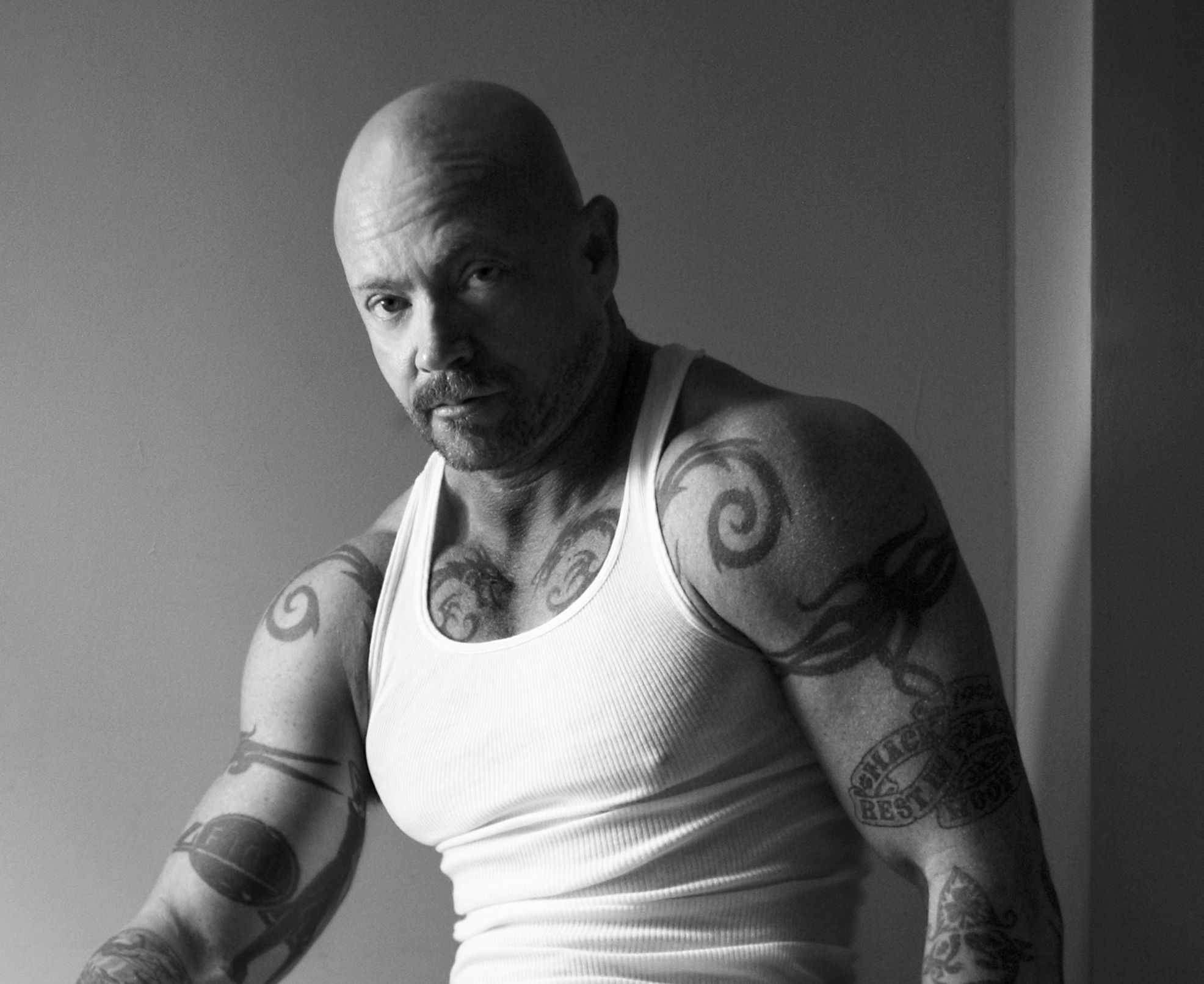
Buck Angel, an American actor, producer, and sex educator

Originally, the term trans men referred specifically to female-to-male transsexual people who underwent masculinizing hormone therapy or masculinizing surgery, or both. The definition of transition has broadened to include theories of psychological development or complementary methods of self-acceptance. Many of those who identify as transgender face gender dysphoria.

Transsexual and transgender men may seek medical interventions such as hormones and surgery to make their bodies as congruent as possible with their gender presentation. However, many transgender and transsexual men cannot afford or choose not to undergo surgery or hormone replacement therapy.

Many who have not undergone top surgery choose to bind their breasts. There are a few different methods of binding, including using sports bras and specially made binders (which can be vest-type, or wrap-around style). Tape or bandages are often depicted in popular culture.

Some trans men might also decide to pack, to create a phallic bulge in the crotch of clothing. However, this is not universal. Trans men who decide to pack may use anything from rolled up socks to specially made packers, which resemble a penis. Some packers are also created for trans men to be able to urinate through them (stand-to-pee, or STP, devices), or for sexual penetration or other sexual activity (known as "pack-and-play").

Transitioning might involve some or all of the following steps:

- Social transition: using a preferred name and pronouns, wearing clothing seen as gender appropriate, disclosure to family, friends and usually at the workplace/school.
- Sex reassignment therapy: masculinizing hormone therapy, and/or masculinizing surgery
- Legal affirmation: name and (sometimes) sex marker correction in legal identification documents.

Being socially accepted as male (sometimes known as passing) may be challenging for trans men who have not undergone HRT and/or surgery. Some trans men may choose to present as female in certain social situations (e.g. at work). After physical transition, trans men usually live full-time as male. However, some transmasculine individuals might choose to use and engage their bodies to be pregnant, birth a baby, and breastfeed.

== Prevalence, identity and relationships ==
In the United States, the ratio of trans men within the general population is unclear, but estimates range between 1:2,000 and 1:100,000. A U.S. Census Bureau study in 2015 suggests that there were around 58,000 name changes in census records consistent with female to male transitions although only 7,500 of these changed their sex coding as well.

Miriam J. Abelson writes, "There is no question that trans men's experiences are men's experiences and give insight about men, masculinity, and gender inequality."

Like cisgender men, trans men can have any sexual orientation or sexual identity, including heterosexual, gay, bisexual, asexual, and queer, and some trans men consider conventional sexual orientation labels inadequate or inapplicable to them. The literature commonly indicates that sexual attraction to those of their same gender (e.g., trans men liking men and trans women liking women) is considerably less common among trans men than among trans women; the majority of trans men are reported as heterosexual. Surveys from the National Center for Transgender Equality show more variation in sexual orientation or sexual identity among trans men. In NCTE's 2015 Transgender Survey of respondents who identified as trans men, 23% identified as heterosexual or straight. The majority (65%) identified their sexual orientation or sexual identity as queer (24%), pansexual (17%), bisexual (12%), gay/same-gender loving (12%), or asexual (7%).

Some trans men date heterosexual women, while other trans men date queer women; the latter might be because queer women are less invested in the gender and sexual anatomy of a person when it comes to selecting an intimate partner. It is also common for trans men to have histories with the lesbian community or to feel that they identify better with that community because of its wide acceptance of gender variance, with a number of trans men having previously identified as lesbian (often as a "butch lesbian") before realizing that they are instead transgender.

Trans men have less success integrating socially within cisgender gay men's communities, which tend to be more body-focused, especially in terms of being phallocentric. Yitzchak et al. state that, as a result, they more commonly see gay trans men partnering with each other than with cisgender gay men. There are, however, cases of women being likelier than men to thoroughly question trans men about their motivations for modifying their bodies.

Some scholars argue against assumptions that trans men are predominantly heterosexual and usually have lesbian histories. In scholars Dan Irving and Rupert Raj's book Trans Activism in Canada, researchers state, "There is still a common misperception that trans men are largely heterosexual amongst those who conflate gender identity and sexual orientation. It is frequently assumed that trans men are exclusively attracted to women and have lesbian histories prior to transition." They add, "Recent data from the Trans PULSE project (Bauer, Redman, Bradley, & Scheim, 2013) challenge this assumption, with 63 percent of female-to-male spectrum trans people in Ontario reporting non-heterosexual identities and/or past-year sex with trans or non-trans men." They also argue that, based on some research, "many non-trans gay men have welcomed trans men into gay communities and have increasingly recognized trans men as potential sexual and romantic partners."

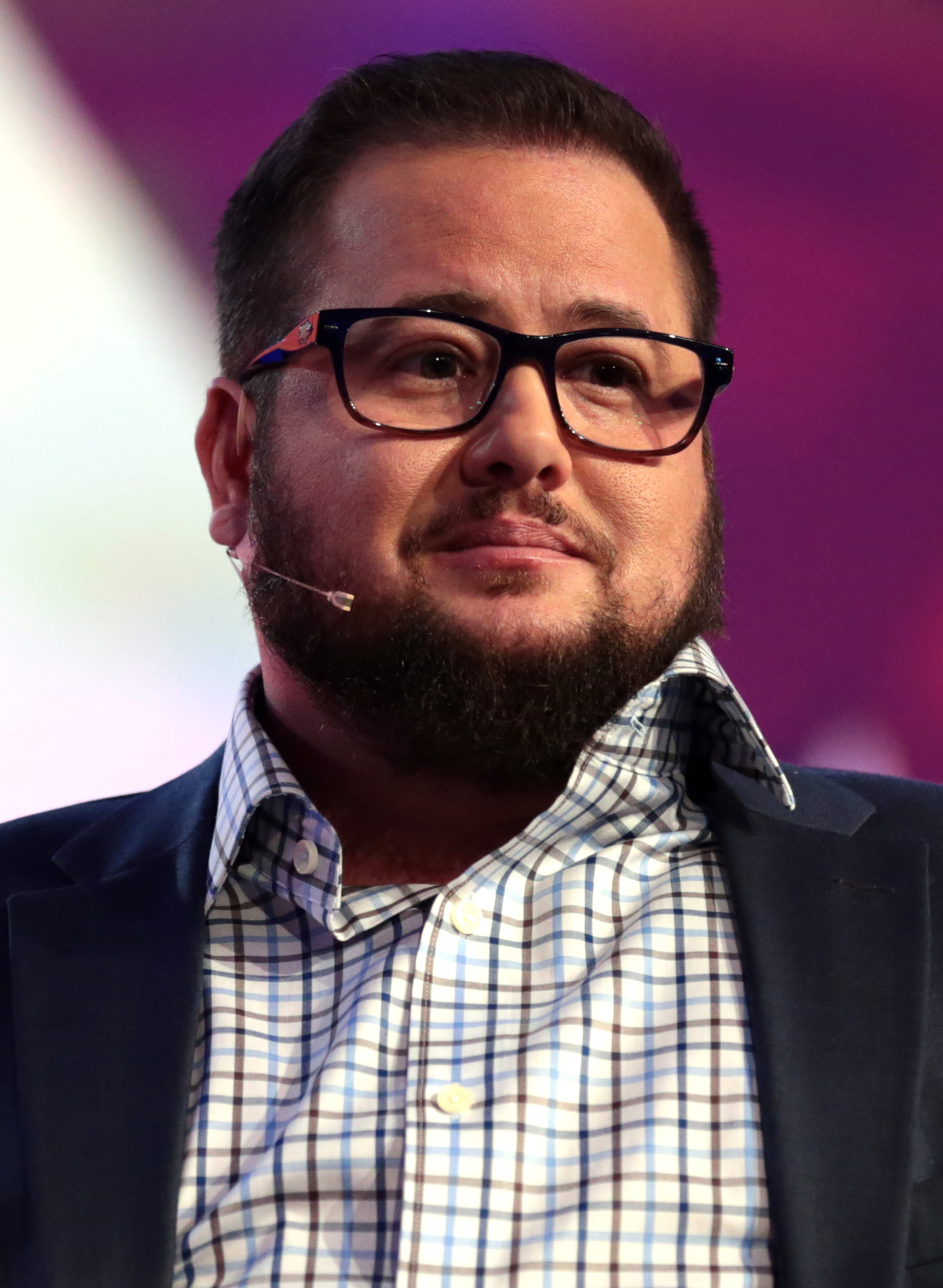
Chaz Bono, musician, writer and actor, whose parents are Cher and Sonny Bono

== Health ==
Trans men and transmasculine people often face difficulty and discrimination receiving medical treatment, due to both bias against assigned-female patients and against transgender people. In the 2015 U.S. Transgender Survey, 42% of 8,037 trans men reported negative experiences with healthcare providers. There is a lack of credible research about how to provide adequate healthcare to transmasculine people undergoing medical transition, notably with doctors having difficulty diagnosing breast cancer in people who have undergone top surgery.

=== HIV and AIDS ===
HIV infection between trans men and others is still increasing. Worldwide, 2.56% of transmasculine individuals are estimated to have HIV. They are seven times more likely to have HIV than the general population. However, HIV risk, prevention, and prevalence among trans men and transmasculine individuals is understudied. Trans men who have sex with men, trans male sex workers, and trans men who are the victims of corrective rape are at higher risk for HIV. Trans men may face healthcare discrimination while attempting to access HIV prevention, testing, and treatment.

=== Reproductive health ===
Trans men with an intact female reproductive system may become pregnant. According to surveys compiled by Medicare for Australia, 75 male-identifying parents gave birth in Australia in 2016, and 40 in 2017. Testosterone for trans men "is not a form of contraception"; although testosterone therapy eventually induces amenorrhea in most trans men, trans men with uteri are still at risk of pregnancy even if they no longer have periods. Additionally, trans men are likely to live in poverty and have inadequate access to healthcare, so many do not have access to the contraceptives they may want or need. Trans men can use barrier methods, oral contraceptives, IUDs, and other methods of contraception while taking testosterone.

Continuous testosterone use is contraindicated (not medically recommended) at the same time a trans man is attempting to conceive, pregnant, or while breastfeeding, because high levels of testosterone during pregnancy can possibly cause fetal abnormalities, specifically with the urogenital system of a female fetus.

Trans men experience issues during pregnancy not experienced by pregnant women. For example, trans men may experience discrimination on the base of their gender while receiving obstetric care. Many providers are unfamiliar with the needs of transgender patients. Additionally, some men report that being pregnant made their gender dysphoria worse.

=== Mental health ===
Discrimination has a significant impact on trans men's mental health. 44.9% of American trans men have attempted suicide during their lifetime. Among all trans Americans studied, those whose families do not support them, those who have experienced conversion therapy, those who report experiencing transphobic discrimination, those who have experienced physical or sexual violence, and those who have experienced intimate partner violence were more likely to have attempted suicide. Among American trans boys and young men, 59% have considered suicide and 22% have attempted suicide in the past year. Experiencing multiple ACEs is also correlated with poor mental health outcomes in this population.

== Sports ==
=== Trans men in women's sports ===
==== Early examples ====
Early known examples of trans men who competed at international levels were intersex men who were raised as girls, competed in women's championships, and came out as men later in life. They include Zdeněk Koubek, an intersex man who was Czech women's national champion and medal winner at the 1934 World Women's Athletic games in track whose awards and records were later revoked; Willy De Bruyn, a Belgian cyclist who became unofficial women's world champion in 1934, born intersex and raised as a girl but later identified as a man; and French sprinter Pierre Brésolles, who ran the women's 100 metre and 200 metre races and won third place in the women's 100 meter dash in the Oslo European Championship in 1946.

Another notable early trans man athlete is Andreas Krieger (b. 1965), an East German shot putter who competed on the women's East German athletics team at SC Dynamo Berlin in the 1980s. Krieger was unknowingly doped with large doses of anabolic steroids, which masculinized his body, influencing his decision to transition in the 1990s. He is now involved in anti-doping activism.

==== Recent examples ====
Keelin Godsey is an NCAA Division III record holder in women's hammer throw. In 2008, he became the first openly transgender athlete to compete for a spot on the United States Olympic team. Another Olympic team athlete, former member of Japan's Olympic women's fencing team from 2004 to 2006 Fumino Sugiyama, is now a transgender rights activist and works to promote acceptance and participation of trans athletes in Japanese sports.

In basketball, noted trans men include Jay Mulucha, an LGBTQI activist and Ugandan basketball player with the Magic Stormers in the Federation of Uganda Basketball League (FUBA), and American basketball player Kye Allums, the first openly transgender NCAA Division I college athlete. Harrison Browne was the first openly transgender athlete in professional American hockey, coming out in 2016 and transitioning medically after his retirement from professional sports in 2018. Kumi Yokoyama is a Japanese footballer who plays as a forward for women's football club Okayama Yunogo Belle and the Japan women's national team.

==== Safety concerns ====
In 2017, high school state wrestler and trans boy Mack Beggs won the Texas state girls' wrestling title. Beggs began taking testosterone to transition in 2015, which other athletes argued gave him an unfair advantage and created a safety risk. He reached the state championship tournament after two opponents forfeited matches due to safety concerns, and a lawsuit was filed to suspend Beggs because of testosterone use. Beggs' mother stated that he wanted to compete in the boys' competition but was barred due to rules requiring that athletes compete according to the sex on their birth certificate.

Transgender men athletes in women's sports
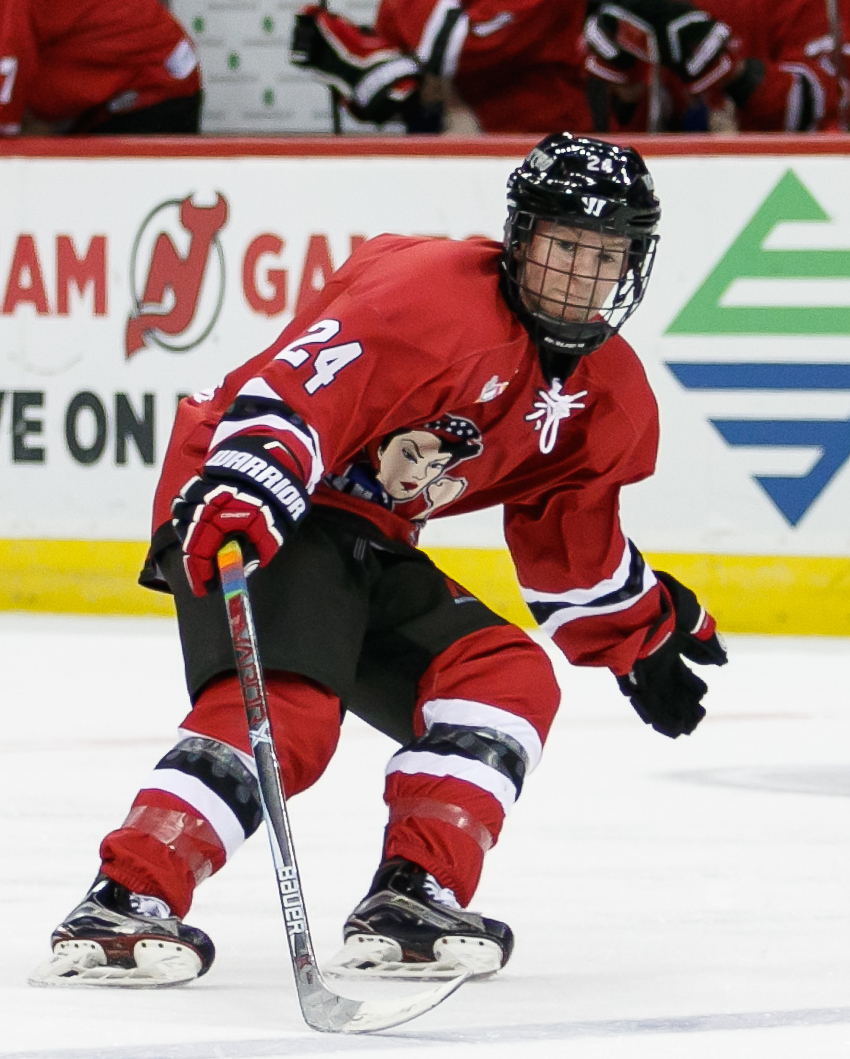
Harrison Browne, Canadian ice hockey player

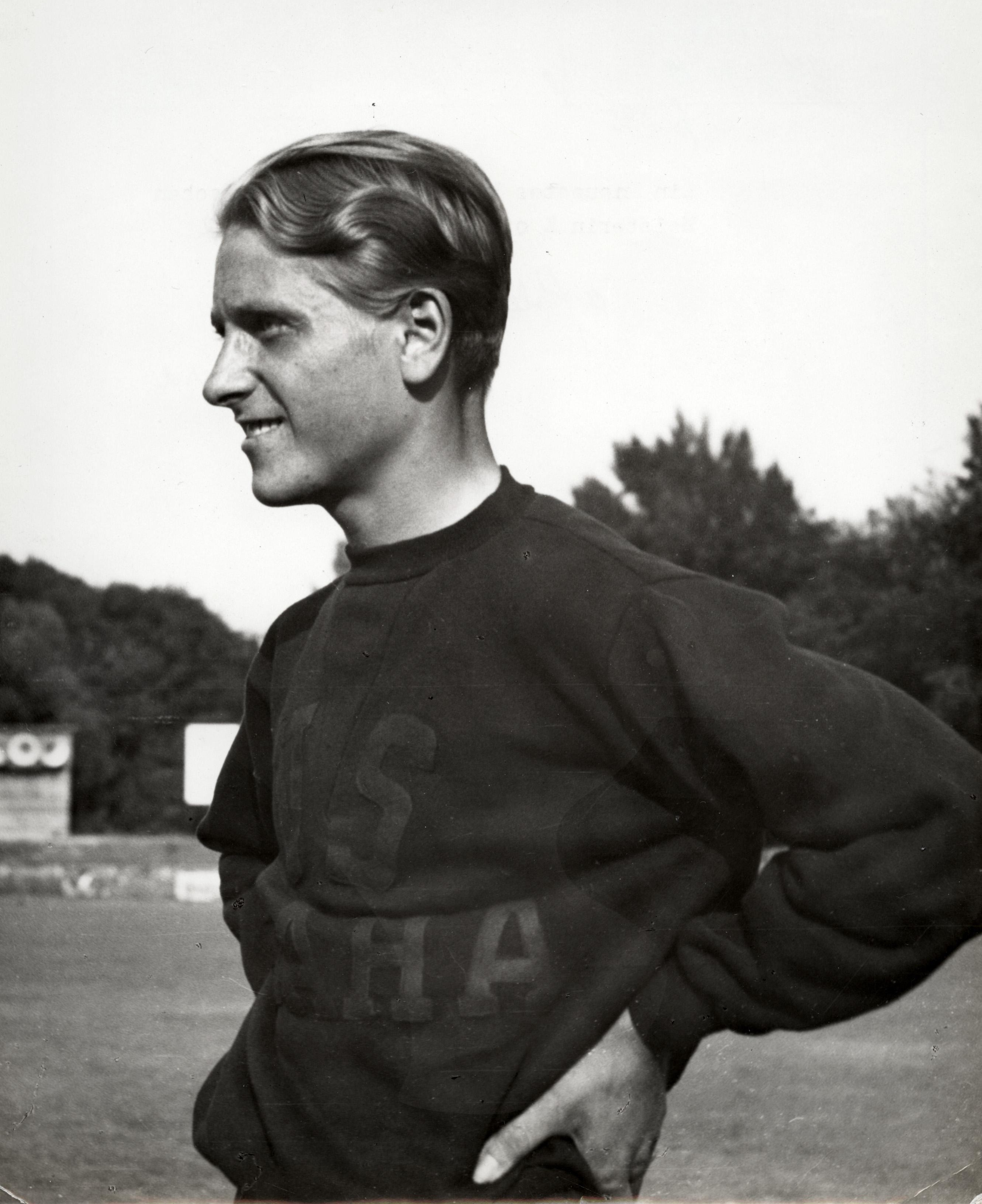
Zdeněk Koubek, Czech intersex man who was a women's track champion (1936)

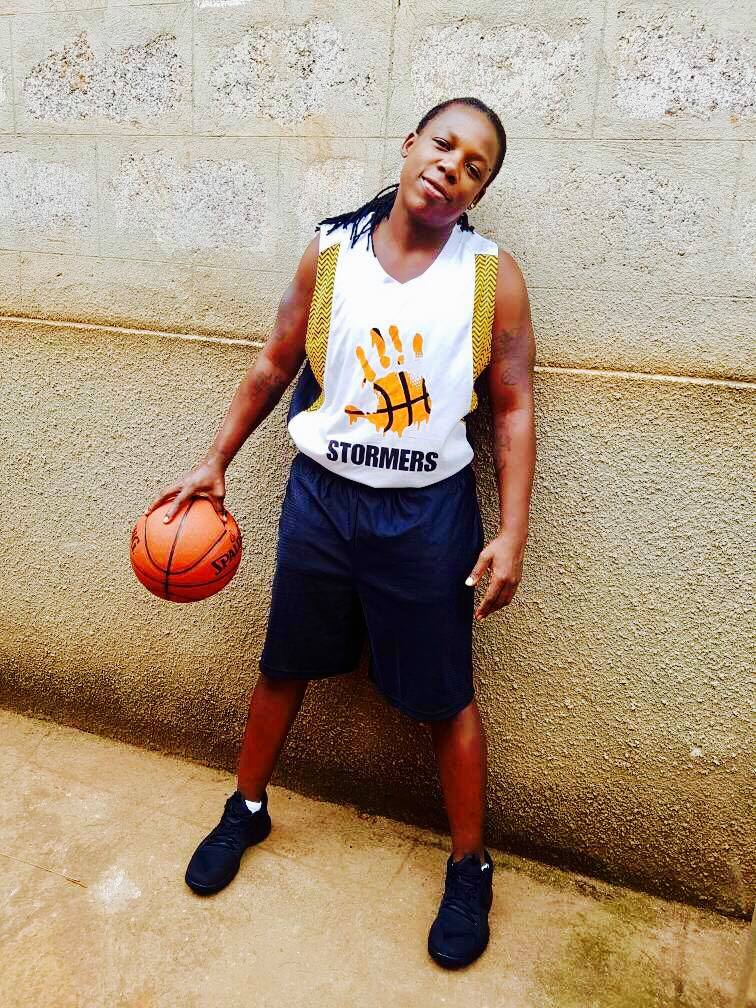
Jay Mulucha, Ugandan basketball player

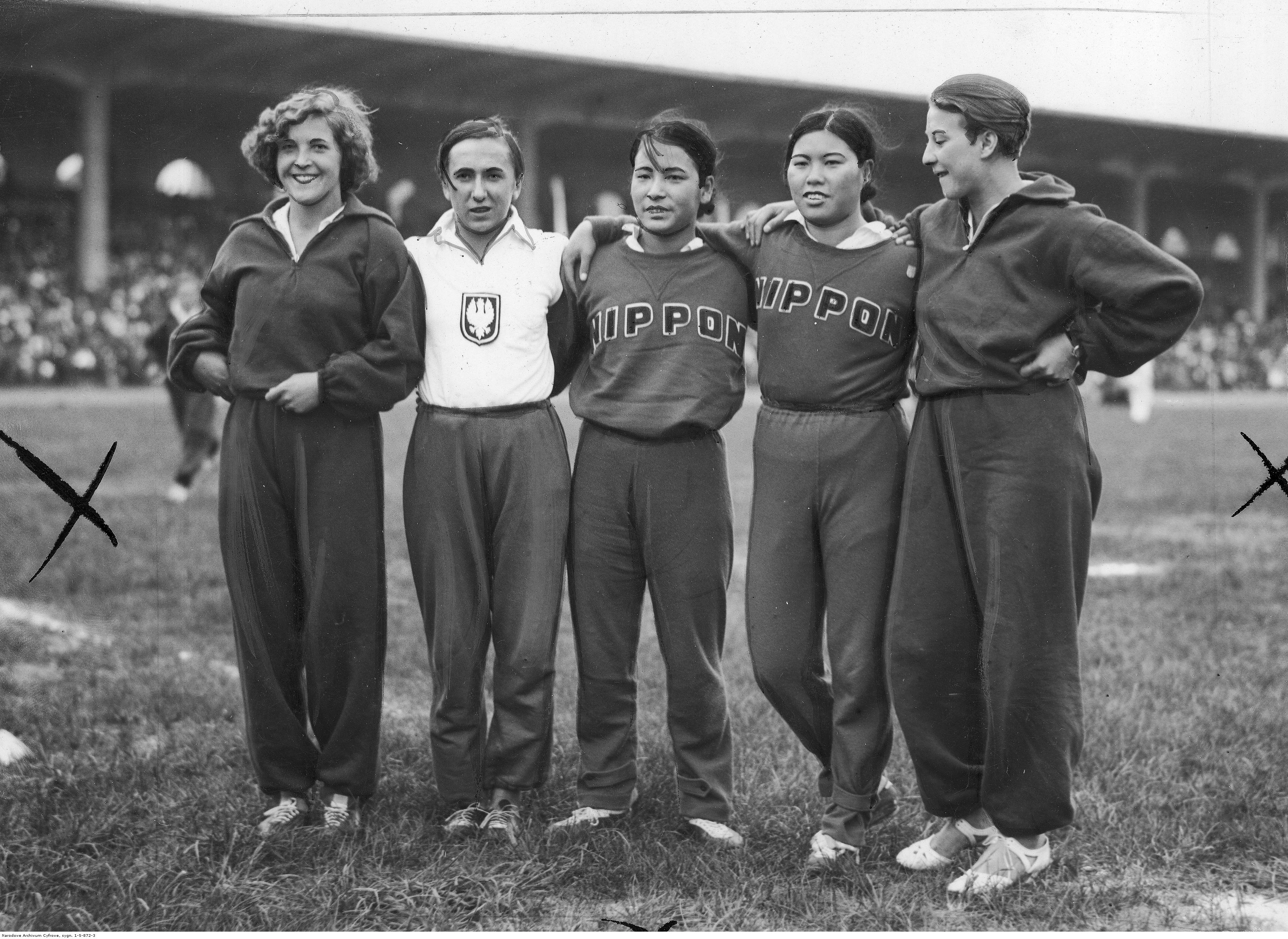
Witold Smętek, Polish intersex man and track competitor (in white) (1934)

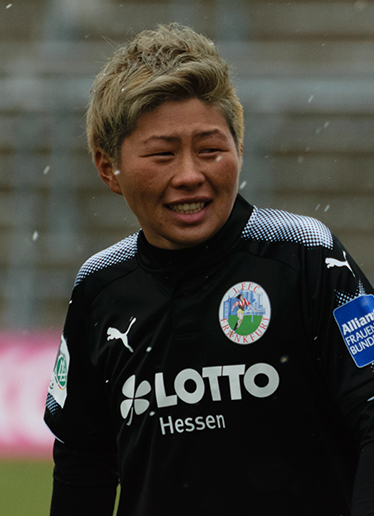
Kumi Yokoyama, Japanese professional soccer player

=== Trans men in men's sports ===
In 2013, Schuyler Bailar was recruited to the Harvard women's swimming team. He took a gap year after high school to transition, and was told he could join the men's or women's swim team at Harvard, according to his preference. He joined the men's team, and in 2015 Bailar became the first publicly documented NCAA D1 transgender man to compete as a man in swimming.

More recently, Chris Mosier, a duathlon and triathlon competitor on the US National team in duathlon, successfully challenged the International Olympic Committee former policy that required surgery before transgender athletes could compete in the category that matched their gender identity. Mosier's challenge led to the creation and adoption in 2016 of new IOC guidelines for the categorization of transgender athletes in the Olympics in World Championships.

In 2018, American Patricio Manuel became the first trans man to compete in professional men's boxing.

Transgender men athletes in men's sports
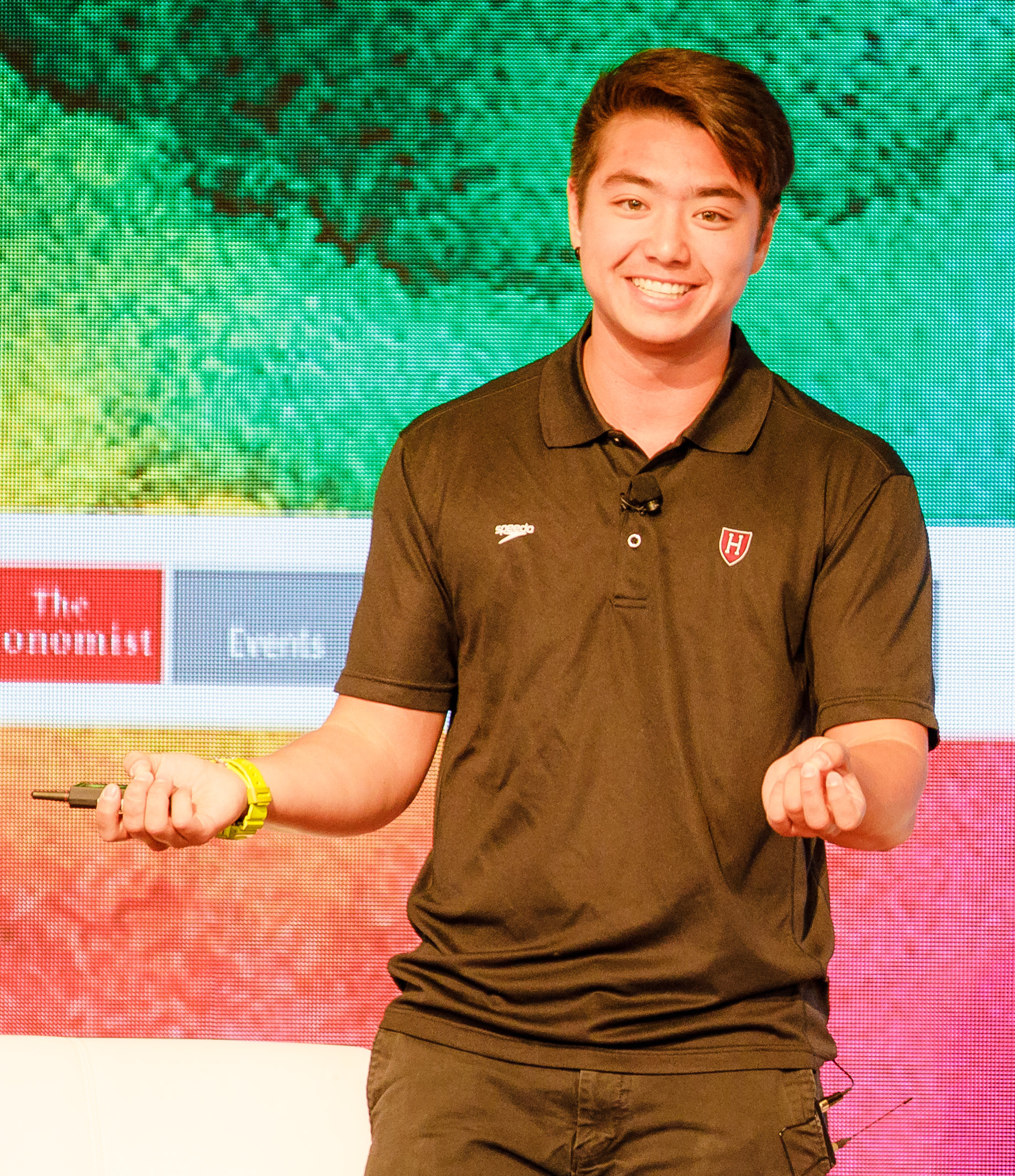
Schuyler Bailar, men's swimmer for Harvard from 2015 to 2019

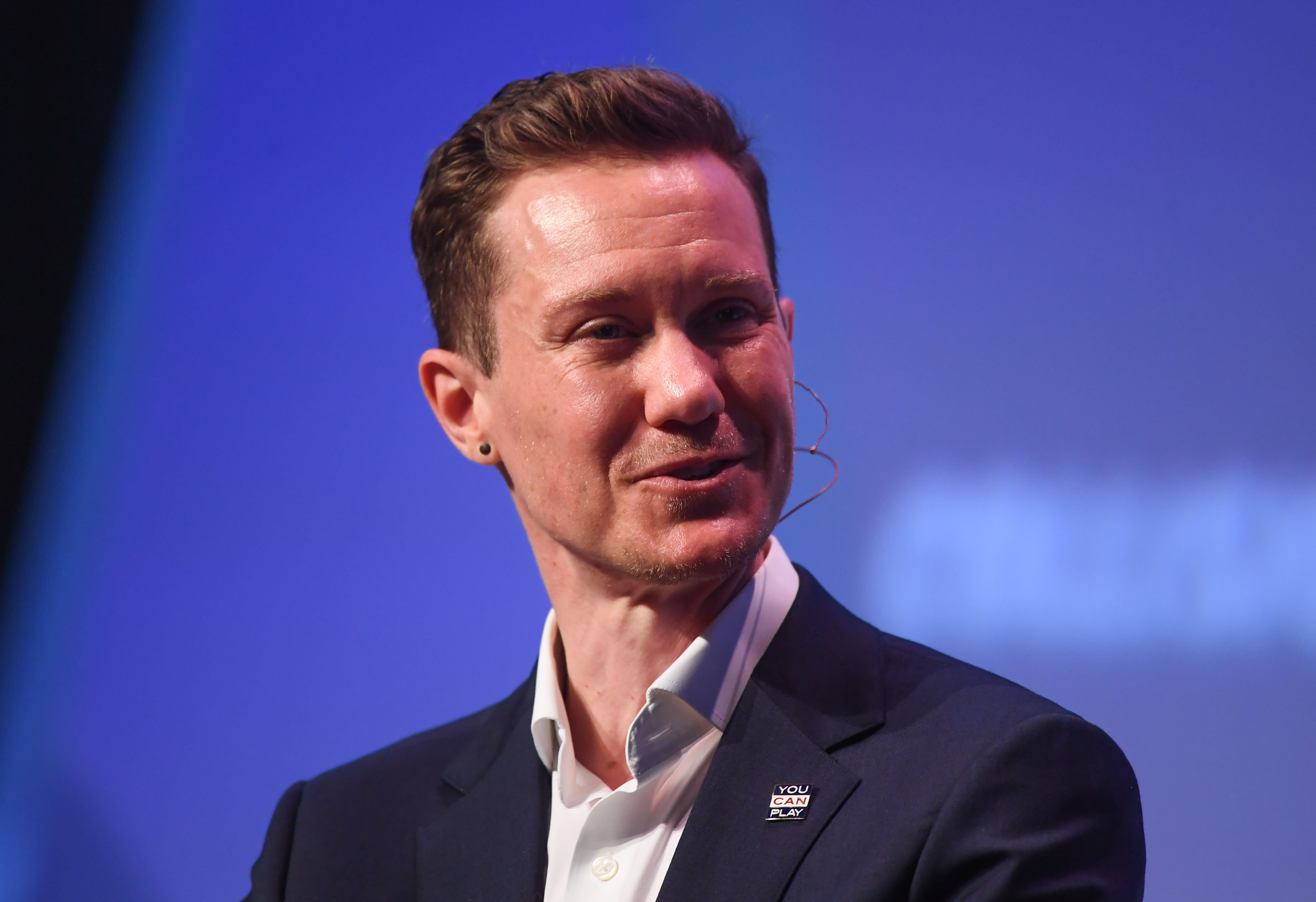
Chris Mosier, men's triathlete, duathlete and racewalker

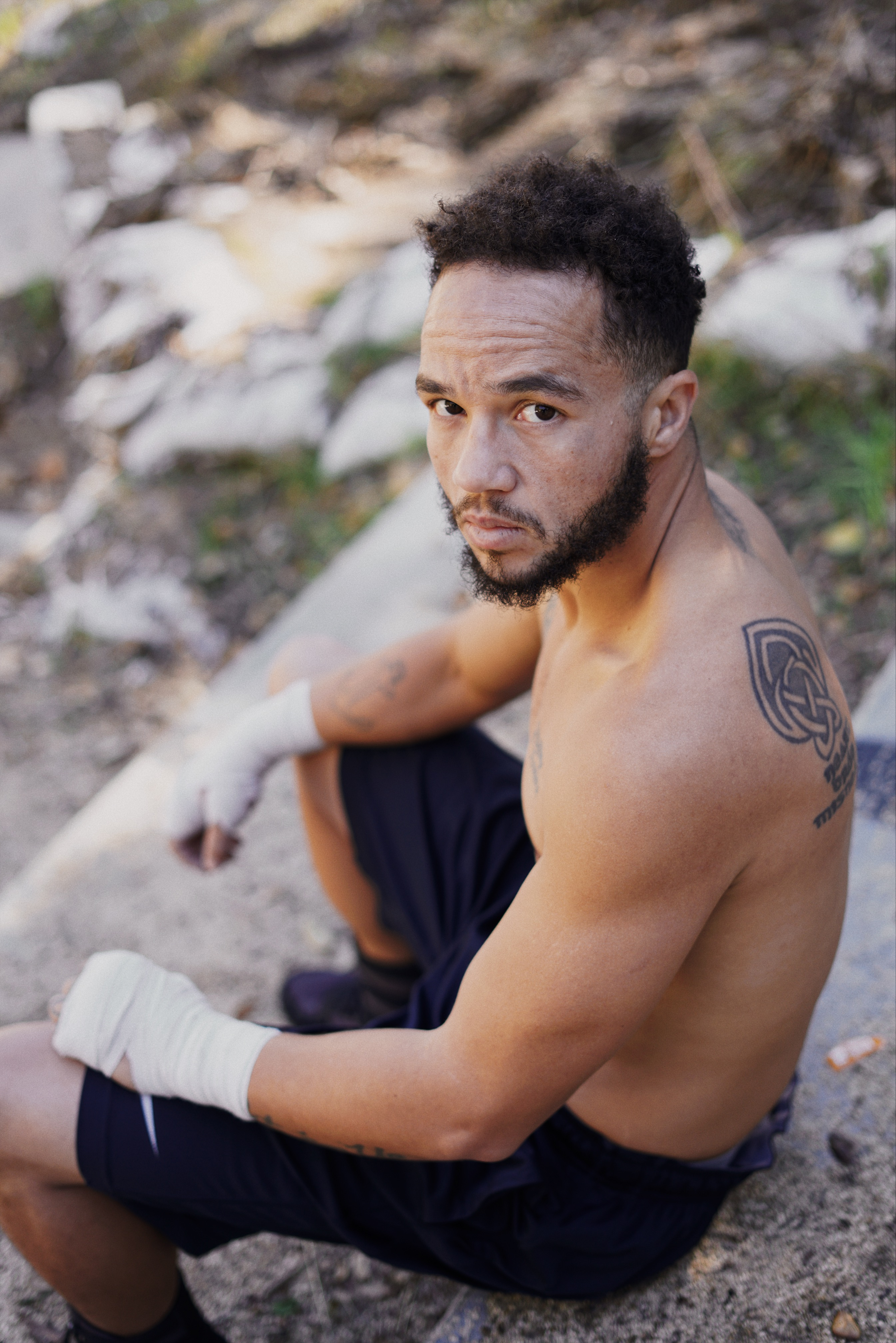
Patricio Manuel, American professional boxer who competed in men's boxing after transition

=== Trans men in mixed sex sports ===
Quince Mountain was the first transgender dog musher to compete in the Iditarod dogsledding race in 2020.

== Discrimination ==
Transgender men, like all transgender people, face significant discrimination worldwide, especially those who are not perceived as cisgender. Generally, there is less research into trans men's experiences than those of cisgender LGB people or trans women, which can make it difficult to find data on the discrimination they face. The experiences of trans men in low- and middle-income countries are also understudied compared to those of trans men in high-income countries.

Discrimination saturates all areas of transgender men's lives. The 2011 National Transgender Discrimination Survey, an American survey with responses from 1,687 trans men, investigated transgender people's experiences with discrimination. It found that, among trans men:

- 65% reported harassment, bullying, or expulsion at school
- 33% had been physically assaulted and 8% had been sexually assaulted at a K-12 school
- 19% lost their job because of their gender identity
- 50% reported harassment in the workplace
- 20% have been refused healthcare because of their gender identity
- 42% delayed needed medical care because of discrimination
- 40% said that parents or other family members stopped speaking to them after they came out as trans
- 51% of those who accessed homeless shelters report being physically assaulted at the shelter
- 25% report being denied equal treatment at government agencies
- 26% report being harassed by police and 6% report being physically assaulted by police

Public bathroom access is an issue. In one study, Peruvian trans men report being harassed and filmed in public bathrooms. In many parts of the world, bathroom bills restrict which bathroom transgender people can use.

Documentation is an issue for transgender people. In many countries, trans people may face difficulties changing their name and gender marker on legal documents such as IDs, passports, and birth certificates. Trans men whose presentation does not match their identity documents may face discrimination. One Puerto Rican trans man reports being detained and forced to undress by immigration personnel at an airport in the Dominican Republic because his identity documentation did not match his appearance.

Trans men are more likely to participate in sex work than are cisgender people. Around 13% of American trans men participate in sex work. In Uganda, trans men report being denied employment or being fired because of their gender identity. This makes them more likely to engage in sex work.

=== Healthcare ===
Transgender people, including trans men, experience discrimination in a variety of different healthcare settings and across healthcare specialties. Trans men in particular may face discrimination when seeking care in the realm of obstetrics and gynecology.

Although trans men are at elevated risk for HIV acquisition compared to the general population, there is little research into trans men and HIV. Trans men may be miscategorized in studies or excluded entirely. Although many trans men are eligible for PrEP to prevent HIV, few take it, in part due to provider discrimination at sexual health clinics. In one study of trans men who have sex with men (MSM) in France, participants reported that doctors did not take their concerns about HIV seriously because they were transgender. Trans people, including trans men, report being refused HIV services in Nigeria.

Trans men especially experience discrimination in specialties traditionally considered to be "women's healthcare," such as obstetrics and gynecology. Trans men are less likely than cisgender women to get screened for cervical cancer, largely due to issues of provider discrimination and gender dysphoria. In Bhutan, a study of 124 trans men found that 47.6% of them reported healthcare discrimination because of their gender identity. French trans men reported that doctors at sexual health clinics did not meet or address their contraceptive needs.

In particular, trans men who give birth face discrimination from medical providers and nurses. One American trans man told researchers that that "Child Protection Services was alerted to the fact a 'tranny' had a baby" after he gave birth in a hospital. Another Swedish trans man was forced to wait in the emergency department during premature labor because staff did not think a man could be pregnant. In extreme cases, trans men have died after being denied medical care, such as Robert Eads, an American man who died after being refused treatment for ovarian cancer.

Trans men may also face discrimination in psychiatric facilities. One American trans man reports that he was placed in a room with female patients during a psychiatric admission. Staff called him by his deadname and feminine pronouns, then refused to provide him with menstrual products because he was a man. Doctors did not allow him to take testosterone during his hospital stay, claiming that it had caused his symptoms. If a trans man has symptoms of mental illness, psychiatrists may blame testosterone and stop patients from taking it, even though there is no evidence that testosterone causes mental illness.

=== Violence against trans men ===
Transgender men face high rates of violent crime and physical assault. One American study estimated that trans men and other trans people assigned female at birth experienced 107.5 violent crime victimizations per 1,000 persons, similar to the rate for trans women and much higher than that for cisgender women and men. Among American trans boys, 55% have been physically threatened or harmed because of their gender identity. 10.5% of Bhutanese trans men have been physically assaulted because of their gender identity.

Many trans men experience domestic violence. Trans men surveyed about their domestic violence experiences in Turkey report being strangled and beaten with lengths of pipe by family members for their gender identity. One American study found that 91.6% of transmasculine individuals studied had experienced at least once adverse childhood experience (ACE). 45% of the sample had experienced four or more ACEs. Trans men are also extremely vulnerable to intimate partner violence, or IPV. A systematic review of studies from primarily Western countries found that a median 37.5% of trans people had ever experienced physical abuse from an intimate partner and 25% had ever experienced sexual abuse from an intimate partner. There was no significant difference between trans people assigned female at birth and trans people assigned male at birth.

Trans men may be at greatest risk of experiencing IPV when they first begin to medically transition, especially when dating partners who do not support their transition. They may experience physical, sexual, and psychological abuse in intimate relationships. Additionally, trans people may also experience domestic violence specific to their transgender identity. For example, some trans men do not have vaginal sex because it causes them gender dysphoria. A trans man's abusive partner may force him into vaginal sex to induce dysphoria. If a trans man seeks help from police or domestic violence services, he may experience transphobic discrimination. In the United States, domestic violence shelters admit only 55% of transgender men seeking help.

Corrective rape affects trans men worldwide. Attorney Sarah Doanh-Minh argues that corrective rape against transgender men aims to denigrate them and deny their male identity. Multiple Ugandan trans men shared their experiences with corrective rape in one 2021 study; one developed HIV infection as a result of the assault. One participant was raped at age 13, and was told by a family member, "You climb so many trees, you ride bicycles like men, it's good you have been raped." The child's family did not allow him to seek medical care after the rape.

Abusive partners and rapists can threaten trans men with forced pregnancy, which serves to demonstrate control over the victim's body, tie the victim to the abuser, and force the victim to stop or delay gender-affirming care. In two cases in Thailand, transgender men who became pregnant as the result of rape were forced to marry their rapists.

== See also ==
- Trans woman
- List of transgender people
- List of transgender-related topics

== Bibliography ==
- Davis, Gianna E. (2022). "Intimate Partner Violence in the Lives of Gay, Bisexual, and Transgender Men". In Bates, Elizabeth A.; Taylor, Julie C. (eds.). Domestic Violence Against Men and Boys: Experiences of Male Victims of Intimate Partner Violence. Routledge. ISBN 978-1-003-08961-2.
- Grant, Jaime M.; Mottet, Lisa A.; Tanis, Justin; Harrison, Jack; Herman, Jody L.; Keisling, Mara (3 February 2011). "Injustice at Every Turn: A Report of the National Transgender Discrimination Survey". National Gay and Lesbian Task Force. National Center for Transgender Equality.
- Peitzmeier, Sarah M.; Malik, Mannat; Kattari, Shanna K.; Marrow, Elliot; Stephenson, Rob; Agénor, Madina; Reisner, Sari L. (2020). "Intimate Partner Violence in Transgender Populations: Systematic Review and Meta-analysis of Prevalence and Correlates". American Journal of Public Health. 110 (9): e1–e14. doi:10.2105/AJPH.2020.305774. PMC 7427218. PMID 32673114.
- Pignedoli, Clark; Rivest, Paul (2024). "The gender of PrEP: Transgender men negotiating legitimacy in France". Social Science & Medicine. 348 116842. doi:10.1016/j.socscimed.2024.116842. PMID 38593613.
