= Kristian von Hornsleth =

Danish conceptual artist (born 1963)

Kristian von Hornsleth (born 1963) is a Danish conceptual artist, painter, sculptor, political activist, performance artist and filmmaker.

== Art projects ==
=== Hornsleth Village Project ===
Hornsleth became world famous for his controversial Hornsleth Village Project in 2006, wherein 100 Ugandan villagers were paid in livestock to legally change their names to Hornsleth, as a comment on first world hypocrisy, unfree trade and dominance of the third world. The project slogan is: "We want to help you, but we need to own you". A documentary film made by national Danish TV is available on Youtube.

=== H.A.I.C. ===
In 2008 Hornsleth launched his Hornsleth Arms Investment Corporation H.A.I.C., which is a real functional shareholder company, registered in Denmark. The H.A.I.C. company has 100 owner shares, and each share is a physical painting. The project aims to explore the double standards in political correct investment policies, as people who wish for fews guns and less war in the world, often already have their pension funds in arms investments. The project slogan is: "We want to protect you, but we need to scare you".

=== The Langland school Massacre Project ===
From 2009, is a re-enactment of a fictional school shooting and consists of 100 controversial photographs and a film, which Hornsleth produced in collaboration with the students from the Danish boarding school Langelands Efterskole.

=== Deep Storage Project ===
In 2011, Hornsleth initiated his Deep Storage Project. This project is a comment on modern life atheistic thought of a possible afterlife. A film and a three year performance where Hornsleth and his team traveled around the world taking DNA samples from 4000 people. While collecting issuing art work certificates, with the over all idea to place

=== Rolex Project ===
The Rolex Project initiated in 1998, and published in Flash Art Magazine, Hornsleth invited Rolex watch owners to have their watch engraved with the text Fuck You Art Lovers with a Hornsleth signature and a unique serial number. The project is thought to be a discussion of the perverse power of luxury brand investment. The owner receives a photograph of the engraved watch along with the watch. The plan is to reach 100 watches and so far in 2023 over 36 watches has been 'upgraded or destroyed'.

=== 2026 election and subsequent arrest ===
For the 2026 Danish general election, Hornsleth supported the Red–Green Alliance and offered voters an artwork worth 1500 DKK in exchange for voting for the party. As a result, he was arrested by Copenhagen's police department under the Danish Penal Code §117 4-5 for bribing voters.

== Education ==
He graduated with a master's degree in 1994 from The Royal Academy of fine Arts, department of Architecture
