= In re McUlta =

United States ruling establishing name changes as a legal right

In re McUlta, 189 F. 250 (M.D. Pa. 1911), is one of several precedent-setting US federal court rulings that clearly defined and established common law name changes as a legal right.

The case stems from Truman Day McCleas moving from New York State to Pennsylvania. In Pennsylvania, he assumed, by common law, at will, the name of "J. D. McUlta", and then went bankrupt after several years of doing business under that name.

The ruling states that even if a court is granted permission to change a name by petition and decree, that permission does "not change the common-law rule that a man may lawfully change his name at will and will be bound by any contract into which he enters under his adopted or reputed name, and that he may sue and be sued in that name". Explicitly, a common law name change carries the same legal weight as a court-decreed name change. The ruling also uses term of art "at will", clarifying that common law allows name changes "at will" and no court-issued order of name change is required.

This case is also precedent that a person's name is irrelevant in regard to the person; rather, it only indicates the person. One may change one's name by common law, but the existence of that person does not change:

This exception charges the bankrupt with fraud in obtaining the goods and merchandise purchased, in that he did not inform his creditors of his right name, and therefore he did not obtain title to the goods which he claims as exempt. We dismiss this exemption. A name is used merely to designate a person or thing. It is the mark or indica to distinguish him from other persons, and that is as far as the law looks. In re Snook, supra; Rich v. Mayer (City Ct. N. Y.) 7 N. Y. Sup. 69, 70. They are merely used as means of indicating identity of persons. Meyer v. Indiana National Bank 27 Ind. App. 354, 61 N. E. 596. There is nothing in the evidence to show that any fraud was committed by the bankrupt in purchasing the goods. They were sold to him under his assumed name (the creditors never knew until after the institution of bankruptcy proceedings and the adjudication, that the bankrupt was doing business under an assumed name;) and he took title of the goods and could have disposed of them under his assumed name and given a good title to the same. Credit in this case was given to the man—not the name—and that man was J. D. McUlta.

— District Judge Witmer, In re McUlta, 189 F. 250 (1911),
