= Jay Mulucha =

Ugandan basketball player

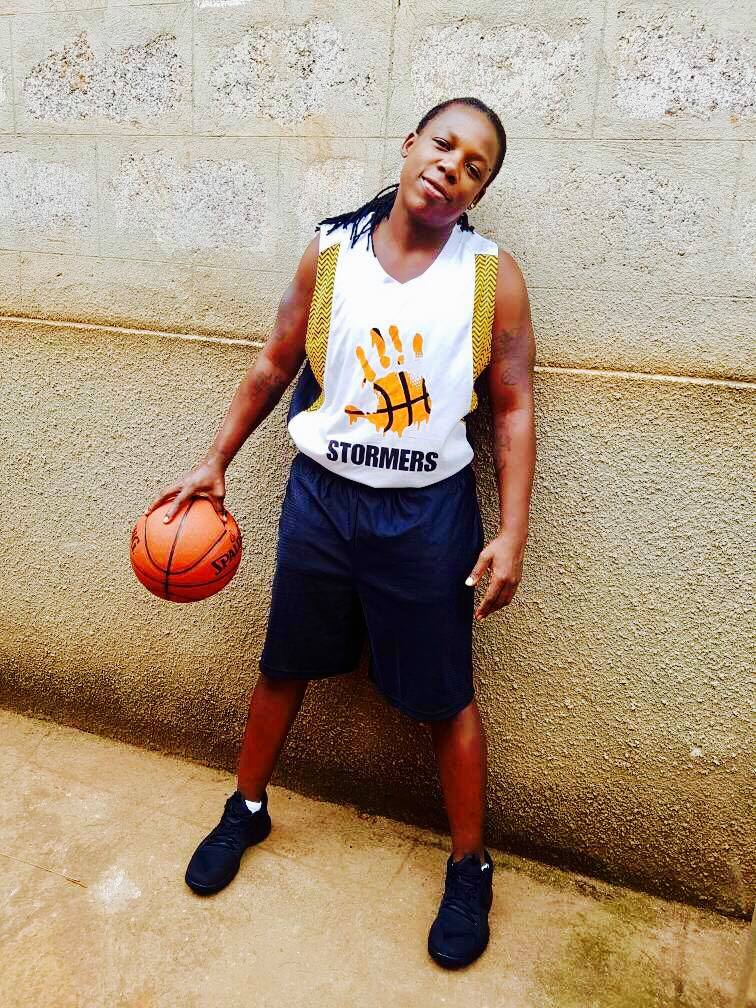
Jay Mulucha

Jay Mulucha is a Ugandan LGBT activist and basketball player of the Magic Stormers, a team participating in the Federation of Uganda Basketball League (FUBA). He is also one of the managers of the team.

== Biography ==
Mulucha started playing basketball when he was a teenager.

Mulucha, who is a trans man, nearly died after being attacked while rallying for LGBT rights. On the verge of suicide in the hospital, he decided he would continue campaigning for LGBTIQ rights in his homeland. He became the coordinator of Pride Uganda and participated in the first Pride Festival in 2012. He is also the president of Fem Alliance Uganda, an organization focusing on computer training programs and economic empowering projects to create more opportunities for Uganda's LGBT community.
