= Micheline Montreuil =

Canadian lawyer, teacher, writer, radio host, trade unionist, and politician

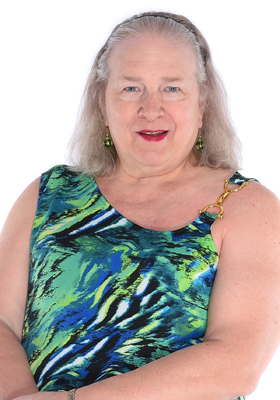
- Montreuil in 2019
- Born: June 1952 (age 74); Quebec City, Quebec, Canada
- Other name: Helene Montreuil
- Education: Université Laval; University of Manitoba; University of Ottawa; Université de Paris I - Panthéon-Sorbonne; Université du Québec à Rimouski
- Occupations: Lawyer, writer, radio host, and trade unionist
- Era: Law and industrial relations
- Employer: Université du Québec à Rimouski
- Notable work: Book «Les affaires et le droit»
- Spouse: Michele Morgan (m. 2003)
- Parent(s): Louis Papineau Montreuil; Lina Chicoine
- Website: www.montreuil.ca www.maitremontreuil.ca www.madamemontreuil.ca www.micheline.ca www.helenemontreuil.ca

Helene Montreuil or Micheline Montreuil (born June 1952) is a Canadian lawyer, teacher, writer, radio host, and trade unionist.

As a transgender woman, she first became known for her legal struggles in front of the Canadian Human Rights Tribunal, the Superior Court and the Court of Appeal in Quebec.

From 1986 to September 9, 2016, she used the first name of Micheline as she was known as Micheline Montreuil. Since September 9, 2016, she uses only the first name of Helene and she is now known under the name of Helene Montreuil.

In the following text, the first names Helene and Micheline are used depending about the time, the circumstances and the context.

== Biography ==
Helene Montreuil was born in 1952 in Quebec City, town of her family since 1637 and always her residence town. She is the daughter of Louis Papineau Montreuil and Lina Chicoine and she is the granddaughter of Yves Montreuil, public notary in Quebec City and of Leonie Papineau, on father's side, and of Georges Alfred Chicoine and Mary Lapointe, on mother's side. She is the third child of a four children's family: Louise, Georges, Helene, and Jean.

Helene Montreuil studied civil law at University Laval, common law at University of Manitoba and University of Ottawa, management at University Laval, industrial relations at University of Paris I - Pantheon-Sorbonne, and finally, ethics and education at the University of Quebec in Rimouski.

She works mainly as a lawyer since 1976 and as a professor of law, management and ethics since 1984 at the UQAR, the Université du Québec à Rimouski..

On September 13, 2003, she married the lawyer and author Michèle Morgan at the Quebec City Palais des arts. The wedding was largely covered by the newspapers and the television.

She has written many books in law and management:

- 1986 - Droit des affaires (ISBN 2-89105-214-5)
- 1990 - Organisation et dynamique de l'entreprise" en collaboration (ISBN 2-89328-009-9)
- 1991 - Initiation au droit commercial (ISBN 2-89105-337-0)
- 1993 - Organisation et dynamique de l'entreprise - Approche systémique, en collaboration (ISBN 2-89328-009-9)
- 1994 - Le droit, la personne et les affaires (ISBN 2-89105-522-5)
- 2012 - Les affaires et le droit ISBN 9-782-89366-665-5
- 2020 - Les affaires et le droit, 2e édition (ISBN 9-780-43347-946-8)

== Legal fights ==
In 1997, she begin a legal challenge against the Registrar of Civil Status of Quebec as she had not been permitted to legally change her name to Micheline. Following a Court of Appeals ruling, her request was finally accepted in 2002. (See Legal status of transgender people)

In 1998, the National Bank of Canada refused to hire Micheline Montreuil. In a judgment given on February 5, 2004, the Canadian Human Rights Tribunal ruled that the National Bank of Canada had discriminated against her on the basis of her gender identity, despite the bank attributing it to over-qualification.

Few years later, in a judgment given on November 20, 2007, the Canadian Human Rights Tribunal ruled that the Canadian Forces Grievance Board had discriminated against her on the basis of her gender identity.
