= Hornsleth Village Project =

Conceptual art project of legally renaming for livestock

The Hornsleth Village Project was a controversial conceptual art project by Danish artist Kristian von Hornsleth in which he went to the Ugandan village of Buteyongera and paid impoverished villagers to legally change their names to "Hornsleth". In exchange for consenting to have "Hornsleth" added to their identity documents, the villagers were given livestock. The project began in June 2006; in October 2006, Kampala officials put a stop to the project, citing ethical reasons.

By that time, 270 newly renamed Hornsleths had each received a pig, and another 70 had each received a goat.

Hornsleth, who said that he would like it if the village's name were eventually changed as well, described it as a straightforward business transaction, wherein he paid the villagers to participate in his project and pose for photographs.

The Ugandan Minister of Ethics, James Nsaba Buturo, responded by accusing Hornsleth of being a cult leader, obscene, mentally deranged, evil, racist, and a homosexual. He added that the project was demeaning, and stated that official diplomatic measures would be taken. Nsaba Buturo also protested against Hornsleth's use of the Ugandan national flag and the crested crane (Uganda's national bird) on the invitation cards to Hornsleth's photo exhibition in Copenhagen, entitled "We Can Help You, But We Want To Own You".

By June 2008, "most" of the residents of Buteyongera had gone back to their original names, and by 2012, Hornsleth was cited by Ugandan law enforcement as an example of "foreign nationals" who have "ulterior, selfish motives".
