= Lindon v. First National Bank =

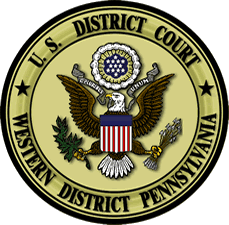
- Court: United States District Court for the Western District of Pennsylvania
- Full case name: Lindon v. First National Bank
- Decided: 1882

Lindon v. First National Bank, 10 F. 894 (W.D. Pa. 1882), is one of the very earliest precedent-setting US federal court cases involving common law name change.

A woman who had changed her last name to one that was not her husband's original surname was trying to claim control over her inheritance. The court ruled in her favor, "At common law a man may change his name, and he is bound by any contract into which he may enter in his adopted or reputed name, and by his known and recognized name he may sue and be sued." That set forth many things. By common law, one may lawfully change one's name and be "known and recognized" by that new name. Also, one may enter into any kinds of contracts in one's new adopted name. Contracts include employment (see Coppage v. Kansas 236 U.S. 1). Finally, one can be recognized legally in court in one's new name.
