= Henry Lizardlover =

American herpetoculturist

- Born: Henry Schifberg; March 27, 1954 (age 72)
- Occupations: Writer, photographer

Henry Lizardlover (born March 27, 1954, né Schifberg) is an American herpetoculturist, writer, and photographer who changed his last name to "Lizardlover" in 1986 as a symbol of his appreciation for the reptiles.

Lizardlover lives near Hollywood, California, where he shares his home with a group of between 30 and 50 different lizards, most of which are iguanas. Since 1982, Lizardlover has been photographing "family photos" of his lizards in humorous human-like poses. Photo calendars and cards are published featuring the lizards. Lizardlover has made appearances on Animal Planet, Now with Tom Brokaw, the short-lived late-night program The Chevy Chase Show, and what is described as "Univision's version of Ripley's Believe it or Not". Lizardlover and his iguanas are featured in a 2006 Ripley's Believe It or Not! book titled Ripley's Believe It or Not! Expect...The Unexpected. (ISBN 1-893951-12-X) He was a contestant in a One-on-One round of a 1990 episode of To Tell The Truth, and was a contestant on the 2006 revival of I've Got A Secret.

Lizardlover authored his first guide to reptile care, the Iguana Owner's Manual in 1992; it is now in its third edition. He and his reptile family were followed extensively in the 2002 Nature documentary Reptiles: Snakes and Lizards. Lizardlover continues to write and contribute to books on the care of reptiles.
