= Bailar =

Bailar ("dance" in Spanish) may refer to:

== People ==
- Barbara A. Bailar (born 1935), American statistician
- Benjamin F. Bailar (1934-2017), US Postmaster General from 1975 to 1978
- Gregor Bailar (born 1963), American technology executive
- John C. Bailar Jr. (1904-1991), American chemist and professor
- John C. Bailar III (1932–2016), American statistician
- Schuyler Bailar (born 1996), American swimmer

== Other uses ==
- "Bailar" (song), by DJ Deorro
- Bailar twist, a chemical mechanism
- Bailar, Iran, a village in Qazvin Province

== See also ==
- Baila (disambiguation)
