= Baila =

Baila may refer to:

== Music ==
- Baila music, a Sri Lankan music genre
- "Baïla", a 1996 single by the French boy band Alliage from their album Alliage l'album
- "Bailá Bailá", a 2021 song by Swedish singer Alvaro Estrella
- "Baila Baila Baila", a 2019 song by bu Puerto Rican singer Ozuna, as lead single from his third studio album Nibiru

== Places ==
- Baïla, a village in the rural community of Suelle, Senegal
- Băila, a village in the commune of Leordeni, Romania

== See also ==
- "Baila (Sexy Thing)", a 2001 song by Zucchero
- "Baila Me", a 1991 song by Gipsy Kings the refrain of which includes the word Baila seven consecutive times
- "Bailamos", a 1999 song by Enrique Iglesias
- Baila Conmigo (disambiguation)
- Baila Morena (disambiguation)
- Bailando (disambiguation)
- Bailar (disambiguation)
