= Conmigo =

Conmigo may refer to:

- "Conmigo" (song), 2015 song by Kendji Girac
- Baila Conmigo (disambiguation)
- Ven Conmigo (disambiguation)
