= Jamie DiNicola =

American filmmaker

- Education: Rutgers University (BA, JD)
- Occupations: Director; producer; screenwriter
- Years active: 2016–present

Jamie DiNicola is a writer, director, producer, and legal activist. He is best known as the creator and writer of the short narrative film, Spot (2017), which featured an entirely transgender cast playing non-transgender specific roles, including an early performance by Indya Moore of Pose.

== Career ==
DiNicola wrote, directed, and produced the short films, Spot (2017), Will I Say So (2019), and Fratello (2020). Both Will I Say So and Fratello had their premieres at Toronto's Inside Out Film and Video Festival. Spot was a semi-finalist at the LA CineFest, and was an official selection of Newark Film Festival, Rahway International Film Festival (where it was awarded Best Screenplay of a Short Film), Full Bloom Film Festival, Gender Reel Film Festival, and PopUp Anthology. DiNicola has been cited as one of the “10 Trans Filmmakers You Should Know” by Huffington Post. He was also featured in i-D Vice's article, “The A-Z of Trans Representation in Film.”

In 2019, DiNicola and fellow transgender filmmaker Tony Zosherafatain partnered to create the production company, TransWave Films — a trans-owned production company focused on centralizing trans stories by trans storytellers. TransWave Films later partnered with Spruce Tone Films to create the REI-sponsored short documentary, Venture Out (2020), about the non-profit organization the Venture Out Project founded by Perry Cohen. DiNicola served as director and executive producer. Venture Out received a Vimeo Staff Pick of the Year nomination and was featured at the Mountainfilm Festival and the Wild & Scenic Film Festival.

DiNicola is the producer and one of the writers of the documentary series Trans in Trumpland, which premiered on Topic, First Look Media's streaming subsidiary, on February 25, 2021. The docuseries follows the experiences of four trans individuals during the Presidency of Donald Trump in North Carolina, Texas, Mississippi and Idaho. Trans in Trumpland is produced through DiNicola and Zosherafatain's production company, TransWave Films, and is executive produced by actress Trace Lysette, and activists Chella Man and Miss Major Griffin-Gracy.

DiNicola also co-produced and was one of the cinematographers for the 2020 documentary, Julia Scotti: Funny That Way.

== Activism ==
DiNicola attended college at Rutgers University, and then studied law at Rutgers Law School. DiNicola founded and served as president of Rutgers University's first transgender organization, TransMission, which is an active organization at Rutgers University today. DiNicola worked with the university to pass and implement “The Preferred Name Policy for Trans-Identifying Students,” which allows Rutgers University students to use their preferred names instead of their legal names on all University databases.

DiNicola graduated from Rutgers Law School in 2018. While at Rutgers Law School he worked at the Human Rights Campaign in Washington D.C. and was the recipient of the Fanny Bear Besser Award for his LGBTQ activist work.

== Filmography ==
=== Film ===
Year	Title	Role	Notes
2016	We're Making Wine	Director, producer, cinematographer	Short film
2017	Spot	Director, writer, producer	Short film
2019	Will I Say So	Director, writer, producer	Short film
2019	Fratello	Director, writer, producer	Short film
2019	A Vast and Curious Universe	Cinematographer	Short film
2020	Venture Out	Co-director, executive producer, cinematographer	Short film
2020	Julia Scotti: Funny That Way	Co-producer, cinematographer	Feature film

=== Television ===
Year	Title	Role	Notes
2021	Trans in Trumpland	Producer, writer	4 episodes
