= John Bailar =

John Bailar may refer to:

- John C. Bailar Jr. (1904–1991), American chemist
- John C. Bailar III (1932–2016), American biostatistician
