= Baila Morena =

Baila Morena may refer to:

- "Baila morena" (Lucenzo song)
- "Baila morena" (Zucchero song)
- "Morena", also known as "Baila morena", by Héctor & Tito from La Historia Live
- "Baila morena", by Ardian Bujupi from the album 10 (2021)
- "Baila morena", by Julio Iglesias from La Carretera
- "Baila morena", by Los Caños from Los Caños (2000)
- "Baila morena", by Tito El Bambino and J Quiles from El Muñeco (2020)

== See also ==
- Baila (disambiguation)
