= Tony Zosherafatain =

Film director

Tony Zosherafatain (born December 21, 1987) is an American director, producer, and writer from Boston, Massachusetts. He is a trans man and has directed and produced award-winning films about trans identity.

== Early life ==
Zosherafatain was born on December 21, 1987, in Boston, Massachusetts, the oldest of two. He was assigned female at birth and was born to an Iranian father and a Greek mother. His father is originally from Tehran, Iran, and his mother is from Ganochora, Greece. He spent most of his life in Reading, Massachusetts. In middle school, he would frequently borrow his family's camcorder to film his neighborhood friends playing pranks.

He attended Wesleyan University where he pursued student government, film making, and writing. He was a Watson Fellow finalist in his senior year at Wesleyan for his proposal to produce a documentary about transgender identity across diverse cultural settings. Upon his graduation from Wesleyan in 2010, he went on to attend New York University and moved to New York City to begin his film career.

== Career ==
His films portray trans identity, intersectionality, civil and political rights, and political movements. He directed Trans in Trumpland, a documentary about being transgender in the Trump administration era. The film is being produced through TransWave Films, a production company run by Zosherafatain and fellow trans filmmaker Jamie DiNicola, and is supported by Executive Producer Miss Major Griffin-Gracy. Jason B. Kohl serves as Lead Editor of Trans in Trumpland alongside Tchavdar Georgiev as Consulting Editor. After a successful Kickstarter campaign, and media coverage by GLAAD, the film completed production in 2019 and is in post-production.

In 2012 Zosherafatain began to address the lack of films about transgender stories. His films include Finding Cedar, Fratello, I am Isak, and Venture Out. Venture Out focuses on an LGBTQ outdoors group and was selected for distribution by REI. His films have screened at domestic and international film festivals, including Inside Out, Emerging Lens, Thessaloniki LGBT Film Festival, and Shanghai Queer Film Festival. He was the recipient of a Finalist Award at Emerging Lens.

He began writing for the Huffington Post in 2017, after realizing he faced unique challenges as a transgender Iranian-American. According to editors Paul Nixon and Isabel Dusterhoft, his writing offers analysis of normative ideas about gender, masculinity, and beauty. After releasing an article entitled "I’m Iranian-American. This Is What Trump’s America Feels Like", his writing was published on the Huffington Post, Thought Catalog, and Medium. He appeared in Mark Seliger's book On Christopher Street: Transgender Stories, and his role in this book was included in a New York Times article, and in The Advocate. In 2015, he was part of a series of portraits of the trans community published in The New Yorker. He has also written for trans youth in a BuzzFeed article, and joined a group of FTM panelists discussing chest binding for a BuzzFeed short film. In 2016, he advocated to increase accessibility to gender affirmation surgery. He was portrayed in an online BBC video series.

== Filmography ==
=== Short films ===
- Fratello (2019)
- Venture Out (2020)

=== Short documentaries ===
- I am Isak (2017)
- Call me Kye (2019)
- Finding Cedar (2020)

=== Feature documentaries ===
- Trans in Trumpland (2020)
