= Dance with Me =

Dance with Me may refer to:

== Film and theatre ==
- Dance with Me (musical), a 1975 Broadway musical
- Dance with Me (1998 film), an American film directed by Randa Haines
- Dance with Me (2019 Iranian film), a film directed by Soroush Sehhat
- Dance with Me (2019 Japanese film), a film directed by Shinobu Yaguchi

== Music ==
=== Albums ===
- Dance with Me (Debelah Morgan album) or the title song (see below), 2000
- Dance with Me (Friends album) or the title song, 2002
- Dance with Me (Jimmy Sturr and His Orchestra album), 1998
- Dance with Me (Johnny Reid album) or the title song, 2009
- Dance with Me (T.S.O.L. album) or the title song, 1981
- Dance with Me: Music from the Motion Picture, from the 1998 film
- Dance with Me (EP), by Short Stack, 2015
- Dance with Me, by DJ BoBo, 1993
- Dance with Me, by José Alberto "El Canario", 1991
- Dance with Me, by Rosie Gaines, 2015

=== Songs ===
- "Dance with Me" (112 song), 2001
- "Dance with Me" (Air Supply song), 2010
- "Dance with Me" (Alphaville song), 1986
- "Dance with Me" (Blink-182 song), 2023
- "Dance with Me" (Bruno Mars song), 2026
- "Dance with Me" (Debelah Morgan song), 2000
- "Dance with Me" (Drew Seeley song), 2006
- "Dance with Me" (The Drifters song), 1959
- "Dance with Me" (Hot Rod song), 2010
- "Dance with Me" (Justice Crew song), 2011
- "Dance with Me" (Kelly Clarkson song), 2015
- "Dance with Me" (Le Youth song), 2014
- "Dance with Me" (Orleans song), 1975
- "Dance with Me" (Peter Brown song), 1978
- "Dance with Me" (Tones and I song), 2024
- "Dance with Me" (Zoli Ádok song), 2009
- "Dance with Me (Just One More Time)", by Johnny Rodriguez, 1974
- "Dance wit' Me", by Rick James, 1982
- "Dance wiv Me", by Dizzee Rascal, 2008
- "Dance with Me", by Aaron Carter, 2009
- "Dance with Me", by Adam Green from Garfield, 2002
- "Dance with Me", by Alice in Videoland from Maiden Voyage, 2003
- "Dance with Me", by Beabadoobee, 2018
- "Dance with Me", by Chad Focus, 2018
- "Dance with Me", by Chic from It's About Time, 2018
- "Dance with Me", by D'Sound, 2015
- "Dance with Me", by Destiny's Child from Survivor, 2001
- "Dance with Me", by Diplo, Thomas Rhett, and Young Thug from Diplo Presents Thomas Wesley, Chapter 1: Snake Oil, 2020
- "Dance with Me", by Estelle from The 18th Day, 2004
- "Dance with Me", by Jennifer Lopez from J.Lo, 2001
- "Dance with Me", by Joyce Manor from 40 oz. to Fresno, 2022
- "Dance with Me", by the Lords of the New Church from Is Nothing Sacred?, 1983
- "Dance with Me", by Lost Frequencies from Less Is More, 2016
- "Dance with Me", by Old 97's from Blame It on Gravity, 2008
- "Dance with Me", by Petula Clark from My Love, 1966
- "Dance with Me", by Reginald Bosanquet, 1980
- "Dance with Me", by the Sounds from Living in America, 2002
- "Dance with Me", by Steeleye Span from All Around My Hat, 1975
- "Dance with Me", by VBirds, 2003

== See also ==
- Baila Conmigo (disambiguation) ("Dance with Me" in Spanish)
- Come Dance with Me (disambiguation)
- Dance for Me (disambiguation)
