= A bailar =

A bailar (Spanish "to dance") may refer to:

== Music ==
=== Albums ===
- A Bailar (Banghra album), album by Banghra
- A Bailar (Lali album), album by Lali

=== Songs ===
- "A bailar", tango by Piazzolla feat. Francisco Fiorentino
- "A bailar", tango by Aníbal Troilo Homero Expósito / Domingo Federico
- "A bailar", song by Gloria Estefan feat. Papo Lucca from 90 Millas G.Estefan/Gaitán/E. Estefan 2007
- "A Bailar" (Lali Espósito song)
- "A bailar", song by Zacarías Ferreíra from El Triste (Zacarías Ferreíra album) 2004
- "A Bailar" by La Sonora Matancera composed by Bienvenido Granda from Algo Especial Por La Sonora Matancera 1994
- "Al Bailar", song by Yuri (Mexican singer)
- "A Bailar Merengue", song by Xavier Cugat And His Orchestra, 1956

== See also ==
- Bailar (disambiguation)
