= Court jester (disambiguation) =

A court jester is a type of entertainer.

Court jester may also refer to:

- The Court Jester, a 1956 film
- The Court Jesters, an improv company
- The Court Jesters (band)
- Court Jester goby, a species of fish
- Court jester hypothesis, in evolutionary biology

== See also ==
- Jester (disambiguation)
