= Lysette =

Lysette is a feminine given name, a diminutive of Elizabeth, and a surname.

== Given name ==
- Lysette Anthony (Lysette Anne Chodzko, born 1963), English actress and model
- Lysette Brochu (born 1946), French-Canadian writer

== Surname ==
- Trace Lysette (born 1981), American actress

== Fictional characters ==
- Lysette, from a 1959 Armchair Theatre episode with the same name
