= Trans in Trumpland =

2021 documentary television series

- Genre: Documentary
- Directed by: Tony Zosherafatain
- Composer: Jake Hull
- Country of origin: United States
- Original languages: English; Spanish
- No. of seasons: 1
- No. of episodes: 4

Production
- Executive producers: Ryan Chanatry; Miss Major Griffin-Gracy; Jason B. Kohl; Trace Lysette; Chella Man; Jeff Seelbach
- Producer: Jamie DiNicola
- Cinematography: Leroy Farrell
- Editor: Jason B. Kohl
- Running time: 25-32 minutes
- Production company: TransWave Films

Original release
- Network: Topic
- Release: February 25, 2021

Trans in Trumpland is a 2021 American four-episode docu-series directed by Tony Zosherafatain that chronicles the experiences of four transgender Americans during the first presidency of Donald Trump in North Carolina, Texas, Mississippi, and Idaho and investigates transgender rights in the United States during the Trump era. It premiered on February 25, 2021, on Topic, a streaming service from First Look Media.

== Production ==
The series was directed, hosted, and narrated by filmmaker Tony Zosherafatain. It was created by trans-run production company TransWave Films, and produced by Jamie DiNicola, with executive producers Trace Lysette, Miss Major Griffin-Gracy, and Chella Man. Associate producers include Miss Hazel Jade and Gabriel Resendez.

Development of the series began in 2016 the week that Trump won the election. In an interview with Interview Magazine, Zosherafatain stated: "in 2016, when Trump took office, I remember that first week just feeling really scared. He removed any mention of LGBTQ rights at all from the White House website, and I couldn't really sleep. It was hard. Three days into his presidency, Trans in Trumpland just popped right in. It was like, 'There you go. Run with this, kid.' And then I had to think about what exactly this would mean. What kind of documentary would this be? I just had a feeling [Trump] was going to attack our community even worse than that first week."

Zosherafatain "spent the next three years developing the concept and raising money through Kickstarter." After a successful Kickstarter campaign in August 2019 raised $65,000, production began in September 2019 in North Carolina, Texas, Mississippi, and Idaho; filming completed in December 2019.

== Episodes ==
No.	Title	Original release date
1	"North Carolina"	February 25, 2021
High school comes with enough struggles, but Ash also has to deal with painful gender dysphoria and a fear of simply going to the bathroom. But he still believes coming out as trans saved his life and is finding more strength each day.
2	"Texas"	February 25, 2021
For Rebecca, a trans woman and Mexican immigrant living on the border, discrimination comes from many directions. Can she live freely in a state with one of the highest immigration detention rates?
3	"Mississippi"	February 25, 2021
Meet the owner of the first trans-focused nonprofit in Mississippi. After her friend Mesha Caldwell was murdered for being trans, Evonné started her organization to help protect the trans community in a state that fails to do so.
4	"Idaho"	February 25, 2021
Shane Ortega identifies as Two-Spirit, a Native term referring to a person with both a feminine and masculine spirit. The Idaho resident and retired Army veteran believes that trans rights are inextricably linked to the decolonization of America.

== Release ==
The series was acquired by Topic, the streaming service for First Look Media, which acquired North American streaming rights to the series. Trans in Trumpland was released on February 25, 2021, on Topic, and is also available on Amazon Prime Video and Apple TV.

Though the series premiered after Trump was no longer President of the United States, Zosherafatain believes that the issues raised in the series regarding transgender policies will remain relevant in the future.

== Reception ==
Trans in Trumpland has received critical acclaim. Allsion Shoemaker and Saloni Gajjar of The A.V. Club wrote that the series is "a step beyond negative headlines, offering a glimpse into the lived experience of those directly affected by laws such as the discriminatory HB2 bill, which prohibits trans people from using bathrooms and lockers that align with their gender identity, or the trans military ban," and "this docuseries is a heartfelt must-watch." Writing for Vogue, Liam Hess summarized the effectiveness of the series, stating, "the four stories come together to form a rich and moving tapestry, touching on how trans people across a range of intersectional identities have responded to the challenges of living under the Trump administration—as well as their hopes for and vision of the future." Benedict Nguyen of Vanity Fair called the series "a vital contribution to the trans media canon" but that the series "could have told more complex stories, covering an even wider breadth of experience or addressing the violence of Trump-era policies in more depth."

LGBTQ+ media strongly praised the series. Johnny Yates of PinkNews described Trans in Trumpland as "a powerful new documentary that puts the spotlight on transgender lives in the Trump era...everyone needs to watch it." Xoai Pham of Autostraddle stated, "rather than simply presenting the culture of violence, the series' creator Tony Zosherafatain delivered a resounding celebration of the relationships that sustain trans lives" and that "we are in a new wave of visionary trans filmmaking, with documentaries like Disclosure, feature films like Lingua Franca, and TV shows like Veneno. Remarkably, Trans in Trumpland is no exception."
