= Dance for Me =

Dance for Me or Dance 4 Me may refer to:

- Dance for Me, a 2002 remix album by Mary J. Blige
- "Dance 4 Me" (Prince song), 2009
- "Dance 4 Me", song from Innocent Man (Mark Morrison album), 2007
- "Dance for Me" (Empire Mates Entertainment song), 2012
- "Dance for Me" (Mary J. Blige song), 2001
- "Dance for Me" (Sisqó song), 2001
- "Dance for Me", song by The Court Jesters, 1967
- "Dance for Me", song by Robert Palmer, 1985
- "Dance for Me", song by Queen Latifah, 1989
- "Dance for Me", song by Alma featuring MØ, 2018

== See also ==
- Dance with Me (disambiguation)
