= Monica (2022 film) =

Film by Andrea Pallaoro

- Poster
- Directed by: Andrea Pallaoro
- Written by: Andrea Pallaoro; Orlando Tirado
- Produced by: Andrea Pallaoro; Christina Dow; Elenora Granata-Jenkinson; Gina Resnick; Joana Henning
- Starring: Trace Lysette; Patricia Clarkson; Emily Browning; Joshua Close; Adriana Barraza
- Cinematography: Katelin Arizmendi
- Edited by: Paola Freddi
- Production companies: Rai Cinema; Propaganda Italia; Fenix Entertainment; Alacran Pictures; The Exchange
- Distributed by: Arthouse (Italy); IFC Films (United States)
- Release dates: September 3, 2022 (Venice); December 1, 2022 (Italy); May 12, 2023 (United States)
- Running time: 106 minutes
- Countries: United States; Italy
- Language: English
- Budget: $1.7 million
- Box office: $182,156

Monica is a 2022 drama film directed by Andrea Pallaoro from a screenplay by Pallaoro and Orlando Tirado. It stars Trace Lysette, Patricia Clarkson, Emily Browning, and Adriana Barraza.

The film had its world premiere at the 79th Venice International Film Festival on September 3, 2022, and it was released by IFC Films in the United States on May 12, 2023.

== Plot ==
Monica, a trans woman, receives a call from her sister-in-law informing her that her mother, Eugenia, is seriously ill. Monica is estranged from her mother, who had disowned Monica because of her sexuality. However, Monica decides to return home to help care for her mother. When Monica arrives, she discovers that Eugenia does not recognize her, due to the fact that she hasn't seen Monica since her transition and a brain tumor is affecting her cognitive functions. Instead of revealing who she is, Monica decides to keep her identity a secret.

== Cast ==
- Trace Lysette as Monica
- Patricia Clarkson as Eugenia
- Emily Browning as Laura
- Adriana Barraza as Leticia
- Joshua Close as Paul
- Leland and Brennan Pittman as Benny

== Production ==
In 2016, Trace Lysette auditioned for the titular role, winning the role, and then became an executive producer.

In September 2020, Patricia Clarkson, Trace Lysette, Anna Paquin and Adriana Barraza joined the cast of the film, with Andrea Pallaoro directing from a screenplay he wrote alongside Orlando Tirado. In June 2021, Emily Browning joined the cast of the film, replacing Paquin who exited the project due to scheduling conflicts.

Principal photography began in June 2021.

== Release ==
The film had its world premiere at the 79th Venice International Film Festival on September 3, 2022, where Lysette received an 11-minute standing ovation for her performance. Italian distributor Arthouse (a label of I Wonder Pictures) scheduled a December 1, 2022, Italian theatrical release date. In December 2022, IFC Films acquired distribution rights to the film. It was released in the United States on May 12, 2023.

== Reception ==
On the review aggregator website Rotten Tomatoes, 84% of 62 critics' reviews are positive, with an average rating of 7.7/10. The website's consensus reads: "Bolstered by a powerful lead performance from Trace Lysette, Monica follows a personal quest that's as beautifully filmed as it is emotionally resonant." Metacritic, which uses a weighted average, assigned the film a score of 75 out of 100, based on 15 critics, indicating "generally favorable" reviews.

Peter Sobczynski of RogerEbert.com gave the film 4 stars out of 4, praising Lysette's performance and calling the film "a quiet, heartfelt, and beautifully nuanced drama that feels unique and universal."

== Awards and nominations ==
Award	Date of ceremony	Category	Nominee	Result	Ref.
Independent Spirit Awards	February 25, 2024	Best Lead Performance	Trace Lysette	Nominated	
GLAAD Media Awards	March 14, 2024	Outstanding Film – Limited Release	Monica	Won	

== See also ==
- List of Italian films of 2022
