= New Money (2017 film) =

- Theatrical release poster
- Directed by: Jason B. Kohl
- Written by: Jason B. Kohl
- Produced by: Kale Davidoff; Jason B. Kohl; Anja Wedell; Ashley Young
- Starring: Louisa Krause; Brendan Sexton III; Robin Weigert; Chelcie Ross
- Cinematography: Amanda Treyz
- Edited by: Eric F. Martin
- Music by: Heather McIntosh
- Production companies: Czar Film Gmbh; Mako Films
- Distributed by: Gravitas Ventures
- Release dates: November 27, 2017 (Tallinn Black Nights Film Festival); April 16, 2019
- Running time: 85 minutes
- Country: United States
- Language: English

New Money is an American crime drama film written and directed by Jason B. Kohl. It stars Louisa Krause, Robin Weigert, Brendan Sexton III and Chelcie Ross. The plot follows a pet store worker who kidnaps her estranged father after he cuts her out of his will. The film had its world premiere at the Tallinn Black Nights Film Festival, and won the audience award at the 2018 Indie Memphis Film Festival. The film was released on April 16, 2019, by Gravitas Ventures.

== Plot ==
The film opens on Debbie Tisdale's 30th birthday. Her gift is supposed to be a small inheritance of $50,000 from her estranged father Boyd, but she soon learns that Boyd, under the influence of his younger wife Rose, has cut Debbie out of his will. Debbie suspects foul play; Boyd has dementia and could have easily been manipulated.

After a failed negotiation, Debbie and her boyfriend Steve kidnap Boyd and head north, where they break into an elegant lake house, empty for the season. Once there Debbie forms a plan to access to her inheritance by darker means.

== Cast ==
- Louisa Krause as Debbie Tisdale
- Brendan Sexton III as Steve Purdy
- Chelcie Ross as Boyd Tisdale
- Robin Weigert as Rose Tisdale
- David W. Thompson as Chris
- Tom Wopat as John Breckner

== Production ==
The film was shot on location in Lansing and Detroit, Michigan. It was the first feature film to shoot in Michigan after Governor Snyder eliminated the state's film tax credit.

== Release ==
The film had its world premiere in November 2017 at the Tallinn Black Nights Film Festival. It continued to play various film festivals including the 2018 Newport Beach Film Festival. It screened in competition at the 2018 Indie Memphis Film Festival, where it won both best poster and the audience award.

The film was released on April 16, 2019, in the US by Gravitas Ventures, followed by a theatrical release in Germany and Austria.

== Reception ==
=== Critical response ===
On Rotten Tomatoes, New Money has an approval rating of 60% based on 5 reviews.

Film Threat gave the film a rating of 9 out of 10, calling it "a smart, engaging thriller. Kohl has delivered a perfectly encapsulated Coen brothers-style narrative with airtight precision... New Money serves as an excellent reminder of where desperation can lead if we let it get the better of us."

Douglas Davidson, writing for Elements of Madness, wrote "New Money is a powder keg of emotion... beautifully shot, scored and performed." Vanessa Stewart of Mother of Movies singled out the performances, writing "The cast glow with perfectly-attuned performances... this is not a movie to be missed." David Duprey, writing for That Moment In, called the film "well made and deeply authentic".
