= Dante "Tex" Gill =

American transmasculine gangster and massage parlor owner

Dante Gill
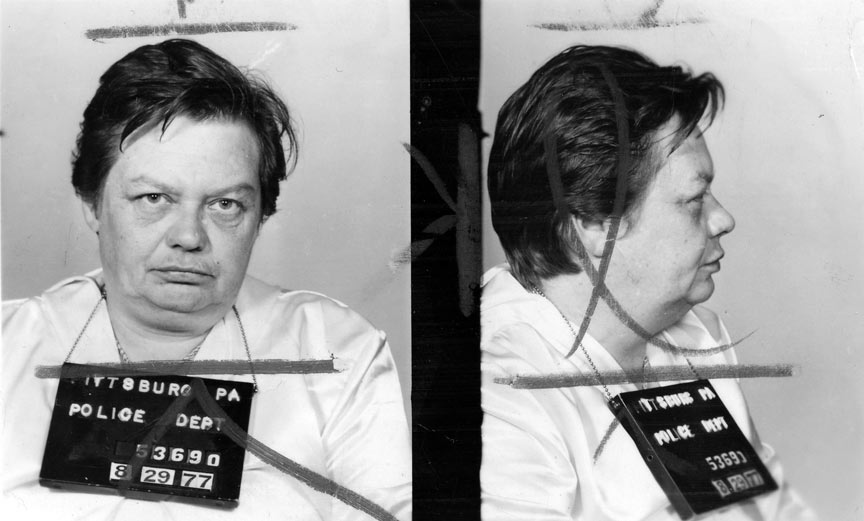
- Gill's 1977 mug shot
- Born: 1930 or 1931; Pittsburgh, Pennsylvania, U.S.
- Died: January 8, 2003 (aged 72); UPMC McKeesport, McKeesport, Pennsylvania, U.S.
- Other name: Tex Gill
- Occupations: Businessman; pimp
- Criminal charges: Tax evasion
- Criminal penalty: 13-year sentence (7 years served)

Dante "Tex" Gill (died January 8, 2003) was an American transmasculine gangster, pimp and massage parlor owner.

Born in Pittsburgh, Pennsylvania, Gill worked as a blacksmith before getting involved in the massage parlor industry. He was arrested several times during the 1960s and 1970s, and associated with prominent members of the city's sex industry and criminal underground. In 1984, he was sentenced to thirteen years in prison after being found guilty of conspiracy and tax evasion in a federal court. He was released after three years and died in 2003.

Gill was known throughout his life for his masculine presentation, and has been seen by some modern audiences as a transmasculine person and member of the transgender community. A biopic of his life was proposed in the 2010s, but the project received backlash after Scarlett Johansson, a cisgender woman, was cast in the lead role. The idea was later reworked as a television series starring transgender actors.

== Early life ==
Gill was born in Pittsburgh, Pennsylvania. His parents were Walter and Agnes Gill, and he had three brothers (Walter Jr., Donald and Merritt). He was a cousin of Pittsburgh Post-Gazette journalist Barry Paris. One of Gill's nephews was involved in the parlor industry, being the manager of Top of the Hill Meditation Center in Mount Oliver. He had been issued with a warrant for the promotion of prostitution following a police raid in April 1978, but died in a car crash later that year.

== Career ==
In the 1950s, Gill worked as a blacksmith at the Schenley Park stables.

As a businessman, Gill was the owner of a baby furniture store and a frozen foods store. The latter, a business named Family Food Service, was accused of misrepresenting their goods by selling ungraded meat and overcharging for their freezers. In 1979, he said he made his living operating the Take Me Paint Me ceramics shop in South Side.

=== Sex industry ===
As his mother was sick from cancer—eventually dying in 1973—Gill began operating massage parlors in the red-light district at Pittsburgh's Liberty Avenue. The business premises operated as front organizations for an illegal brothel industry, with Gill working as a pimp to procure sex workers. During this period, he associated with George E. Lee, a prominent parlor operator who was described by the Pittsburgh Post-Gazette as the "king of Pittsburgh pornography". Following Lee's murder in February 1977, a turf war was enacted to gain control over the city's massage parlor and prostitution industries. Gill and former Lee associate Nick DeLucia purchased the Liberty Avenue nightclub Applause (also known as Stage 966) together in October that year, but were legally challenged by another associate named Mel H. Cummings over using dirty money. In December 1977, massage parlor operator Anthony Pugh was shot dead in Scott Township: Gill was allegedly questioned by police in connection with the murder, alongside other industry figures. The following week, a bomb exploded at DeLucia's parlor Gemini, killing one person. Gill and DeLucia were later considered key competitors in the parlor industry, prior to the latter's imprisonment in 1981.

In January 1978, a Pittsburgh Post-Gazette report suggested that the massage parlor industry was connected to the Pittsburgh crime family, then under control of John LaRocca.

Gill operated several massage parlors himself, including:

- Spartacus, located in McKees Rocks
- The Taurean, located at 138 Ninth Street
- The Airport Executive Swim and Bath Club, located at 112 Maple Lane in Moon Township
- The Aardvark Studio II, located at 943 Liberty Avenue
- Roman V, located above an adult bookstore at 801 Liberty Avenue

=== Arrests ===
According to a January 1978 report by the Pittsburgh Post-Gazette, Gill had been arrested at least eight times prior. In 1964, while still working at Schenley Park, Gill was arrested on a prostitution charge concerning the alleged "entertainment" of men in a trailer. In December 1974, he was one of five Pittsburgh locals indicted over an alleged prostitution ring operating between Pennsylvania and Indiana, following an investigation by the FBI and the Department of Justice.

In March 1978, Gill and six others were arrested during a police raid at one of his parlors after an undercover officer was propositioned. He later pleaded guilty to disorderly conduct charges during the raid, after admitting to throwing a birthday cake at the officer. In May 1979, Gill was charged with prostitution and conspiracy charges having been accused of operating a call-girl center at the Union Trust Building. He was later cleared after a judge ruled there was insufficient evidence to connect him to the case, while his two former co-defendants were both found guilty on prostitution charges.

==== Tax evasion case ====
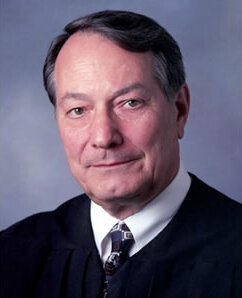
Gustave Diamond ruled on the federal tax evasion case which saw Gill imprisoned

In 1980, it was reported that Robert J. Cindrich—a United States attorney—intended to build a tax evasion case against Gill by subpoenaing his lawyers Carl Janavitz, Rochelle Friedman and Harold Gondelman to answer questions regarding their work as representatives of Gill. The three opposed the action as a violation of attorney–client privilege and were supported by the American Civil Liberties Union (ACLU). Janavitz and Friedman filed motions to have the subpoenas removed, but the move was upheld by United States district judge Donald Emil Ziegler.

On September 28, 1982, Gill was stopped by police and charged with traffic violations for failing to carry a driving license and for operating a car with an expired plate. In the same incident, he had $87,000 worth of cash confiscated by the police: it was seized by the Internal Revenue Service (IRS) days later. The following November, Gill filed suit in federal court over the cash, later dropping the lawsuit after the court stopped its ownership claims on the money and his Allegheny County properties.

On June 14, 1983, court papers confirmed that a federal grand jury was investigating Gill for possible tax evasion. Alan N. Bloch—a United States district judge—ordered three associates of Gill's to provide handwriting samples in connection with massage parlor business documents. In April 1984, Gill and five associates were indicted by the federal grand jury on charges of conspiracy and income tax evasion.

The trial against Gill began on October 1, 1984, and was preceded over by United States District Judge Gustave Diamond. On November 21, Gill and two others were found guilty on conspiracy charges. Two days later, he was found guilty on four counts of tax evasion and fraud committed during the late 1970s. Gill was originally given a thirteen-year prison sentence in January 1985, but it was reduced by six years after he agreed to close his massage parlors within 24 hours of the original sentence.

Gill was incarcerated at the Federal Medical Center in Lexington, Kentucky. He began a lawsuit against the Pennsylvania Department of Corrections in June 1987, seeking a temporary restraining order to force officials to admit him to a halfway house. He was released on parole on November 25, 1987.

=== Later life ===
In January 1991, United States government attorneys filed a civil suit against Gill for $12.1 million in taxes, interest and penalties from 1977 to 1983. In May that year, it was ruled that Gill owed the federal government $13.5 million for non-payment of income taxes.

Gill died at the age of 72 on January 8, 2003, at UPMC hospital in McKeesport, Pennsylvania.

== Personal life ==
In September 1979, Gill's cohabitee Cynthia Bruno filed a petition to change her surname to Gill. The following year, she was described as Gill's "close personal companion" by the Pittsburgh Post-Gazette. She was referred to as Gill's estranged wife and former employee in his 1984 grand jury indictment.

=== Gender identity and sexuality ===
Throughout his life, Gill sought to present himself in a masculine way and wished to be seen as a man: he wore men's suits, had short hair, "talked tough" and requested that people call him "Mr Gill". He legally changed his name to Dante Gill during 1965, and also used the name "Tex" since at least December 1974. A 2018 statement from Gill's cousin Barry Paris said that "he totally identified as a man from the time my cousins and I first knew him. He was always overtly masculine. He hated to be called 'she', and that's what the police always did, and the papers. It annoyed and upset him". In December 1984, following his guilty verdict in the tax evasion case, Gill was awarded the "Dubious Man of the Year" and "Dubious Woman of the Year" awards by The Pittsburgh Press Sunday Magazine, the latter stating:

Tex's only real challenge came from Phyllis Schlafly, although Divine, Barbara Bush and Pia Zadora also had ardent supporters. But in Tex we see the perfect symbol for the upscale androgyny of the 1980s. She [sic] embodies business savvy, sexual confusion and an eye for fashion like no one since Michael Jackson.

Gill may have begun a medical transition, but it is unclear.

Modern publications have differed in how they refer to Gill. Vulture described him as a "transmasculine crime boss", and The Independent called him a "trans male", while Deadline referred to his actions as "cross-dressing" and used she/her pronouns. The Pittsburgh Post-Gazette obituary article for Gill referred to him as "an unabashed lesbian in a less sexually liberated age" and "someone who had to hide her sexuality as a single woman in the transgender community".

== Legacy ==
During the 2010s, plans were made to produce a film based on Gill's life. In July 2018, it was announced that Rupert Sanders would be directing a film titled Rub & Tug featuring Scarlett Johansson in the leading role. The announcement of Johansson—a cisgender woman—playing Gill received criticism from members of the transgender community including actresses Trace Lysette and Jamie Clayton. Johansson originally dismissed the complaints but later withdrew from the project.

In 2020, Deadline announced that Rub & Tug was being redeveloped into a television series. Transgender screenwriter Our Lady J was signed to write the pilot episode and New Regency Productions stated their commitment to cast a transgender actor in the lead role. Gill's former partner Cynthia Bruno Gill was also said to be serving as a consultant on the project.
