= The Babysitters =

2007 independent drama film

- Theatrical release poster
- Directed by: David Ross
- Written by: David Ross
- Produced by: John Leguizamo; Kathy DeMarco; Cora Olson; Jennifer Dubin; Jason Dubin
- Starring: John Leguizamo; Katherine Waterston; Cynthia Nixon; Lauren Birkell; Louisa Krause; Andy Comeau; Denis O'Hare
- Cinematography: Michael McDonough
- Edited by: Zene Baker
- Music by: Chad Fischer
- Distributed by: Peace Arch Releasing
- Release dates: September 11, 2007 (Toronto International Film Festival); May 9, 2008 (United States)
- Running time: 88 minutes
- Country: United States
- Language: English

The Babysitters is a 2007 American drama film written and directed by David Ross. It stars John Leguizamo, Katherine Waterston and Cynthia Nixon, with Andy Comeau and Denis O'Hare. The story follows a teenager who turns her babysitting service into a call girl service for married men after fooling around with one of her customers.

The independent film premiered at the Toronto International Film Festival on September 11, 2007, and was released in the United States on May 9, 2008, by Peace Arch Releasing, to negative reviews from critics.

== Plot ==
In voice over, Shirley Lyner (Waterston) introduces her babysitting service, a cabin with middle-aged men and teenage girls. A flashback takes us to Shirley being picked up by Michael Beltran (Leguizamo) for a babysitting job. After she is finished, they dine together and flirt with each other. Michael is frustrated with his wife and Shirley finds guys her age to be too immature.

Michael and his wife Gail (Nixon) meet with Michael's friend Jerry (Comeau), who has a business offer for Michael. Gail is frustrated that Michael wants to take it, while Michael gets curious about an abandoned train yard behind the restaurant that Gail shows no interest in. When Michael is driving Shirley home that night, they stop at the train yard and explore it, eventually sharing a kiss. They come to the conclusion that they couldn't do that anymore, but Michael pays Shirley extra.

Melissa (Lauren Birkell) discovers the truth about babysitting outings from Shirley and Michael tells Jerry about it. Michael asks Shirley if any of her other friends can "babysit" and her friend Melissa volunteers. Shirley asks her for 20% of the money as her cut to which Melissa agrees. They convince their friend Brenda (Louisa Krause) to take the babysitting job as well and the girls set up a working business, going so far as to have business cards printed up. Michael learns that Shirley is babysitting for others besides him, which makes him uncomfortable and upset.

Problems arise when Brenda invites her rough and aggressive younger stepsister Nadine (Halley Wegryn Gross) into the group without checking with Shirley. She soon starts her own competing business behind Shirley's back, and Shirley starts to lose customers. Shirley confronts Brenda and Brenda agrees to search Nadine's room. She reports back that she found nothing. With Michael 'on watch', Shirley and Melissa search Nadine's locker but find nothing. They trash the school to hide their true motive. The next day everything was destroyed, which called for a mandatory assembly. During the assembly Shirley calls the girls to the band room to discuss the issues. Shirley then tells Nadine to stop going behind her back and doing business without her permission and that she gets twenty percent of all their cuts. Then they all are dismissed.

Melissa presents Shirley with fake permission slips for a trip to Jerry's cabin for a weekend. The girls will be going under the make-believe of a school trip, while the men will be there on a "business retreat". Michael is uncomfortable with Shirley being with other guys at the party. Jerry has supplied drugs at the party and attempts to rape Brenda.

Later at school, Brenda decides she wants to quit and Shirley agrees but Melissa is worried that Brenda will talk. Melissa has several of their customers attack and threaten Brenda's brother. Shirley finds out and confronts Melissa at lunch and gets upset.

Michael's wife confronts him about his distance and that he has been lying about his job situation and Michael finally voices some of his frustrations about the marriage, while Gail responds with hers. Michael tries to encourage Shirley to run away with him, while Shirley reminds him that this is just business and he's cheating himself. She ups the price for him and walks off.

She then tries unsuccessfully to contact Brenda. She hears that Nadine is babysitting without her knowledge and calls Melissa, who is with Jerry, and they go to confront her. They soon arrive and Jerry finds Nadine and gives her to Shirley and Melissa who then threaten to throw her off a building. With Nadine almost falling off, Jerry pulls her back after beating up the man in the vehicle. Shirley then discovers that her own father was having sex with Nadine. She then breaks down and starts to cry.

In another voiceover by Shirley, she talks about how it was a unique moment in an otherwise ordinary life. Shirley watches Michael interacting with his family. He glances over and then walks off, leaving Shirley who then drives off, knowing the relationship is over.

== Release ==
=== Home media ===
The Babysitters was released on DVD on September 16, 2008. It later saw a Blu-ray release by Phase 4 Films on February 2, 2010.

== Reception ==
=== Critical response ===
On review aggregator Rotten Tomatoes the film has an approval rating of 33% based on 27 reviews, with an average rating of 4.4/10. The website's critics consensus reads: "Though built on an audacious and controversial premise, Babysitters teeters between exploitation and grossness due to uneven execution." On Metacritic it has a score of 35% based on reviews from 11 critics, indicating "generally unfavorable reviews".

== Soundtrack ==
No official soundtrack was released. Music appearing in the film includes:

- "The New Science" – Ola Podrida
- "Too Many Stars" – Let's Go Sailing
- "21 People" – Eugene
- "Party Hard" – The Perceptionists
- "What What" – Eric V. Hachikian
- "Chedda" – Big City
- "Disaster" – The Besnard Lakes
- "Wild Winter" – Anubian Lights
- "Ping Pong" – Operator Please
- "Red Tandy" – Mother Hips
- "On the Road" – The Bossmen
- "Sap" – The Freakwater
- "Bye Bye Bye" – Sia and Chad Fischer
- "Losing Sleep" - Social Club Misfits
