= Mumbo Jumbo (album) =

2010 studio album by Air Supply

Studio album by Air Supply
- Released: 4 May 2010
- Recorded: 2008–2010
- Studio: Oddson Studios Woodland Magic
- Genre: Soft rock
- Length: 61:58
- Label: A Nice Pear
- Producer: Graham Russell

Air Supply chronology
Across the Concrete Sky (2003)	Mumbo Jumbo (2010)	A Matter of Time (2026)

Singles from Mumbo Jumbo
- 1. "Dance with Me" Released: 2010; 2. "Faith in Love" Released: 2010

Mumbo Jumbo is the seventeenth studio album by English-Australian soft rock duo Air Supply, released in 2010. Two singles from the album, "Dance with Me" and "Faith in Love", became top-30 hits on the Billboard Adult Contemporary chart. The band's first studio record in seven years, it was the third album released on the Graham Russell label A Nice Pear/Odds On Records.

== Critical reception ==
Professional ratings
Review scores
Source	Rating
AllMusic	3.5/5 stars

AllMusic's Stephen Thomas Erlewine felt the band "employs some smoke and mirrors on this album, perhaps more than any of their previous albums, dabbling with a variety of textures and rhythms." At the end of his review on this album, he described it as "[among] their most adventurous records, and one of their best works."

== Track listing ==
All songs written by Graham Russell, except where noted.

No.	Title	Writer(s)	Length
1.	"Setting the Seen"		5:26
2.	"Dance with Me"	Russell, Frankie Moreno	5:35
3.	"A Little Bit of Everything"		3:58
4.	"Hold On"		4:42
5.	"A Little Bit More"		4:48
6.	"Alternate Ending"	Russell, Lightfoot	4:36
7.	"I Won't Let It Get in the Way"	Russell, Moreno	4:19
8.	"Why"		4:12
9.	"Me Like You"	Russell, Moreno	3:13
10.	"Mumbo Jumbo"	Russell, Lightfoot	4:02
11.	"Faith in Love"		4:30
12.	"Can I Be Your Lover"		5:18
13.	"Lovesex"	Russell, Moreno	4:06
14.	"Until"	Russell, Moreno	3:18
Total length:			61:58

== Personnel ==
Air Supply

- Russell Hitchcock – vocals
- Graham Russell – vocals, acoustic guitar, keyboards (1, 3, 11, 12), string composer (3–5, 12), string conductor (12)

Additional musicians

- Frankie Moreno – acoustic piano (2–4, 6, 7, 9, 13, 14), string arrangements (3–5, 14), conductor (3–6, 14), string composer (3–5), Wurlitzer electric piano (4), backing vocals (9)
- Jonni Lightfoot – bass (1–4, 6–10, 13), piccolo bass (10), guitar (3), keyboards (3, 10)
- Mike Zerbe – drums
- Jed Moss – acoustic piano (8, 11, 12)
- Jeff Alleman – guitar (1, 6, 8, 10)
- Russell Letizia – guitar (2, 4, 7, 9, 13)
- Marty Lyman – guitar (6)
- Lindsey Springer – cello (5, 14)
- Louis Clark: string arrangements (6)
- DeAnne Letourneau – concertmaster (3–6, 12, 14)
- Stina Nordenstam – backing vocals (1, 3, 10)
- Michael Johns – guest vocals (4)
- Sara Hudson – guest vocals (5)
- The Celtic Tenors – guest vocals (8)
- Deirdrie Gilsenen – featured vocals (8)

== Production ==
- Producer – Graham Russell
- Engineers – Jim "Bonzai" Caruso and Jonni Lightfoot
- Mixing – Jim "Bonzai" Caruso (Tracks 1, 7–10, 12–14); Sean O'Dwyer and Matt Salveson (Tracks 2–6 & 11).
- Mastered by Brian Gardner at Bernie Grundman Mastering (Hollywood, CA).
- CD Artwork – Lady Jodi Russell
- Cover Photography – Tyler Gourley
- Neon and Center Photos – Nyk Fry
- Management – Barry Siegel
