= 8 Heads in a Duffel Bag =

1997 black comedy film by Tom Schulman

- Theatrical release poster
- Directed by: Tom Schulman
- Written by: Tom Schulman
- Produced by: Jeffrey D. Ivers; Brad Krevoy; Steve Stabler
- Starring: Joe Pesci; Kristy Swanson; David Spade; George Hamilton; Dyan Cannon; Andy Comeau; Todd Louiso
- Cinematography: Adam Holender
- Edited by: David Holden
- Music by: Andrew Gross
- Distributed by: Orion Pictures (United States); Carlton Film Distributors (United Kingdom)
- Release dates: April 18, 1997 (USA); November 28, 1997 (United Kingdom)
- Running time: 95 minutes
- Countries: United States; United Kingdom
- Language: English
- Budget: $22 million
- Box office: $4 million

8 Heads in a Duffel Bag is a 1997 black comedy film starring Joe Pesci, Kristy Swanson and David Spade. It was the directorial debut of screenwriter Tom Schulman. The film was a box office disappointment and received negative reviews from critics.

The film initially focuses on a wiseguy who has been tasked with transporting a cargo of severed heads to a crime boss. The duffel bag with the heads is switched with that of a young tourist heading for Mexico. The young man and his girlfriend soon look for ways to get rid of the heads, while the wiseguy attempts to find replacement heads at a cryonics lab.

== Plot ==
Tommy Spinelli is a wiseguy hired by Benny and Rico, a pair of dimwitted hitmen, to transport a duffel bag full of severed heads across the United States to crime boss "Big Sep" (as proof of the deaths). While on a commercial flight, his bag is accidentally switched with that of Charlie Pritchett, a friendly, talkative, young American tourist who is going to Mexico to see his girlfriend Laurie and her parents, Dick and Annette.

Spinelli harasses Charlie's friends Ernie and Steve for information, while Charlie and Laurie attempt to get rid of their rather unfortunate luggage.

After Charlie meets with Laurie and her parents at the airport with the wrong bag, they go to their rooms at the resort in Acapulco, Mexico. Soon, Annette mistakenly thinks that Charlie might be a serial killer on the run once she sees a head in his bag while hiding a gift for him inside the bag. Her husband thinks it's all a delusion brought on by her alcoholism.

At first, Charlie and Laurie try to bury the heads in the desert, but a group of thugs steals their car. Then Charlie comes up with an idea that he will give back the heads without anyone noticing, by pretending he forgot to turn in his report back at his college. In turn, everyone packs up for the airport. At the airport, Charlie accidentally puts a severed head in Dick's carry-on bag, causing him to get arrested. They never leave Acapulco since they have to come up with a new plan to save Dick.

Meanwhile, Tommy, Ernie and Steve start to look for replacement heads, after Charlie tells Tommy he lost one. They start to look in a cryonics lab, where they store bodies and severed heads, much to Tommy's approval. After getting the replacement heads, Tommy and the others get on a plane and head to Mexico. Tommy threatens Charlie that if he loses more heads, he'll replace them with Charlie's friends and family. After hearing of the airport incident, Benny and Rico decide to collect the heads for themselves.

When Fern, Dick's mother, arrives in Mexico, Tommy takes her and the others hostage as he helps Charlie find more heads. They find out that a coyote took one of the heads from the stolen car. Tommy also realizes that Benny and Rico are going to kill him if he doesn't get the heads across the border in time. Charlie comes up with a plan to save both their lives.

Charlie and Laurie take a severed head to the airport to prove her father's innocence. Benny and Rico try to intervene, but end up getting arrested. It is revealed that Tommy and Charlie set them up. Charlie thanks him for his help, as Tommy departs to Hawaii. Steve goes insane and starts running around the airport with a severed head, telling security guards that it is his "best friend".

Charlie and Laurie get married, with her mother and father present; Steve is in a straitjacket; Ernie is a brain surgeon; Fern is also present in a full body cast after being thrown out of a moving van when she started to bad-mouth Tommy; and Tommy is enjoying his retirement.

== Cast ==
- Joe Pesci as Tommy Spinelli
- Andy Comeau as Charlie Pritchett
- Kristy Swanson as Laurie Bennett
- George Hamilton as Dick Bennett
- Dyan Cannon as Annette Bennett
- David Spade as Ernie Lipscomb
- Todd Louiso as Steve
- Anthony Mangano as Rico
- Joe Basile as Benny
- Ernestine Mercer as Fern Bennett
- Howard George as "Big Sep"

== Production ==
In April 1993, it was announced Tom Schulman would write an original idea for Caravan Pictures that would serve as his directorial debut. Will Smith was originally offered the role of Ernie for $10 million, but turned down the project after his manager James Lassiter advised him not to take the deal. The role was later given to David Spade.

Part of the finance came from the Rank Organisation.

== Reception ==
=== Box office ===
The film was a profound box office failure, earning a total of $4 million worldwide against a production budget of $22 million.

=== Critical response ===
On Rotten Tomatoes, the film holds an approval rating of 7% based on 29 reviews, with an average rating of 4.1/10. On Metacritic, the film has a weighted average score of 15 out of 100 based on reviews from 17 critics, indicating "overwhelming dislike". Audiences polled by CinemaScore gave the film an average grade of "C" on an A+ to F scale.

Leonard Klady of Variety wrote: "There's a germ of a very funny idea in "8 Heads in a Duffel Bag" that extends well beyond its offbeat title. But pic's amusing premise is undone by lackluster direction, a script unwilling to go the limit of its bizarre central idea and some botched casting." Klady does have some praise for the makeup work creating the severed heads from the title. Rita Kempley of The Washington Post called it "Sheer torture, the very definition of unfunniness itself." Entertainment Weekly's Bruce Fretts gave the film a rating of 'F' and further stated that it "aims for dark farce but ends up playing more like Weekend at Bernie's VIII".

Roger Ebert of the Chicago Sun-Times gave the film two out of four stars and praised Pesci's performance, saying "he's funny every moment he's on the screen". Ebert says the film "takes a lot of chances, and if they'd all worked it might have been a great comedy".

== See also ==
- Tarantinoesque film
