= Andy Comeau =

American actor

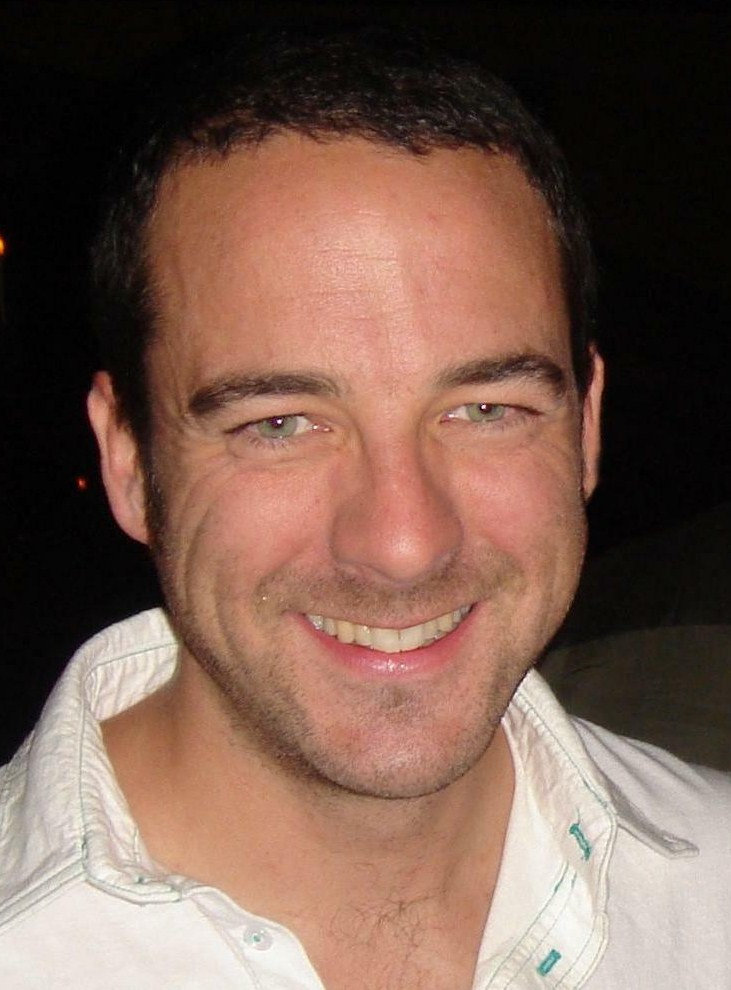
- Comeau in 2005
- Born: October 19, 1970 (age 55); New Boston, New Hampshire, U.S.
- Occupation: Actor
- Spouse: Dawn Lewis (2007-present)
- Children: 1

Andy Comeau (born October 19, 1970) is an American actor and musician. He is best known for playing Theodore "Teddy" Huffstodt on the Showtime series Huff (2004–2006). He was also featured in the fourth season of the series House as Dr. Travis Brennan in 2007.

== Life and career ==
Comeau played the role of Forrest Gump in the 1996 music video for the "Weird Al" Yankovic song "Gump."

Comeau appeared as Charlie in 8 Heads in a Duffel Bag (1997) alongside Joe Pesci, David Spade and Kristy Swanson. The following year he played Tim Connors in Blackout Effect (1998) and Tom Inman in Virtual Obsession (1998).

In 1999, he appeared in the fourth episode of the second season of Will and Grace as Andy Fellner, Grace's childhood friend whom Grace's mom fixes up with Will. Back on the silver screen, Comeau had a brief but pivotal role in the Robin Williams thriller One Hour Photo (2002).

He also guest-starred in Criminal Minds in the season 1 episode "Charm and Harm" where he played a serial killer named Mark Gregory who abducted random women before holding them prisoner for several days while subjecting them to torture before drowning them.

In 2004, the actor came back to cinema with My Tiny Universe (2004), a dark comedy.

Comeau portrayed Teddy Huffstodt, the mentally unbalanced brother of Hank Azaria's Dr. Craig Huffstodt on the television series Huff.

He later appeared in several 2007 episodes of House. His character, Dr. Travis Brennan, was an epidemiologist who was one of several doctors vying to work under Hugh Laurie's protagonist, Gregory House. In 2010, Comeau portrayed a plastic surgery patient in the final season of Nip/Tuck and appeared in a Progressive Auto Insurance advertisement.

He also appeared in the film The Babysitters (2007) with Katherine Waterston and John Leguizamo.

Comeau's theater credits include The Cherry Orchard, Biloxi Blues, The Tempest and A Midsummer Night's Dream.

He is the bandleader and saxophonist for the Los Angeles-based band Vaud and the Villains, a 19-piece New Orleans 1930s themed musical act with dancers and spoken word artists. His stage name with the group is Vaud Overstreet.
