= Huff (TV series) =

American comedy-drama television series

- Huff's intertitle
- Created by: Bob Lowry
- Starring: Hank Azaria; Paget Brewster; Anton Yelchin; Andy Comeau; Kimberly Brooks; Faith Prince; Liza Lapira; Blythe Danner; Oliver Platt
- Country of origin: United States
- Original language: English
- No. of seasons: 2
- No. of episodes: 26

Production
- Running time: 52 minutes
- Production companies: Bob Lowry Television; 50 Cannon Entertainment; Sony Pictures Television; Showtime Networks

Original release
- Network: Showtime
- Release: November 7, 2004 – June 25, 2006

Huff (stylized as HUFF!) is an American comedy-drama television series starring Hank Azaria that aired on Showtime from November 7, 2004, to June 25, 2006. It won three Primetime Emmy Awards from ten nominations, as well as being nominated for a Golden Globe Award and a Screen Actors Guild Award.

The storyline is centered around psychiatrist Craig Huffstodt. He is a good therapist and middle-aged family man in the middle of a mid-life crisis. His own family's private lives are chaotic, including a mentally incurable brother Teddy, who fascinates Craig's adolescent son, Byrd.

== Cast and characters ==
Besides Azaria, the cast included Paget Brewster, Blythe Danner (who won the Emmy Award in 2005 and 2006 for Outstanding Supporting Actress in a Drama Series for her role as Izzy), Oliver Platt, Anton Yelchin, Andy Comeau, Kimberly Brooks, Liza Lapira, and Faith Prince.

Those making recurring guest appearances on the show during its first season included Lara Flynn Boyle, Robert Forster, Swoosie Kurtz, Annie Potts, and Faith Prince. In its second season, Huff also managed to attract high-profile recurring guest stars, including Sharon Stone and Anjelica Huston.

=== Main ===
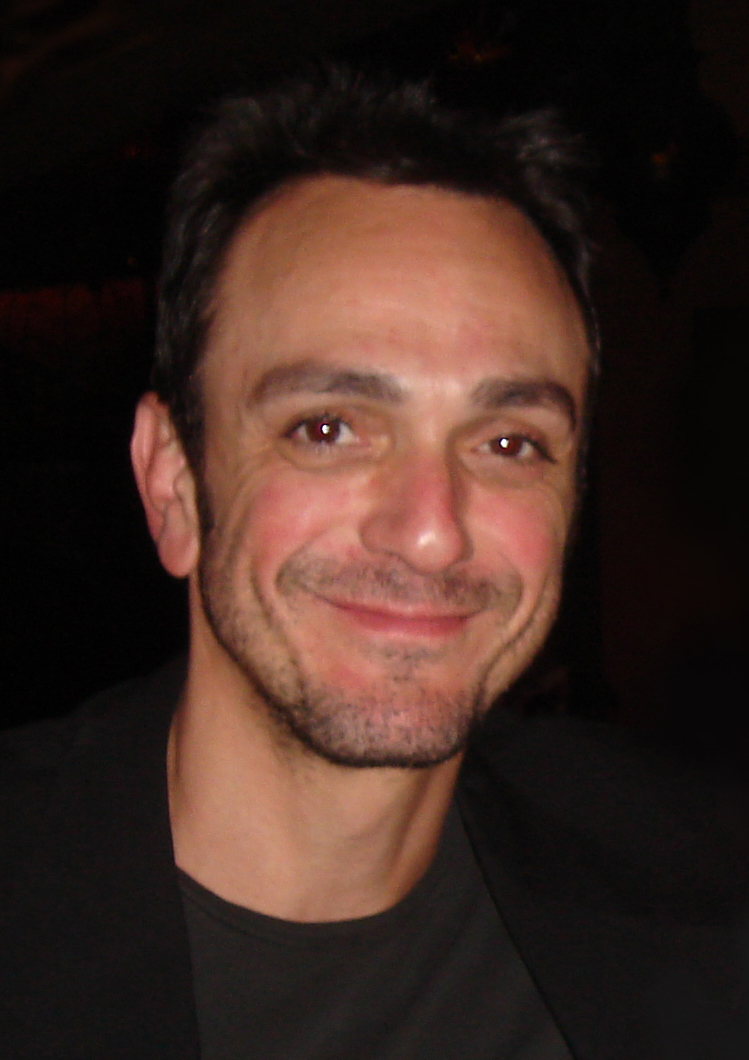
Hank Azaria played the title role.

- Hank Azaria as Dr. Craig "Huff" Huffstodt: a Los Angeles psychiatrist whose life is sent reeling when a tragedy occurs in his office. An eternal caretaker who thinks he can save people, Huff learns very brutally that he can't save everyone. He deals with the functionally insane all day, and when he comes home, he's faced with the daily insanities of family life.
- Paget Brewster as Beth Huffstodt: Huff's loving yet capricious wife. She helps Huff avoid meltdowns while providing welcome, wifely support and amenities.
- Oliver Platt as Russell Tupper: Huff's lawyer, longtime friend, and former running buddy from their single days. Although a source of questionable ethics and morality, he still gets it done with a sense of humor and comes through for Huff.
- Blythe Danner as Isabelle "Izzy" Huffstodt: Huff's mother, who has lived in the apartment above the garage since the breakup of her marriage. Izzy is tough and manipulative but also funny and irreverent.
- Anton Yelchin as Byrd Huffstodt: Huff and Beth's 14-year-old son. He is a loving child who is concerned with his father's well-being and about what's going on in the family. He's a very bright teenager.
- Andy Comeau as Theodore "Teddy" Huffstodt: Huff's younger brother. Literally and figuratively locked away in a private mental institution, Teddy's mental illness brings clarity of thought to Huff during his visits.
- Kimberly Brooks as Paula Dellahouse: Huff's office manager who protects him as much as she provokes him. She has been with Huff for a long time and knows him and his family very well.
- Liza Lapira as Maggie Del Rosario: Russell's utterly devoted yet pull-no-punches assistant. She cares for him, covers for him and curses him, but it's all in a day's work for her as she knows she's probably the only woman Russell has ever allowed himself to truly depend on.
- Faith Prince as Kelly Knippers: a television sales rep whom Russell meets and woos while shopping for a flat screen. A wild night of partying and debauchery results in a pregnancy that changes both their lives.

=== Recurring ===
==== Season 1 ====
- Robert Forster as Ben Huffstodt
- Swoosie Kurtz as Madeleine Sullivan
- Jack Laufer as The Homeless Hungarian
- Annie Potts as Doris Johnson
- Misti Traya as Gail
- Lara Flynn Boyle as Melody Coatar
- January Jones as Marisa Wells

==== Season 2 ====
- Tom Skerritt as Ben Huffstodt
- Jack Laufer as The Homeless Hungarian
- Ashley Williams as Alyssa
- Anjelica Huston as Dr. Lena Markova
- Sharon Stone as Dauri Rathburn
- Alex Black as Tim Winnick
- Missy Crider as Natalie

== Production and broadcast ==
The series was created by Bob Lowry and features Hank Azaria as Dr. Craig "Huff" Huffstodt, a psychiatrist whose life changes abruptly when a 15-year-old client commits suicide in his office. The series follows Huff, his family, and his friend Russell Tupper, played by Oliver Platt, as they navigate life.

The first season was broadcast on Showtime between November 7, 2004, and January 30, 2005. The second season premiered on April 2, 2006, and ended on June 25, 2006. Two days before the finale, Showtime announced that the show would not be picked up for a third season, and several plotlines, including the resolution of pending criminal charges against Russell Tupper and the possibility of reconciliation between Huff and Beth, were left unresolved.

The two-hour pilot episode was filmed in Vancouver, British Columbia. Later, production for Huff was moved to Delfino Stages in Los Angeles, California.

== Episodes ==
Season	Episodes	Originally released	
Season	Episodes	First released	Last released
1	13	November 7, 2004	January 30, 2005
2	13	April 2, 2006	June 25, 2006

=== Season 1 (2004–2005) ===
No.	Title	Directed by	Written by	Original release date
1	"Pilot"	Scott Winant	Bob Lowry	November 7, 2004
Dr. Craig "Huff" Huffstodt is a Los Angeles psychiatrist whose life and career come under fire after a 15-year-old gay patient of his commits suicide in his office. While at home, Huff tries to deal with his family's insanities, including his very opinionated mother, Izzy, who interferes in his wife Beth's personal affairs.
2	"Assault and Pepper"	Scott Winant	David Maples	November 14, 2004
Huff has to go to the medical board and defend himself and his practice with Russell as his attorney. At work, Huff has his hands full with Melody Coatar, who is a dangerous bipolar patient. Huff is later informed that he is being sued by the parents of the boy who committed suicide in his office.
3	"Lipstick on Your Panties"	Paris Barclay	David Maples	November 21, 2004
Byrd sneaks off to a rainbow party. When Beth finds out what her 14-year-old son did there, she is very upset, though Huff tries to convince her that nothing is wrong. Izzy's best friend, Lois, ends up having a major stroke. Huff has to prepare for his testimony in the wrongful death lawsuit. Meanwhile, Russell has a party at his house that involves a ton of liquor and drugs.
4	"Control"	Tucker Gates	Thania St. John	November 28, 2004
Huff is upset when he discovers that a surprise witness has been called in the wrongful death lawsuit. Russell hits Huff with tough questions in his preparation for the suit. Beth and Izzy fight about Izzy's not reserving privacy in the early morning. Meanwhile, Byrd ends up tutoring one of his high school classmates, Gail.
5	"Flashpants"	Daniel Attias	Mark Richard	December 5, 2004
Huff gets a surprising visit from his father, who wants him to be a go-between for him and Izzy. Beth discovers that her mother has found a lump in her breast. Russell tries to rescue a client, a sitcom star (played by Bob Saget), who is now addicted to drugs and alcohol. At work, Huff discovers that Melody wants a transitional session between him and her new therapist and gets a visit from Doris, the mother of his now-dead patient, who wants to know more about her son.
6	"Is She Dead?"	Scott Winant	Bob Lowry	December 12, 2004
Pepper, a prostitute Russell patronized not too long ago, comes to him for his legal services because she is facing grand larceny charges. Beth tries to stay busy as she deals with her mother's cancer and Izzy getting on her last nerve. Teddy goes missing from a field trip. Huff and Doris try to heal one another as they finally come to an understanding.
7	"That Fucking Cabin"	Mark Piznarski	Jessica Mecklenburg	December 19, 2004
After he keeps having a surreal dream about his childhood, Huff decides to take off on a visit to the woods for a camping trip at the family cabin with his father and son. This marks the first time all three generations of the family are together at the cabin. Meanwhile, Russell embarks on a liver detoxification and cleansing program, with a surprising result. Also, Beth ends up having a strange encounter with one of Huff's patients while home alone.
8	"Cold Day in Shanghai"	Dan Lerner	Nicole Mirante	December 26, 2004
Huff is not happy when Melody returns in his sexual fantasies, and at the most inopportune times. Russell is coming out of his body cleansing and purification regime in time to take Laura, one of the partners in his law firm, out to dinner. Byrd is under tremendous peer pressure to steal drug samples from his father. Meanwhile, Beth has a verbal run-in with the cops in a convenience store. Russell lobbies Izzy to sign her divorce papers.
9	"Christmas Is Ruined"	Matt Shakman	Thania St. John	January 2, 2005
Huff's optimistic enthusiasm for this year's Christmas celebration meets its match when Beth's family, including her sick mother and competitive sister, arrives for the festivities. Izzy strains to be hospitable and good-natured, particularly when Russell comes with an unusual date, and pays one last visit to her best friend in the hospital. Byrd plays host of his own when his lost flame Gail shows up with an unexpected present.
10	"The Good Doctor"	Ellen S. Pressman	Byron Balasco	January 9, 2005
Huff grapples with the dangers of psychiatry when a young, eager, and attractive pharmaceutical rep does her best to persuade him to aggressively prescribe. But Beth discovers an item in Izzy's closet that may be alarming enough to distract him from his flirtation. Over in the land of Russell, Huff's lawyer friend may be the victim of federal surveillance or simply the victim of his own paranoia.
11	"The Sample Closet"	Sarah Pia Anderson	Nicole Mirante & Thania St. John	January 16, 2005
With the guilt of his near-miss infidelity weighing down on him, Huff misinterprets Beth's partnership with a young, attractive business client. Russell does the best he can to counsel his best friend while getting news that puts him in a position where somebody has him by the balls for the first time in his life and there's nothing he can do to change it.
12	"All the King's Horses"	Martha Coolidge	Byron Balasco	January 23, 2005
As Beth prepares for the arrival of her gravely ill mother, the rift between her and Huff escalates, putting them both in a position we've never seen them in before. With Huff realizing that there's no way he will ever be able to "put the toothpaste back into the tube", Russell confronts the horrifying possibility that he may have unintentionally started a family during a recent ecstasy binge.
13	"Crazy Nuts & All Fucked Up"	Scott Winant	Bob Lowry	January 30, 2005
Huff's sanity is seriously called into question by his family after a series of unfortunate and wildly unpredictable events and circumstances, one involving Melody, threaten to make a big tear in the fabric of the Huffstodt family. Russell has to decide if he wants to be a father or not. Izzy refuses to allow Teddy to take a new anti-psychotic drug, one that could also possibly kill him. Beth learns her mother's cancer has spread to the spine. Byrd is a little stunned by the adults pinballing around him. Huff screams at Russell that he is in for a fall.

=== Season 2 (2006) ===
No.	Title	Directed by	Written by	Original release date
14	"Maps Don't Talk (Part 1)"	Scott Winant	Bob Lowry	April 2, 2006
Huff still feels guilty and angry, and so do his family and friends, about his potentially fatal fight with his best friend, Russell. Beth's mother is dying, and Beth is having a difficult time dealing with it. Izzy and Byrd have become estranged from the family. Meanwhile, Russell takes on a troubled new client, Dauri Rathbun. To be continued...
15	"Maps Don't Talk (Part 2)"	Scott Winant	Bob Lowry	April 2, 2006
Huff begins his search for Teddy in Mexico but cannot find him. He ends up being forced to ask Russell, whom he nearly killed and who wants to have nothing to do with him, for help in locating his brother before something drastic happens. Meanwhile, Beth finds that Madeline has taken a turn for the worse and does not know what to do.
16	"Whipped Doggie"	Dan Lerner	Byron Balasco	April 9, 2006
Huff is less than pleased with what Teddy chooses as his assisted living facility. Russell ends up asking Huff to give a professional opinion of his new client's behavior. Teddy has a moving moment with Byrd, and Beth's mother's health dramatically changes.
17	"Sweet Release"	Sarah Pia Anderson	Jessica Mecklenburg	April 16, 2006
Huff's romantic weekend alone with Beth ends up getting very steamy. Izzy meets a man while at a Palm Springs casino. Byrd ends up breaking into a neighbor's house and is caught.
18	"Used, Abused and Unenthused"	Steve Gomer	Jessica Mecklenburg & Nicole Mirante	April 23, 2006
Huff discovers that Teddy is becoming more independent after a conversation he has with Dr. Lena Markova. Beth has a problem with a client at her job, and Russell gets an ultimatum from his boss that does not sit well with him.
19	"Red Meat"	Dan Lerner	Nicole Mirante	April 30, 2006
Huff gets an unexpected visit from his father. Teddy ends up meeting a very attractive young lady while down at the beach. Izzy finds herself arrested on a DUI charge. Beth decides that she will host a meeting of Paula's prayer group. Russell tracks down his young client, who is at a drug house, and then ends up joining in the festivities.
20	"So… What Brings You to Armageddon?"	Sarah Pia Anderson	Mark Richard	May 7, 2006
Huff's father decides that he will extend his stay, and some family members feel he is wearing out his welcome. Lena asks Huff to address her alternative psychiatric therapy students. Byrd offends some people with his latest art project. Meanwhile, Russell ends up going on a drug-fueled bender.
21	"A Cornfield Grows in L.A."	James Hayman	Nicole Mirante & Jessica Mecklenburg & Bob Lowry	May 14, 2006
Huff and Beth get into a major fight at their therapist's office. Teddy and Alyssa's relationship begins to heat up. Also, Russell decides to pay a visit to Kelly.
22	"Radio Silence"	Tom Moore	Byron Balasco	May 21, 2006
Huff has become ill, both emotionally and physically, because of his relationship with Beth. Some of the things Teddy has told others about his relationship with Alyssa finally catches up with him. Russell fails to a keep an important promise that he made to Kelly. Meanwhile, Ben's attempt to reach out to Izzy fails.
23	"Bethless"	Gloria Muzio	Annie Brunner	June 4, 2006
Huff decides that he is going to leave Beth, but neither Byrd nor Izzy is happy about it. After Alyssa finds out about what Teddy has been lying about, it might lead to the end of their relationship. Meanwhile, Russell faces the consequences of what he did to Kelly.
24	"Tapping the Squid"	Sarah Pia Anderson	Nicole Mirante	June 11, 2006
Beth is shocked when Izzy offers to help her in her time of need. Byrd and Eli decide to get even with James for all he has done. Huff and Russell hit the town.
25	"Black Shadows"	Tricia Brock	Jessica Mecklenburg	June 18, 2006
Huff and Russell's friendship is in danger of ending for good. Izzy decides that Byrd needs discipline of the physical kind. Beth ends up getting closer to Alec. Meanwhile, Teddy's mental actions send Alyssa on her way.
26	"Which Lip Is the Cervical Lip?"	Scott Winant	Bob Lowry	June 25, 2006
Teddy attempts to murder his girlfriend. Russell helps Kelly deliver their baby. Byrd blows up over his family's actions and demands to be sent to boarding school. Beth tells Huff she doesn't want him to come home. Izzy finally decides to speak with Teddy. Huff decides he doesn't know how he is doing anymore.

== Reception ==
=== Ratings ===
U.S. Ratings
Season	Episodes	First aired		Last aired		Ave. viewers (thousands)
Season	Episodes	Date	Viewers (thousands)	Date	Viewers (thousands)	Ave. viewers (thousands)
1	13	November 7, 2004	456	January 30, 2005	462	287
2	13	April 2, 2006	372	June 25, 2006	212	220

=== Awards and nominations ===
Year	Association	Category	Recipients	Result
2005	Artios Awards	Best Dramatic Pilot Casting	Susan Edelman, Michelle Allen (Canadian Casting)	Nominated
2005	Golden Globe Awards	Best Supporting Actor in a Series, Miniseries or Television Film	Oliver Platt	Nominated
2005	Primetime Emmy Awards	Outstanding Lead Actor in a Drama Series	Hank Azaria (Episode: "Crazy Nuts & All Fucked Up")	Nominated
2005	Primetime Emmy Awards	Outstanding Supporting Actor in a Drama Series	Oliver Platt (Episode: "That Fucking Cabin" + "Crazy Nuts & All Fucked Up")	Nominated
2005	Primetime Emmy Awards	Outstanding Supporting Actress in a Drama Series	Blythe Danner (Episodes: "Is She Dead?" + "Christmas Is Ruined")	Won
2005	Primetime Emmy Awards	Outstanding Directing for a Drama Series	Scott Winant (Episode: "Crazy Nuts & All Fucked Up")	Nominated
2005	Primetime Emmy Awards	Outstanding Guest Actress in a Drama Series	Swoosie Kurtz	Nominated
2005	Primetime Emmy Awards	Outstanding Main Title Design	Tracy Chandler, Jose Gomez, Christopher Markos and André Stringer	Won
2005	Primetime Emmy Awards	Outstanding Main Title Theme Music	W.G. Snuffy Walden	Nominated
2005	Screen Actors Guild Awards	Outstanding Performance by a Male Actor in a Drama Series	Hank Azaria	Nominated
2006	Primetime Emmy Awards	Outstanding Supporting Actor in a Drama Series	Oliver Platt (Episodes: "Red Meat" + "So… What Brings You to Armageddon?")	Nominated
2006	Primetime Emmy Awards	Outstanding Supporting Actress in a Drama Series	Blythe Danner (Episodes: "Maps Don't Talk" (Part 2)" + "So… What Brings You to Armageddon?")	Won
2006	Primetime Emmy Awards	Outstanding Guest Actress in a Drama Series	Swoosie Kurtz	Nominated

== Home media ==
Huff - Season One was released on Region 1 DVD on March 21, 2006. All 13 episodes from the first season are presented in Anamorphic widescreen (1.78:1) with Dolby Digital 5.1 Audio. Extras include commentary tracks on four episodes, three featurettes, five minutes of deleted scenes and a gag reel.

Huff - The Complete 2nd Season was made available in 2012 as a three-disc DVD set, but is only produced via a "manufacture on demand" format through Sony Pictures Home Entertainment.
