= Cal Calamia =

Athlete, activist, teacher and poet

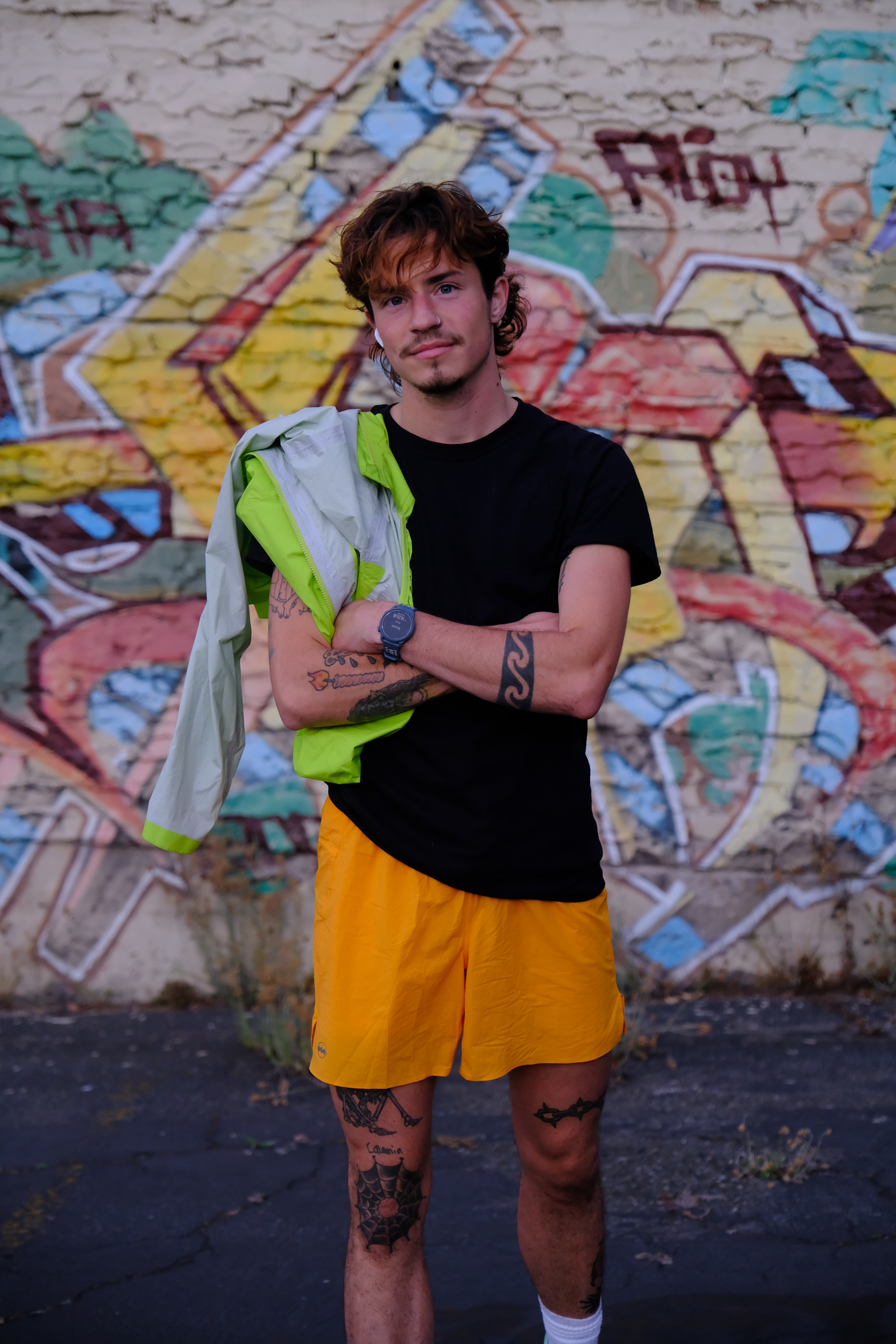

Personal information
- Born: 1996 (age 29–30)
- Home town: Grayslake, Illinois

Sport
- Sport: Running

Cal Calamia (born 1996) is a non-binary transmasculine runner, sports activist, poet, and educator. He (Note: Calamia uses both he/him and they/them pronouns. This article uses he/him for consistency.) was the first winner of the non-binary division of the San Francisco Marathon and has been an advocate for transgender and non-binary runners since 2022.

== Running career and activism ==
Calamia competed in cross country both in high school in Grayslake, Illinois and in college at Saint Louis University in Missouri. He then began a gender transition and became an advocate for more visibility and inclusion for transgender and non-binary runners, beginning with San Francisco's Bay to Breakers race in 2022. Calamia's activism has led to more races adding non-binary divisions and equitably recognizing non-binary participants' achievements, and he is an outspoken advocate for the addition of non-binary categories in the World Marathon Majors.

Calamia has received significant press coverage, being featured in The New York Times, PinkNews, The Advocate, and Like the Wind magazine, as well as local news in San Francisco. He is involved in the conversation about the inclusion of trans and non-binary athletes in sports, and might be described as debunking myths about athleticism by running a sub 3-hour marathon, effectively qualifying for the Boston Marathon against all three gender standards (men, women, and non-binary).

In December 2022, Calamia founded the first ever non-binary run club, called nbrc; the club meets for regular runs in the Bay Area.

=== Athletic achievements ===
In May 2022, Calamia became the first ever non-binary winner of Bay to Breakers in San Francisco. In July 2022, he became the first ever non-binary winner of the San Francisco Marathon. In October 2022, he placed second in the non-binary category at the Chicago Marathon.

In October 2023, Calamia was granted a landmark exemption for his use of testosterone while competing.

In November 2023, Calamia won the non-binary division of the New York City Marathon. However, he was declared ineligible for the prize money, as he did not meet the requirement of running six New York Road Runners races in the year leading up to the marathon. Calamia said that he was unaware of this rule, which was added after he registered for the race.

In March 2024, Calamia won the non-binary division of the Los Angeles Marathon with a time of 2:53:02.

In September 2024, Calamia set a personal record of 2:41:59 at the Berlin Marathon.

In March 2026, Calamia won the non-binary division of the Los Angeles Marathon for the second time, with a time of 2:49:17.

Also in March 2026, Calamia teamed up with two other trans athletes, swimmer Schuyler Bailar and cyclist Chella Man, to compete in the relay at the Ironman 70.3 in Oceanside, California. The team placed third out of 200 relay teams.

=== Activism ===
Calamia is known for his role in increasing the inclusivity of trans and non-binary runners in trail and road races. He began pushing back against Bay to Breakers in May 2022. Initially, the historic race did not have plans to award non-binary competitors for their achievements, but Calamia rallied his local and online community to garner press coverage and change the race's award structure just one day before the race.

He has continued working with other races, both local and international, to provide advice, consulting support, and dialogue with organizers as they roll out non-binary categories, including the San Francisco Marathon, the Chicago Marathon, and the Boston Marathon.

== Gender transition ==
Calamia felt discomfort with his gender from a young age, but did not have the resources or education to transition until adulthood. At age 22, Calamia began taking testosterone and had chest masculinization surgery, at which point he began to identify as non-binary transmasculine and used he/him and they/them pronouns.

== Education and poetry ==
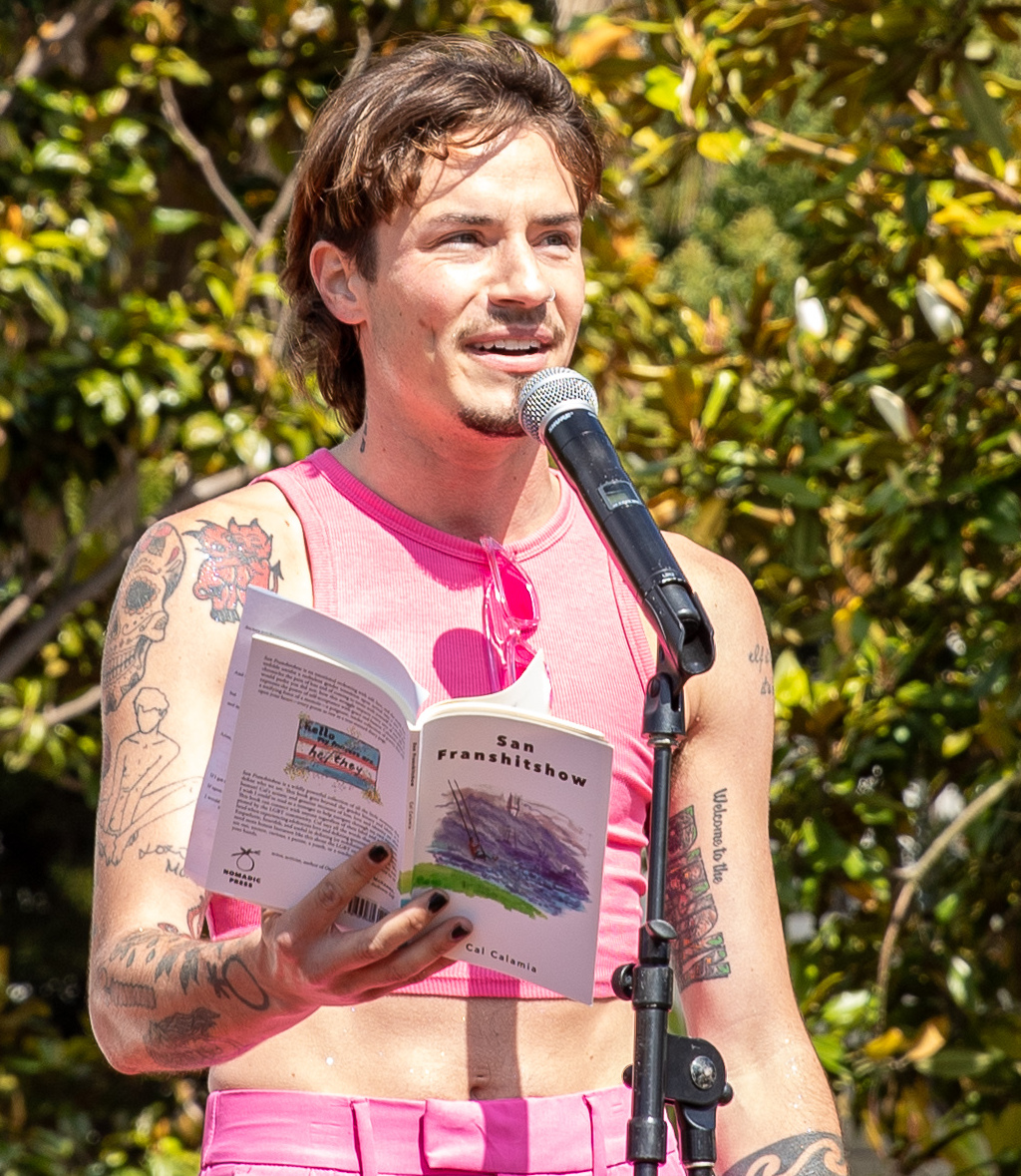
Calamia reads from his poetry collection at the 2023 San Francisco Trans March.

In addition to running and sports activism, Calamia is a public school teacher and the author of a poetry collection called San Franshitshow.

Calamia performs at Bay Area poetry readings. His debut collection San Franshitshow was published in 2021 by Nomadic Press.
