= Vaud and the Villains =

American stage musical show

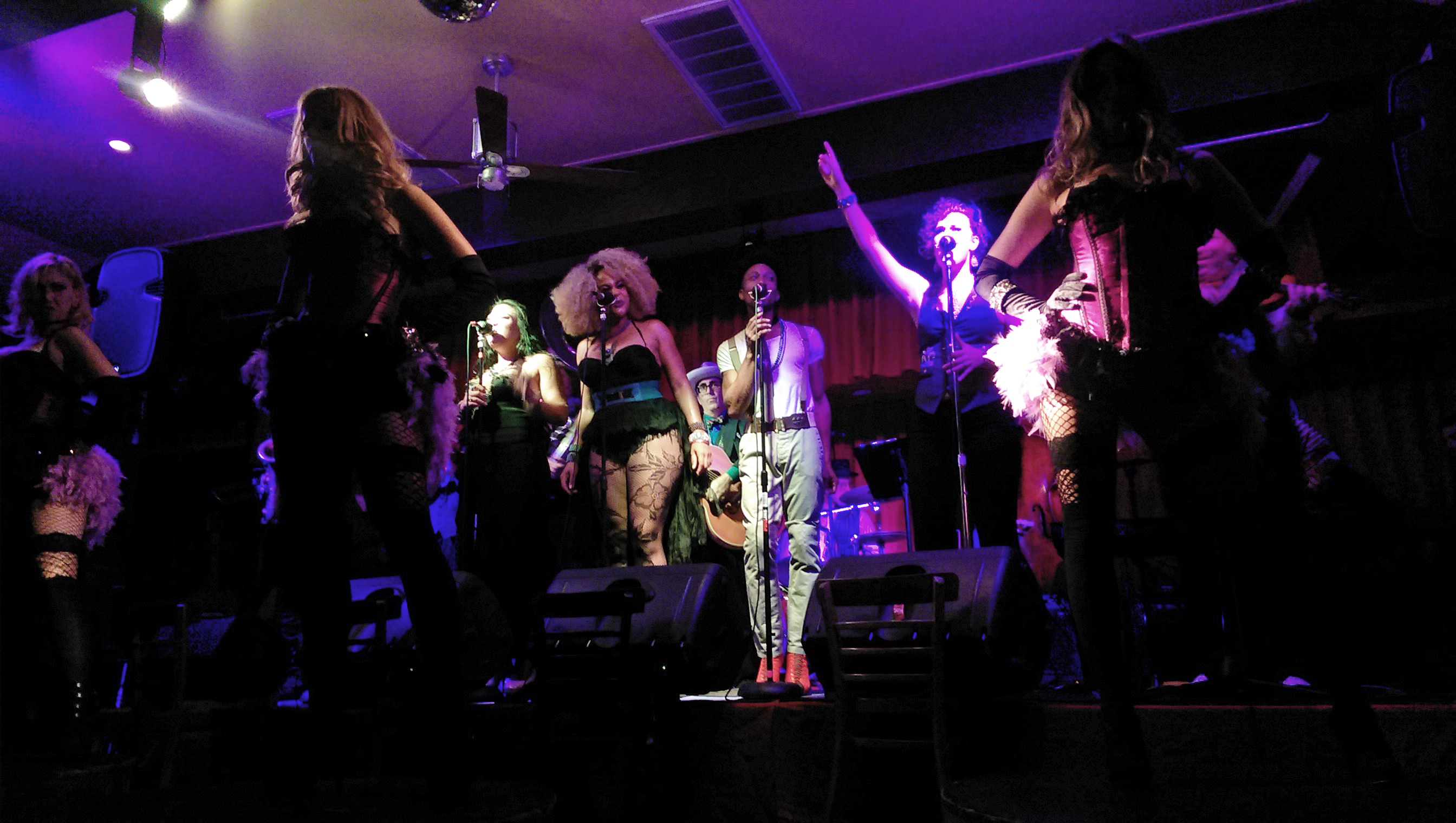
- Vaud and the Villains live in Sonoma, California in 2015

Background information
- Origin: Los Angeles, California, United States
- Genres: New Orleans-style stage musical, Americana, cabaret
- Years active: c.2008–present
- Members: Andy Comeau (Vaud Overstreet), Dawn Lewis (Peaches Mahoney)
- Website: vaudandthevillains.com

Vaud and the Villains is a 15 to 20 piece New Orleans themed stage musical show from the United States.

Based in Los Angeles, California, the group was created by actor Andy Comeau and his wife Dawn Lewis. The couple are known by their stage names, Vaud Overstreet and Peaches Mahoney, when performing with the band. The original inspiration for the band was Bruce Springsteen's album "We Shall Overcome: The Seeger Sessions".
