= Come Dance with Me =

Come Dance with Me may refer to:

- Come Dance with Me (1950 film), a British film directed by Mario Zampi
- Come Dance with Me! (1959 film), a French-Italian film starring Brigitte Bardot
- Come Dance with Me (TV series), an American dance competition series
- "Come Dance with Me", an episode of the British children's TV series Rainbow

== Music ==
- "Come Dance with Me" (song), a 1959 song by Jimmy Van Heusen and Sammy Cahn, and recorded by Frank Sinatra
- Come Dance with Me! (album), a 1959 album by Frank Sinatra
- "Come Dance with Me" (Norwegian song), Norway's 2007 entry in Eurovision Song Contest
- "Come Dance with Me", a song written by Mat Maurer and Tony Powers, and recorded by Jay and the Americans in 1963

== See also ==
- Dance with Me (disambiguation)
