= Gregor Bailar =

American technology executive

- Born: Gregor Scott Bailar; May 3, 1963 (age 63); La Grange, IL
- Occupation: CIO
- Employer(s): Hewlett Packard, NeXT, Perot Systems, Citibank, NASDAQ Stock Market, Capital One
- Board member of: CEB, Digitas, National Wildlife Federation, Girl Rising

Gregor Bailar (born May 3, 1963) is a US technology executive, professional director, and philanthropist who held executive roles at Citibank, NASDAQ and Capital One. He managed technology and operations for the NASDAQ Stock Market during the dot-com boom and 9/11 terrorist attacks. He led rescue operations during Katrina and the Beltway Sniper for Capital One. He has been cited as one of the most influential CIOs of the internet age and was inducted into the CIO Hall of Fame in 2007.

== Early life ==
Bailar grew up in Miami, Florida, and was an honor student at South Miami High School, president of the Dade County Association of Student Government Presidents and active in debate, drama and the math club. Bailar is a graduate of Dartmouth College with a BA in Electrical Engineering and Computer Science.

== Business and technology roles ==
Bailar worked at HP, NeXT Computer, Perot Systems, Citicorp, NASDAQ and Capital One. At NeXT, Bailar held several roles, including assisting Steve Jobs as his technical systems engineer during the previews and launch of the NeXT Cube. Bailar assisted at the October 12, 1988 launch and conducted launch-related Q&A and demonstrations as seen in the KPIX coverage of the event. He later became technical director of NeXT Europe and Country Head for NeXT UK. He has served on a variety of for-profit and non-profit boards including Digitas, Inc., Endurance Specialty Holdings and The Corporate Executive Board (now a part of Gartner Group), where he was Chairman of the Audit Committee. Bailar also worked with non-profits including on the board of the National Wildlife Federation and as an adviser to GirlRising. While at NASD/NASDAQ, Bailar oversaw the renovation of the NASDAQ market systems during the dot.com boom.

== Accolades ==
Bailar was inducted into the CIO Hall of Fame by CIO Magazine. While at Capital One, Bailar scored first place in the Information Week 500 ranking of the top users of technology. His workplace automation concepts have been studied and adopted widely in the industry. Forbes Magazine notes that Bailar was "One of the first board-level CIOs." Bailar was an early adotper of agile development in both business and government. In 2012, he assisted the GAO with their report on effective software development practices - including agile development. Bailar was profiled as the "Indiana Jones of IT" by Computer World and has been cited for sourcing approaches.

== Disaster response and risk management ==
While CIO and head of Operations for the NASDAQ Stock Market in 2001, Bailar assisted with the recovery of the US financial markets after the 9/11 terrorist attacks. Bailar's response to the events of 9/11 was historic beyond the impact of the events themselves. The story of his actions was also the first time a story about a CIO's rapid response to events had been published on the Internet before it was reported in print. In 2000, at NASDAQ, Bailar was a key force in the financial markets' remediation of the "Y2K bug." In 2002, Bailar oversaw Capital One's technology team's response to Anthrax scares in DC. Bailar was CIO and a member of the executive committee for Capital One during Katrina and was named to the honor roll of first respondents aiding in recovery from the hurricane. Peter High comments in his book World Class IT that Bailar was involved in "some of the most famous American disasters of the 2000s.

== Publications ==
- Co-inventor, US patent 20050234769: System and method for providing personalized assistance using a financial card having an RFID device.

== Personal life ==
He is married to Terry Bailar and is the father of swimmer, Schuyler Bailar.
