= Dance with Me (Air Supply song) =

2010 single by Air Supply

Single by Air Supply

from the album Mumbo Jumbo
- Released: 2010
- Recorded: 2009
- Genre: Soft rock
- Length: 4:33
- Label: Odds On Records
- Songwriters: Graham Russell, Frankie Moreno
- Producer: Graham Russell

Air Supply singles chronology
"Shadow of the Sun" (2003)	"Dance with Me" (2010)	"Faith in Love" (2010)

"Dance with Me" is a song by English/Australian soft rock duo Air Supply from their seventeenth studio album Mumbo Jumbo, released as the album's first single in 2010. The song was a top 30 hit on the U.S. Billboard Adult Contemporary chart in May 2010, peaking at No. 28 and staying on the chart for 3 weeks. It was their first appearance in the Top 30 on that chart since 1986's "Lonely Is the Night" peaked at number 12 and first entry on the chart since 1995's "Someone" from the album News from Nowhere.

== Charts ==
Chart (2010)	Peak position
US Billboard Adult Contemporary	28

== Personnel ==
- Russell Hitchcock – lead vocals
- Graham Russell – vocals, guitar
- Frankie Moreno – piano
- Russell Letizia – guitar
- Jonni Lightfoot – bass
- Mike Zerbe – drums
