= Louisa Krause =

American actress (born 1986)

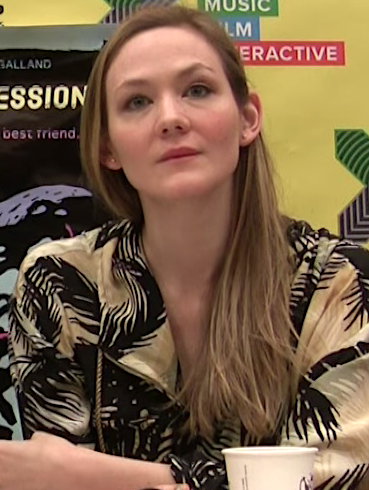
- Krause at South by Southwest, 2015
- Born: Louisa Noel Krause; May 20, 1986 (age 40)
- Education: Carnegie Mellon University
- Occupation: Actress
- Years active: 2007–present

Louisa Noel Krause (born May 20, 1986) is an American actress. After studying drama in college, she appeared in numerous off-Broadway productions while also appearing in episodes of New York-based network television series. Her first film role was in The Babysitters (2007). In 2017, she appeared in the lead role of Anna Garner in the television series The Girlfriend Experience.

== Early life ==
Krause was born May 20, 1986.. Her father is of half-Japanese descent (from Okinawa, Japan) and her mother is American. She has a younger brother, Nathaniel, who is a director. At a young age, she studied dance at the Washington School of Ballet in Washington D.C. Once she entered high school, dance took a backseat when she started performing in a variety of plays and musicals, including Side Show as Violet Hilton, Gypsy as Mama Rose, and Equus as Dora Strang. After graduating from George C. Marshall High School, she enrolled in the Carnegie Mellon Drama School. Soon after, she felt she was ready to start her professional acting career, and earned her Equity card by performing in a summer-stock production of Aida.

== Career ==
Krause began her career in theatre, appearing in numerous off-Broadway productions. In 2006, she appeared in the Huntington Theatre Company's production of Les Liaisons Dangereuses. In 2007, she starred in the Signature Theatre Company's production of Iphigenia 2.o, in the lead role of Iphigenia. That same year, she starred in the world premiere of In a Dark Dark House, at the Lucille Lortel Theatre, June 7 – July 7, 2007. She has continued working on stage, appearing in 2013 as Rose in the world premiere of Annie Baker's The Flick at Playwrights Horizons, a role she reprised two years later at the Barrow Street Theatre and later the National Theatre.

Her first film credits came in 2007, with supporting roles in The Speed of Life and The Babysitters. In 2009, she appeared in Taking Woodstock and Toe to Toe. She is known for her work in independent cinema and has appeared in several short films. Krause gained more prominence with a role in the 2011 feature film Young Adult; her comedic scene as the ennuied clerk at the hotel where Charlize Theron's character stays was included in the trailer and TV spots for the film. She also appeared as a cult member in the 2011 film Martha Marcy May Marlene, with which she became involved through her work with the Sundance Film Festival.

In 2012, Krause had a role in the film Return, and the lead role in the independent film King Kelly, which opened at South by Southwest. In 2012 she filmed a supporting role in the indie film Bluebird, released in 2015. She also has a supporting role in the 2014 independent film The Mend, which premiered at South by Southwest.

Krause has appeared in several television roles, including in the Law & Order episode "Angelgrove" in 2008 as Brenda Tannerman, in Law & Order: Criminal Intent in the episode "Loyalty: Part 1" in 2010 as Jolie, and in Blue Bloods in the 2011 episode "Silver Star" as Kimberly. In 2017, she played Anna Carr/Garner, one of the lead roles in the second season of the anthology television series The Girlfriend Experience.

== Filmography ==
=== Film ===
| Year | Title | Role | Notes |
|---|---|---|---|
| 2007 | The Speed of Life | Jule | |
| 2007 | The Babysitters | Brenda Woodberg | |
| 2008 | Communion | Dolly | Short film |
| 2009 | Toe to Toe | Jesse | |
| 2009 | Taking Woodstock | Hippie Girl | |
| 2011 | Return | Shannon | |
| 2011 | Martha Marcy May Marlene | Zoe | |
| 2011 | Young Adult | Front Desk Girl | |
| 2011 | The Disarticulation of Sarah Danner | Sarah Danner | Short film |
| 2011 | Number Nine | | Short film |
| 2011 | Dog Hair | | Short film |
| 2012 | King Kelly | Kelly | |
| 2012 | Double or Nothing | Becca | Short film |
| 2013 | Bluebird | Marla | |
| 2014 | Tzniut | Rivka | Short film |
| 2014 | The Heart Machine | Jessica | |
| 2014 | The Mend | Elinor | |
| 2014 | Gabriel | Sarah | |
| 2015 | Bare | Lucille Jacobs | |
| 2015 | Ava's Possessions | Ava | |
| 2015 | The Abandoned | Julia Streak | |
| 2015 | Jane Wants a Boyfriend | Jane | |
| 2016 | Donald Cried | Kristin | |
| 2016 | The Great & the Small | Nessa | |
| 2016 | The Phenom | Candace Cassidy | |
| 2016 | Dog Eat Dog | Zoe | |
| 2016 | We've Forgotten More Than We Ever Knew | The Woman | |
| 2016 | My Entire High School Sinking into the Sea | Gretchen (voice) | |
| 2017 | Waiting | Jen | Short film |
| 2017 | Woman Walks Ahead | Loretta | |
| 2017 | The Super | Beverly | |
| 2017 | New Money | Debbie Tisdale | |
| 2018 | Skin | April | |
| 2019 | Port Authority | Sara | |
| 2019 | Dark Waters | Carla Pfeiffer | |
| 2021 | Cryptozoo | Amber (voice) | |
| 2021 | Here Today | Carrie | |
| 2021 | American Insurrection | Volunteer Hunting Party | aka: The Volunteers |
| 2022 | Silk | Emily | Short film |
| 2023 | Tender | Kelsey | Short film |
| 2023 | Maggie Moore(s) | Maggie Moore | |
| 2023 | The Dive | May | |
| 2025 | Outerlands | Kalli | |
| 2025 | Ant Farm | Margaret Holloway | Short film |
| 2025 | Superman | Sapphire Stagg | |
| 2026 | You Can't Win | Irish Annie | Post-production |

=== Television ===
| Year | Title | Role | Notes |
|---|---|---|---|
| 2008 | Law & Order | Brenda Tannerman | Episode: "Angelgrove" |
| 2010 | Law & Order: Criminal Intent | Jolie | Episode: "Loyalty: Part 1" |
| 2011 | Blue Bloods | Kimberly | Episode: "Silver Star" |
| 2013 | Futurestates | Zana | Episode: "Hollow" |
| 2014 | Ten X Ten | Woman 20s | Episode: "Woman 20s" |
| 2016–2018 | Billions | Lu | Recurring role (7 episodes) |
| 2017 | The Girlfriend Experience | Anna Greenwald / Garner | Main cast (season 2) |
| 2018 | Detroiters | | Episode: "April in the D" |
| 2018 | Random Acts of Flyness | Jen | Episode: "Tried to tell my therapist about my dreams / MARTIN HAD A DREEEEAAAAM" |
| 2019 | Ray Donovan | Liberty | Recurring role (season 7; 4 episodes) |
| 2022 | The Equalizer | Rae | Episode: "Somewhere Over the Hudson" |
| 2023 | Barry | "Sally Reed" actor | Episode: "wow" |
| 2026 | The Body | Catherine Anderson | Main role |
