= Chella Man =

American actor, artist, model

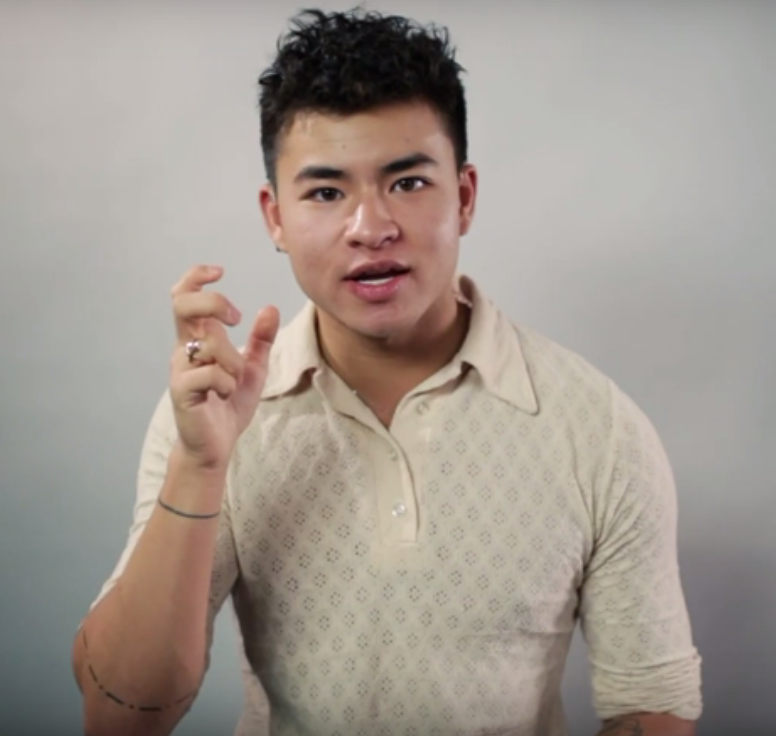
- Chella Man in 2019
- Born: November 26, 1998 (age 27); Mechanicsburg, Pennsylvania, United States
- Occupations: YouTuber; actor; artist; activist
- Years active: 2017–present
- Website: www.chellaman.com

Chella Man (born November 26, 1998) is an American actor, model, artist, YouTuber, and LGBTQ activist. They (Note: Man's social media accounts provide conflicting preferred pronouns. This article uses they/them in the absence of a clear preference.) are known for sharing their experiences as a transgender, Deaf, Asian, and Jewish person of color. Man rose to wider prominence in 2019 for portraying Jericho in the second season of the DC Universe series Titans.

== Early life and education ==
Chella Man was born November 26, 1998, and is of Chinese and Jewish descent, to parents Elena and Dave. Their paternal family was Chinese, from Hong Kong. They were raised in Mechanicsburg, Pennsylvania, a conservative Central Pennsylvania community, where they "did not consider [themself] beautiful". Man was assigned female at birth and experienced gender dysphoria during childhood.

Man began to lose their hearing at four years old. By age 13, they were profoundly deaf, and the next year they received their first cochlear implant. At 16, they had a second implant placed in their other ear.

In 2017, after experiencing gender dysphoria throughout their childhood, Man began transitioning using testosterone. Their use of masculinizing hormone therapy, along with top surgery, helped with their identity, self-esteem, and body image.

In 2019, Man was a student at The New School in Manhattan, where they studied virtual reality programming.

== Career ==
In March 2017, they created their YouTube channel where they posted videos about their personal experiences with gender dysphoria, their identity, their love life, and American Sign Language translation videos to popular songs. Man stated in an interview with Teen Vogue, "There is an extreme lack of representation for young, Deaf, queer, Jewish, Asian, transgender artists...So, I decided to be my own representation." Man also posts videos that attempt to mobilize young voters and discuss the political effects of the Trump administration, whom they did not support. Man began doing so after president Donald Trump visited their high school during his presidential campaign.

In May 2018, Man presented their TedX Talk entitled Becoming Him (using he/him pronouns at the time) in which they talk about their transition journey and gender issues for LGBTQ youth and people with disabilities.

Man signed to IMG as their first Deaf Jewish-Asian model in September 2018. They have modeled for magazines including The Advocate, Bad Hombre, Time Out, Dazed, Gay Times and Mission, and for brands including Calvin Klein, Gap, and American Eagle.

In March 2019, it was announced that Man would make their acting debut as Jericho, a mute crime fighter, for the DC Universe's digital series Titans in its second season. Man stated that they connected to the character, who uses sign language to communicate. They discuss the importance of disabled actors playing disabled characters to support proper representation, stating, "Casting disabled actors/actresses for disabled roles will aid to authentically represent and deconstruct stereotypes built around our identities". Man has discussed and worked alongside fellow disabilities activist Judith Heumann and queer activist Jillian Mercado.

In March 2021, Man appeared on Tamron Hall, discussing their transition that went viral in 2017.

In June 2021, Man became a published author to Penguin Random House; their book, Continuum was the newest addition to the Pocket Change Collective, a series focused on creating a space to discuss gender, sexuality, activism and intersectionality within the literary world.

In October 2021, Man became one of the first out transmasculine non-binary and genderqueer faces to work with a major beauty brand, as a member of the team of young influencers that Yves Saint Laurent assembled to promote their Nu Collection, aimed at a Gen Z audience.

=== Art ===
Man paints, designs tattoos, and has interest in fashion design. Man described how they find inspiration as "pulled from anything I stumble upon that I find aesthetically pleasing. This could be a Picasso in the MoMA or a polka-dotted hat on the NY subway."

Featured on their YouTube channel, Man's art publication is a 3-minute long visual performance, The Beauty of Being Deaf, promoting a jewelry collection that transforms hearing aids into ear jewelry. Man stated they created this jewelry collection as a way to introduce Deaf people into the fashion industry, as well as removing the stigma for wearing hearing aids and cochlear implants. They state, "Yet the appearance of hearing aids and cochlear implants have always created a disconnect. The pieces never felt like me, and I had no control over their designs. I always found myself brainstorming ways to reclaim the machinery that had become a part of me."

In March 2023, they released a short film The Device That Turned Me Into A Cyborg Was Born The Same Year I Was, which "explores [their] complex relationship with the cochlear implant, and navigating identity between the deaf and hearing worlds".

=== Sports ===
In March 2026, Man teamed up with two other trans athletes, runner Cal Calamia and swimmer Schuyler Bailar, to compete in the relay at the Ironman 70.3 in Oceanside, California. The team placed third out of 200 relay teams.

== Personal life ==
Man communicates in English and American Sign Language and most closely identifies with the bicultural identity for deaf people.

Man identifies as queer and pansexual, having come out at age 16. They were previously in a relationship with MaryV Benoit, an artist and photographer.

Man is non-binary and genderqueer. Man went by he/him pronouns since coming out as transgender but changed their Instagram bio to read they/them in late 2023. In 2019, they specifically stated that they do not identify as a trans man, despite still going by he/him at the time.

== Honors and awards ==
- Out100, GLAAD (2018)
- Dazed 100, number 10, Dazed (2019)
- Pride50, Queerty (2019)
- Pride 25, Pride.com (2019)
- LGBTQ+ account, Shorty Awards (2019)
- Judge, Shorty Awards (2020)
- Hero Award, Attitude (2021)

== Filmography ==
Year	Title	Role	Notes
2019	Titans	Jericho	4 episodes
2021	Trans in Trumpland	Producer	
2021	The Beauty of Being Deaf	Director, producer, editor	

== See also ==
- Chinese people in New York City
- LGBT culture in New York City
- List of LGBT people from New York City
