= Ven Conmigo =

Ven Conmigo (English: Come With Me) may refer to:

- Ven Conmigo (album), a 1990 album released by Tex-Mex singer Selena.
- "Ven Conmigo" (song), a 2011 song released by Puerto Rican singer Daddy Yankee.
- Ven conmigo (telenovela), a 1975 Mexican telenovela
- "Ven Conmigo (Solamente Tú)", the Spanish version of "Come On Over Baby (All I Want Is You)" by American singer Christina Aguilera.
