= Bailando =

Bailando may refer to:

- "Bailando" (Paradisio song), 1996
- "Bailando" (Enrique Iglesias song), 2014
- "Bailando" (Rouge song), 2018
- Bailando!, special promotional CD release by pop singer Gloria Estefan
- "Bailando", a song by Alaska y los Pegamoides
- "Bailando", a song by Frankie Ruiz
- "Bailando", a song by Lynda Thomas from the album Un grito en el corazón
- "Bailando", a song by Yaga & Mackie from La Moda

== See also ==
- Bailando por un Sueño, a franchised TV series
- "Bailando Por El Mundo", single by Spanish producer, singer, remixer and DJ of electronic music Juan Magan, featuring Pitbull and El Cata
- "Siga Bailando", a song by Bonny Cepeda
