= Los Caños (band) =

Los Caños was a successful Spanish boyband of the 2000s comprising Kiko (Juan Manuel Gaviño Román, born 1985), Juande (Juan de Dios Carrera Tracista, born 1984) and Javi (Alberto Javier Couceiro Gómez, born 1985).

== Discography ==
Los Caños (2000, CD)

1. A veces
2. El virus del amor
3. Nunca llueve al sur de California
4. Contigo
5. Niña piensa en ti
6. Eres para mí
7. Melina
8. Baila morena
9. Una vida por delante
10. Te extraño

Agua de luna (2002, CD)

1. Agua de Luna
2. A lo mejor me querías
3. Sin decirnos nada
4. Si tú bailas para mí
5. Sentir como yo siento
6. Nena, dime por qué
7. Qué puedo hacer
8. Huellas en mi corazón
9. A mi lado mi vida
10. Adriana
11. Lo que es echarte de menos
12. Ella es
13. Cartitas de amor

Los Locos Somos Asi (2003)

1. Los Locos Somos Así letra
2. Tú No Sabes letra
3. Hoy La Vi letra
4. Bailar En Tu Boca letra
5. Quiero Ser letra
6. Dónde Voy Sin Tí letra
7. Lluvia Pasajera letra
8. Aquel Amor letra
9. Hay Problemas letra
10. Te Pido La Noche letra
11. No Me Pidas Que Te Sueñe letra
12. Créeme letra
13. Y Tú No Ves letra

Lo Mejor De Los Caños (2005)

1. Dime Algo Bonito letra
2. Niña Piensa En Ti letra
3. A Veces letra
4. De Que Manera letra
5. Una Vida Por Delante letra
6. Hoy La Vi letra
7. Agua De Luna letra
8. Enséñame letra
9. Sin Decirnos Nada letra
10. Tú No Sabes letra
11. Cartitas De Amor letra
12. Bailar En Tu Boca letra
13. Un Alma Para Dos letra
14. Créeme letra
15. Hay Problemas letra
16. Sin Pensar letra
17. Bailar En Tu Boca (Con José Flores) letra
18. Niña Piensa En Ti (Bulgaria Remix) letra
19. Niña Piensa En Ti (Con Susana) letra
