= Jason B. Kohl =

American film director

- Born: Jason Burton Kohl; Lansing, Michigan, U.S.
- Education: UCLA School of Theater, Film and Television
- Occupations: Director, screenwriter, producer
- Years active: 2013–present
- Website: jasonbkohl.com

Jason Burton Kohl is an Austrian/American filmmaker from Michigan. His films have screened at festivals including the Berlinale, SXSW, Locarno, NYFF, BFI London, Tallinn Black Nights and Traverse City.

== Early life ==
Kohl grew up in Michigan. His father is from Vienna and his mother is from Pittsburgh, they both worked in agriculture. He studied English literature at Kalamazoo College, where he discovered filmmaking. After moving to Germany on a Fulbright Scholarship, Kohl began working in the German film industry before he was accepted into the UCLA School of Theater, Film and Television, where he received his MFA in directing.

== Short films ==
Kohl's first short film, A Son Like You, starring Disney channel actor Jake Short, followed a young boy who accidentally meets his father's mistress. The film premiered at the 2012 Florida Film Festival.

The following year Kohl's UCLA MFA Thesis Film The Slaughter premiered at the 2013 SXSW Film Festival, and went on to screen at the Locarno Festival, BFI London Film Festival, and become a finalist for the Student Academy Awards. The film, which stars Michael Shamus Wiles and Eli Bridges, follows a pig farmer who tests his unemployed son's resolve to join the family business.

The film, shot on Kohl's family pig farm in Lansing, Michigan, sparked a heated discussion for its portrayal of a humane slaughter of a pig. Kohl was inspired to make the film from his experience working on the farm, which gave him concern over industrial agriculture. He wrote for No Film School that:

Food animals are now almost entirely raised on factory farms, which has had profound consequences for animal rights, human health and the environment.

The film received praise from various critics. Scott Macaulay, writing for Filmmaker Magazine, called it "a masterfully directed story." Katie Walsh, writing for The Playlist, said that the film was "able to pack more of an emotional punch in just 15 minutes than many studio feature films." Jason Sondhi, writing for Short of the Week, said that "The film is excellently written. Subtle, and filled with details and plot points which are called back, it is a great showcase of Kohl's emerging talent." Alex Garland wrote in the academic food journal Gastronomica that

While certainly a product of the spirit of the times, ardently willing new meanings onto food, the film remains a profound viewing experience that is nothing short of immersive in its depiction of the cessation of life intrinsic to eating.

In 2014, Kohl's documentary short 80 to 90 ft premiered at the Los Angeles Film Festival. Set in Traverse City, Michigan, the film follows a pair of Native American fishermen whose business is threatened by climate change. It was later acquired by The Atlantic Magazine for distribution.

His next documentary short, Lucid Dream, part of the Soundhunters multimedia project, screened at the 2015 SXSW Film Festival, the New York Film Festival and won the FIPA D'or at the Festival International de Programmes Audiovisuels. The film follows the electronic musician Daedelus as he creates a new piece of music from sounds he discovers in Berlin. The film was aired on Arte France in 2015.

== Feature films ==
In 2017, Kohl's first feature film, New Money, premiered at the 2017 Tallinn Black Nights Film Festival. The film stars Louisa Krause and Emmy and Gotham Nominee Robin Weigert, and follows a young woman who kidnaps her estranged father after he cuts her out of his will. The film was shot on location in Lansing, Michigan and Detroit, Michigan.

The film was released on April 16, 2019 in the US by Gravitas Ventures, followed by a theatrical release in Germany and Austria. New Money received positive reviews from critics, with particular praise for actress Louisa Krause's performance. Chuck Foster, in a 9/10 review for Film Threat, called New Money...

A smart, engaging thriller. Kohl has delivered a Coen brothers-type narrative with airtight precision. Louisa Krause clearly shines.

Douglas Davidson, writing for Elements of Madness, praised the film as

A powder keg of emotion, beautifully shot, scored and performed.

== Feature documentaries ==
Kohl has also completed two feature documentaries. The first, Eli, A Dog in Prison, is set in a prison outside Detroit. It follows three prisoners who raise a puppy to become a guide dog for the blind. The film was released as a Topic Original in August 2021. It had its world premiere at the 2022 Traverse City Film Festival. Common Sense Media wrote that it was

"a beautiful, moving film about the humanity that can be brought out in all of us through our connection with animals."

The second, The Process of Recovering, follows an incest survivor and her remarkable recovery process. The film was produced by Vice Media and Gebrueder Beetz, and aired on the German television network NDR as Nicht Meine Schande: Geschichte Eines Missbrauchs in August 2020. The film had its US premiere at the Sarasota Film Festival. It was also nominated for the Juliane Bartel Media Prize for the promotion of equality between the genders. The film received praise from critics, including Der Spiegel, which wrote that it was

"courageous… definitely worth seeing."

In 2021 Kohl wrote, edited and executive produced Trans in Trumpland, a four part documentary series for Topic, which was nominated for the GLAAD Media Award. The series received praise from critics, including Vanity Fair, which called it:

"a vital contribution to the trans media canon."

== Filmography ==
- A Son Like You (2012)
- The Slaughter (2013)
- 80 TO 90 FT (2014)
- 3 Acres in Detroit (2014)
- Lucid Dream (2015)
- New Money (2017)
- The Process of Recovering (2021)
- Eli, A Dog In Prison (2021)
- Trans in Trumpland (2021)
