= Schuyler Bailar =

American swimmer and LGBTQ rights advocate

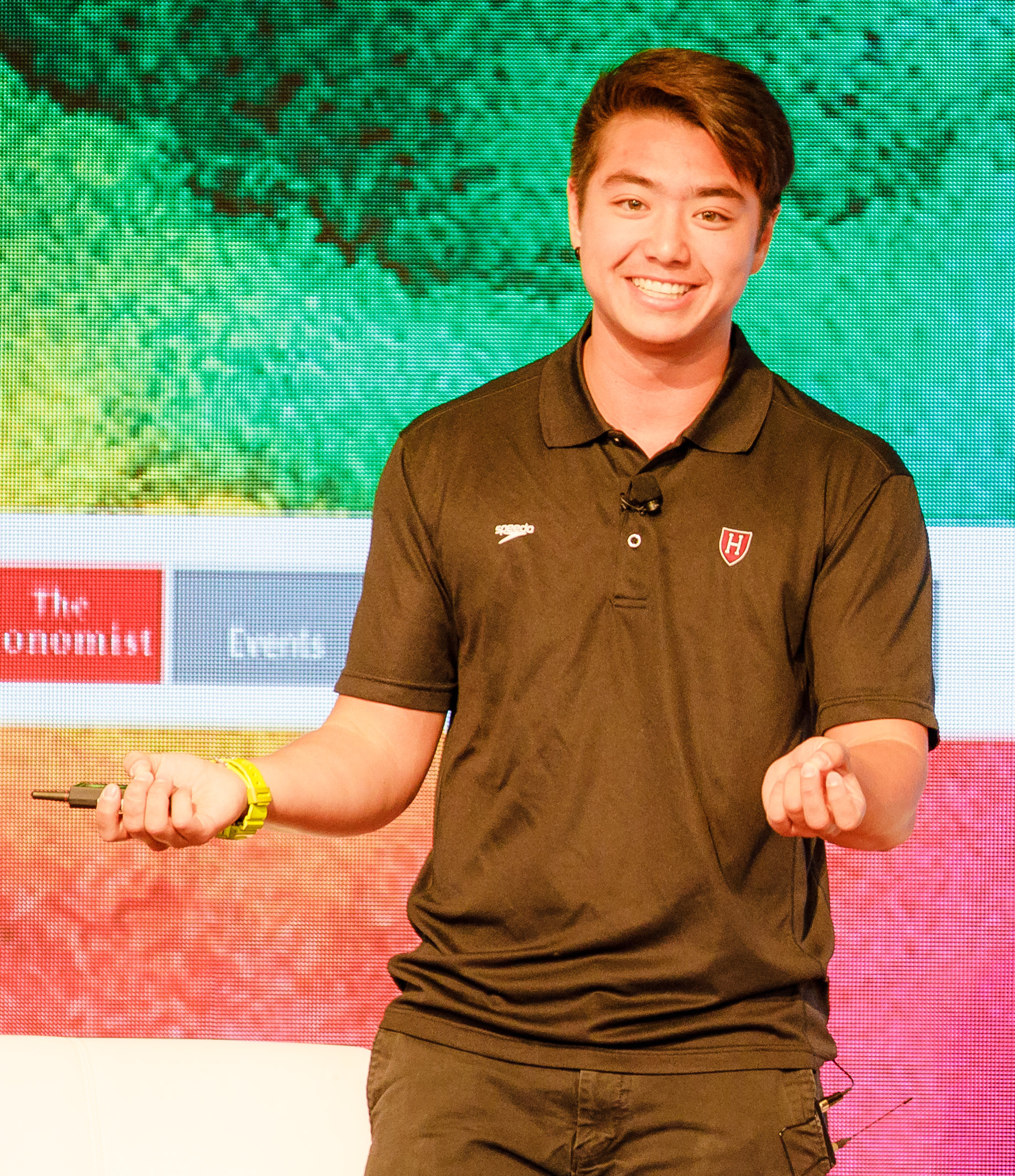
- Bailar in 2017

Personal information
- Full name: Schuyler Miwon Hong Bailar
- Born: 1996 (age 29–30) New York City, New York, US
- Spouse: Sarah Ehsani (m. 2022)

Sport
- Sport: Swimming
- Strokes: Breaststroke, individual medley, butterfly
- Club: Nation's Capital Swim Club, Sea Devil Swimming
- College team: Harvard University

Schuyler Miwon Hong Bailar (born 1996) is an American swimmer, author, educator, and advocate for LGBTQ rights. He is the first openly transgender NCAA Division I swimmer, and also the first publicly documented NCAA D1 transgender man to compete as a man in any sport.

Bailar was recruited by Harvard University and swam on the Harvard Men's Swimming and Diving team under coach Kevin Tyrrell; he was a member of the Harvard Class of 2019. He was originally recruited in 2013 as a member of the women's team by Harvard Women's Swimming and Diving head coach Stephanie Morawski. After transitioning during a gap year, Bailar was also offered a spot on the men's team by coach Tyrrell, allowing Bailar the choice of either team. He elected to swim on the men's team.

== Early life ==
Bailar was assigned female at birth in New York City to parents Gregor Bailar and Terry Hong. His mother is of Korean descent. Bailar grew up in McLean, Virginia, where he lived until attending college. He attended Georgetown Day School from kindergarten through 12th grade.

== Swimming ==
Bailar started swimming when he was about one year old. When he was four, his family joined a neighborhood summer club and he began swimming for the Langley Wildthings at the Langley Swim and Tennis Club. The Wildthings are a part of the Northern Virginia Swimming League, for which Bailar would eventually podium in their overall All-Star championships. Bailar swam for the Wildthings nearly every summer as his love for swimming grew.

In 2005, at the age of nine, Bailar joined Sea Devil Swimming (previously known as the Capitol Sea Devils), a year-round USA Swimming sanctioned club team. Under coach Ron Larkin, his true love of competitive swimming began. Bailar competed in the Potomac Valley LSC of USA Swimming and quickly rose through the ladder of swimming championships. At age 10, he competed at the 2007 Potomac Valley Junior Olympics. He continued up the ladder to the 2008, 2009, 2010, 2011 JOs and the 2010, 2011, 2012 Eastern Zones.

Bailar set school records competing against girls in nearly every event at Georgetown Day School. Bailar's broader high school titles include 1st place in both 2013 and 2014 in 100yd breaststroke at the Independent School League Championships (ISLs), Metropolitan Preparatory School Swimming and Diving League (WMPSSDLs) as well as the Metropolitan Interscholastic Swimming and Diving Championships (Metros). Bailar was a 2-time All American (NICSA) for 100yd breast, A Potomac Valley Scholar Athlete and a USA Swimming Scholastic All American. At the national level of competitive swimming, Bailar won many honors in both high school and club swimming women's events including setting a USA Swimming National Age Group record in the 400yd Medley Relay at the 2013 USA Swimming AT&T National Championships with teammates Katie Ledecky, Janet Hu, and Kylie Jordan. Bailar swam for the celebrated Nation's Capital Swim Club (NCAP) at that meet; and the team won the 2013 USA Swimming AT&T National Championship title. Bailar's 100 yard breaststroke swim at the 2013 NCSA Junior National Championships qualified for the U.S. Open, the fastest national championship meet. Bailar is also multi-year qualifier for the NCSA Jr. Nationals.

In 2019, Bailar completed his college career posting the "third fastest" time for 100-yard breaststroke for the Harvard team in the 2018–2019 season, and winning his third Ivy-League Championship ring as part of the Crimson's highest ranked team since the 1960–1961 season, which placed 8th at the 2019 NCAA Championships. Although Bailar began his college swimming career with low expectations, his final 100-yard breaststroke time ranked him in the top 15% of all NCAA men's swims for the season and in the top 34% of all NCAA Division 1 swims for the season.

In March 2026, Bailar teamed up with two other trans athletes, runner Cal Calamia and cyclist Chella Man, to compete in the relay at the Ironman 70.3 in Oceanside, California. The team placed third out of 200 relay teams.

== Activism and acclaim ==
Bailar is an advocate for LGBTQ rights and inclusion. He has assisted with and is featured in the USA Swimming cultural inclusion guides for both LGBTQ and Asian American athletes. He also attended the NCAA Common Ground initiative, a group of selected athletes, coaches and sports constituents who met to discuss inclusion in NCAA activities. Bailar's primary activism is on the speaking circuit, appearing at schools, corporations and non-profits. After graduating from Harvard in 2019, he began working full time as a public speaker.

Bailar was awarded the SMYAL Community Advocate Award for 2016 for his work as "a vocal advocate for LGBT rights." The 60 Minutes profile of Bailar entitled "Switching Teams" was nominated for the 28th GLAAD Media Awards. On June 28, 2017, Bailar was profiled by the International Olympic Committee in a series entitled IDENTIFY for his activism in promoting gender inclusion in sports. Bailar was featured as a member of the 2017 Out magazine OUT 100 and in another first, was the only LGBTQ athlete included in the elite listing for 2017.

In 2018, Bailar received several accolades: He was named to The Advocate's Champions of Pride list of Top LGBTQ activists in each state. He was named to the Gold House A100 list of the most influential Asian Americans. In 2019, Bailar was awarded the NBIC Best-of-the Best Visibility Award, hosted by the NGLCC for his "courageous and life-changing" example as an out and vocal trans athlete. As a notable graduate of the class of 2019, he received the Harvard Athletics Director's Award for the athlete who makes an outstanding contribution to athletics through education.

As of 2023, Bailar's work includes regularly hosting workshops and programs that promote diversity and inclusion, including DEI trainings, motivational speeches, seminars, consultations, and his educational series LaneChanger, which are offered to corporate and community groups. On April 24, 2023, Bailar began hosting a podcast called Dear Schuyler, where he and his guests discuss "how gender, mental health and civil rights affect all of us daily". His guests have included Lia Thomas and Dylan Mulvaney.

In October 2023, Bailar published a book, He/She/They: How We Talk About Gender and Why It Matters.

== Personal life ==
Bailar married Sarah Ehsani on September 6, 2022, and announced the marriage on his Instagram.

=== Health and transition ===
Bailar began struggling with mental health problems in the fall of 2012, his junior year in high school. He went to therapy and later enrolled at Oliver-Pyatt Centers, a residential treatment center for eating disorders, where he was first able to discuss and explore his gender identity. Bailar attended gender workshops at the YES! Institute in Miami, Florida, which he says helped him realize and come to terms with his gender.

Shortly after his discharge from the center in October 2014, he began transitioning. He underwent top surgery (bilateral double mastectomy) in March 2015 and began hormone replacement therapy in June. He reported on his progress via social media, and MTV selected the Washington Post coverage of Bailar for 2015's Best Moments for the Trans Community.

== See also ==
- Diversity in swimming
