= Barbara Bailar =

American statistician (1935–2023)

Barbara Ann Bailar (1935 – 13 June 2023) was an American statistician, who worked for many years at the United States Census Bureau but resigned in protest over the decision not to adjust its 1990 results. She was the only person to have been both president and executive director of the American Statistical Association.

== Census work ==
Bailar worked for nearly thirty years at the United States Census Bureau, beginning in 1958. During this time she completed a Ph.D. in 1972 from American University and met her husband John Christian Bailar there. The couple would have 4 children.

At the bureau, she helped begin the use of computer-aided interviewing, and founded an annual research conference. She served as chief of research at the Census Bureau from 1974 to 1979, when she became associate director for Statistical Standards and Methodology. She was president of the American Statistical Association in 1987.

== Resignation and later career ==
Bailar retired from the census in 1988, in part as a protest against a politically motivated decision to avoid adjusting the 1990 census results to counteract systematic undercounts of underrepresented groups. She had been one of the chief witnesses in an earlier lawsuit on the same issue for the 1980 census, testifying at that time that the difficulty of matching the sampled data needed for the adjustment with the full data from the census meant that the adjustment would not likely improve the accuracy of the result. However, when the decision was made to continue avoiding any adjustment in the 1990 census, Bailar took the other side. She was quoted at the time in The Washington Post as stating that the decision to avoid adjustment "was dressed up like a technical decision when everyone knew it was a political decision. That kind of hypocrisy I just can't live with".

After retiring from the census, Bailar became executive director of the American Statistical Association, and then Senior Vice President for Survey Research at the National Opinion Research Center at the University of Chicago. She retired again in 2001.

== Awards and honors ==
Bailar became a fellow of the American Statistical Association in 1975.

In 1980, the United States Department of Commerce awarded her their Silver Medal for meritorious service.

In 1997 Bailar was recipient of the American Statistical Association's Founders Award. She was also an elected member of the International Statistical Institute.
