= John C. Bailar Jr. =

American chemist

John Christian Bailar Jr.
- Born: May 27, 1904; Golden, Colorado
- Died: October 17, 1991 (aged 87); Urbana, Illinois
- Education: University of Michigan
- Children: John C. Bailar III
- Awards: Priestley Medal (1964)
- Scientific career
- Fields: Inorganic chemistry
- Doctoral students: Fred Basolo
- Other notable students: Basudeb DasSarma

John Christian Bailar Jr. (May 27, 1904 – October 17, 1991) was a professor of inorganic chemistry at the University of Illinois at Urbana-Champaign. He received his B.A. at the University of Colorado and his Ph.D. at the University of Michigan. His father was a member of the chemistry staff of the Colorado School of Mines.

At the University of Illinois, he developed an active research program on coordination chemistry. He is referred to as the “Father of Coordination Chemistry in the United States,” as prior to his time, this area of chemistry received little attention in the U.S. The Bailar twist in coordination compounds is named after him. He helped found the book series Inorganic Syntheses and the journal Inorganic Chemistry. His work was widely recognized culminating in the award of the Priestley Medal from the American Chemical Society, an organization of which he was also president.

== Personal life ==
He and his wife, Florence (Catherwood) Bailar, had two sons, one of whom was John Christian Bailar III.
