= The Court Jesters (band) =

American musical band

The Court Jesters were a 1960s American doo-wop group, best known for their humorous 1961 single "Roaches". The lyrics implore the listener to not "leave your food on the table" to prevent the titular roaches. The B side of "Roaches" was a ballad called "The Trial (Of My Love)".

== Discography ==
- "It's All Right" / B: "Dance For Me" Roulette Records R-4746, July 1967
- "Roaches" / B: "The Trial (Of My Love)" Blast Records BL-201, 1961
- King Louie with the Court Jesters - "I've Been Down So Long" / B: "Broadway Up Tight" Mockingbird Records MR-1007 Unknown
