= Trace Lysette =

American actress (born 1981)

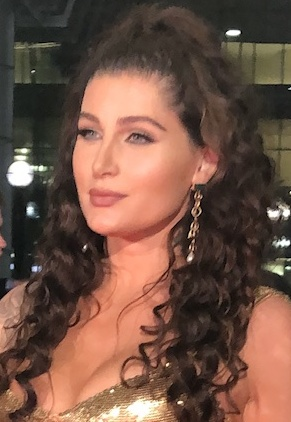
- Lysette at Hustlers premiere at the Toronto Film Festival 2019
- Born: 1987 (age 38–39); Lexington, Kentucky, U.S.
- Occupation: Actress
- Years active: 2013–present

Trace Lysette (born 1987) is an American actress whose most notable roles include Shea in the television series Transparent (2014–2019) and Tracey in the feature film Hustlers (2019). As a trans actress, she also featured in the Netflix documentary Disclosure as herself.

== Early life ==
Lysette was born in Lexington, Kentucky, and grew up in and around Dayton, Ohio.

In her late teens, Lysette was a track athlete and performed as a drag queen in bars and clubs in Dayton and Columbus, Ohio. She moved to New York City after high school in search of opportunities. Lysette was estranged from her biological family and struggled financially due to her gender transition, which led her to seek acceptance in the underground New York ball culture scene, of which she has been a member since young adulthood.

Lysette began training as an actor in New York City, studying at various acting studios starting in 2007. Her television debut was a guest appearance as Lila in an episode of Law & Order: Special Victims Unit in 2013, making her one of the first transgender people to appear in a cisgender speaking role on primetime television in the US.

== Career ==
After working in non-transgender roles, Lysette came out publicly as trans through her role as Shea on the Amazon series Transparent, which debuted in 2014. On the show, she plays a transgender yoga teacher and friend of Maura Pfefferman (Jeffrey Tambor). Lysette originally auditioned for the role of Davina. The third season of Transparent contains a storyline in which Shea has a romantic relationship with a cisgender heterosexual man, which has been called "a groundbreaking TV moment for a trans character." Lysette was an unpaid consultant for the 2015 film The Danish Girl.

Lysette made her major feature debut in 2019 starring alongside Jennifer Lopez and Constance Wu among others in the critically acclaimed box office hit Hustlers.

She has also appeared in guest roles in shows such as Blunt Talk, David Makes Man, Midnight, Texas, Pose and Drunk History. She also made an appearance in Caitlyn Jenner's documentary series I Am Cait. Additionally, she has appeared as a muse in several high-profile music videos for artists such as Maroon 5, Cher, Teyana Taylor, The Shins, and Laverne Cox.

In 2017, transgender actors and actresses including Lysette (with the help of GLAAD and ScreenCrush) were part of a filmed letter to Hollywood written by Jen Richards, asking for more and improved roles for transgender people.

In June 2020, in honor of the 50th anniversary of the first LGBTQ Pride parade, Queerty named her among the fifty heroes "leading the nation toward equality, acceptance, and dignity for all people". An article published in July 2020 by Variety revealed that Lysette had signed on as an Executive Producer of Trans in Trumpland, a documentary series about being transgender in the Trump Administration era.

In 2021, Lysette released her first single, "SMB", which she described as a hip hop track. She also featured on Cazwell's single, "Taser in My Telfar Bag," with Chanel Jole. She hosted Harsh Reality: The Story of Miriam Rivera, a podcast re-examining the 2004 dating show, There's Something About Miriam. The first episode of the eight-episode series was released on iTunes on November 29, 2021.

Lysette played the title character in the film Monica, completed in 2022 and released in 2023. She was nominated for a Best Lead Performance Independent Spirit Award for her role.

In a November 2026 interview, Lysette and other trans and non-binary actors noted a sharp decline in on-screen representation since 2024. Lysette described her inability to get regular or lead roles following her earlier success as "a full-on ego death". She had also posted on X that September that she lost her SAG-AFTRA health insurance two years ago, and was looking for work.

== Personal life ==
Lysette has spoken at various events and colleges across the country, including Women's March Las Vegas, and Out & Equal in Philadelphia, about her experiences in hopes of highlighting the injustices that members of the trans community face. In 2017, she recorded an online PSA with Trevor Project dedicated to suicide prevention awareness for LGBTQ youth.

In 2018, Lysette commented on Twitter about actress Scarlett Johansson's decision to accept the role of a transgender man Dante "Tex" Gill in crime drama Rub & Tug, stating that opportunities for trans actors were already so limited. Johansson eventually withdrew from the role.

Although Lysette was estranged from her family for a period of time when she transitioned, her mother later became supportive.

Lysette started her gender transition as a teenager.

In 2017, Lysette claimed that she had experienced sexual harassment from her Transparent co-star Jeffrey Tambor, a week after Tambor's former assistant Van Barnes made similar allegations. Two more women, Rain Valdez and Tamara Delbridge, followed with allegations too. In response, Tambor issued a statement denying the allegations of all the accusers. Showrunner Joey Soloway published a statement expressing "great respect and admiration for Van Barnes and Trace Lysette, whose courage in speaking out about their experience on Transparent is an example of the leadership this moment in our culture requires." In 2018, after an extensive internal investigation by Amazon, the show's producers confirmed that Tambor would not be returning to the show.

== Filmography ==
=== Film ===
Year	Title	Role	Notes
2016	Coffee House Chronicles: The Movie	Rachel	
2017	Deadbeat	Ryan's Wife	Short film
2019	Hustlers	Tracey	
2020	Disclosure: Trans Lives on Screen	Herself	Documentary film
2021	Venus as a Boy	Hendrix	
2022	Monica	Monica	

=== Television ===
Year	Title	Role	Notes
2013	Law & Order: Special Victims Unit	Lila	Episode: "Internal Affairs"
2015	The Curse of the Fuentes Women	Gloria	Television film
2014–2019	Transparent	Shea	12 episodes
2015	I Am Cait	Herself	3 episodes
2015–2016	Blunt Talk	Gisele	4 episodes
2016–2019	Drunk History	Sylvia Rivera / Elizabeth Eden	2 episodes
2017	RuPaul's Drag Race	Herself	Episode: "Grand Finale"
2018–2019	Pose	Tess Wintour	2 episodes
2018	Midnight, Texas	Celeste	Episode: "Drown the Sadness in Chardonnay"
2019	David Makes Man	Femi	Episode: "Dai Out"
2021	Q-Force	Toluca Lake (voice)	2 episodes
2023	Quantum Leap	Kate	Episode: "Let Them Play"

=== Web ===
Year	Title	Role	Notes
2016	Coffee House Chronicles	Rachel	Episode: "Tran-sitions"

== Music videos ==
=== As lead artist ===
Year	Title	Director(s)	Ref.
2021	"SMB"	Trace Lysette; Johnny Sibilly	
2021	"Taser in My Telfar Bag" (with Cazwell and Chanel Jole)	Ariel Hernandez	

=== Guest appearances ===
Year	Title	Artist(s)	Ref.
2017	"Name for You" (Flipped)	The Shins	
2018	"Girls Like You" (Original, Volume 2 and Vertical Video versions)	Maroon 5 featuring Cardi B	
2018	"Beat for the Gods"	Laverne Cox	
2018	"SOS"	Cher	
2019	"WTP"	Teyana Taylor	

== Awards and nominations ==
Award	Year	Category	Work	Result	Ref.
GLAAD Media Award	2022	Outstanding TV Journalism – Long-Form	Trans in Trumpland	Nominated	
Independent Spirit Awards	2023	Best Lead Performance	Monica	Nominated	
Dorian Awards	2024	Film Performance of the Year	Monica	Nominated	
