= John C. Bailar III =

American statistician (1932–2016)

- Born: October 9, 1932; Urbana, Illinois
- Died: September 6, 2016 (aged 83)
- Education: American University (Ph.D.)
- Occupations: Statistician; Professor Emeritus
- Employer: University of Chicago

John Christian Bailar III (October 9, 1932 – September 6, 2016) was an American statistician and Professor Emeritus at the University of Chicago.

== Early life and education ==
He was born in Urbana, Illinois, the son of John C. Bailar, Jr., a chemistry professor, and Florence (Catherwood) Bailar. He graduated from the University of Colorado with a B.A. in chemistry in 1953, from Yale University with an M.D. in 1955, and from American University with a Ph.D. in statistics in 1973.

== Career ==
He was editor-in-chief of the Journal of the National Cancer Institute and has been on the Editorial Board of Cancer Research and statistical consultant to the New England Journal of Medicine. He also was briefly a Professor of Biostatistics at the Harvard School of Public Health in Boston before he moved to Canada. In 1975 he was elected as a Fellow of the American Statistical Association.

== Personal life ==
At American University he met his wife, fellow statistician Barbara A. Bailar. He had four children. Bailar died at age 83 in Mitchellville, Maryland on September 6, 2016.

== Memberships/Awards ==
- Fellow of the American Statistical Association (1975)
- Elected member of the National Academy of Medicine (1993)
- Elected member of the International Statistical Institute
- Fellow of the American College of Epidemiology
- Fellow of the American Association for the Advancement of Science
- Fellow of the Collegium Ramazzini (1996)
- Fellow of the MacArthur Fellows Program (1990-1995)

== Works ==
- Medical uses of statistics, Editors John Christian Bailar, Frederick Mosteller, CRC Press, 1992, ISBN 978-0-910133-36-4
- Assessment of the NIOSH head-and-face anthropometric survey of U.S. respirator users, Editors John Christian Bailar, Emily Ann Meyer, Robert Pool, National Academies Press, 2007, ISBN 978-0-309-10398-5
