= Baila Conmigo =

Baila Conmigo may refer to:

- Baila conmigo (TV series), a 1992 Mexican telenovela and soundtrack album
- Baila Conmigo (Rita Lee album), 1982
- "Baila Conmigo" (Jennifer Lopez song), 2019
- "Baila Conmigo" (Selena Gomez and Rauw Alejandro song), 2021
- "Baila Conmigo", a song by Adelén, 2013
- "Baila Conmigo", a song by Akon from El Negreeto, 2019
- "Baila Conmigo", a song by Ranking Stone from Censurado, 2003
- "Baila Conmigo", a song by Yellow Claw, 2019

== See also ==
- Baila Comigo, a 1981 Brazilian telenovela
- Dance with Me (disambiguation)
