= 37th Lambda Literary Awards =

2025 awards ceremony for LGBTQ+ literature

- Awarded for: Works of LGBTQ+ literature
- Date: October 4, 2025
- Country: United States
- Presented by: Lambda Literary Foundation
- Eligibility: LGBTQ+ storytelling, published in the US in 2024
- Website: www.lambdaliterary.org/awards

The finalists for the 37th Lambda Literary Awards, which honor works of LGBTQ+ literature published in 2024, were announced on July 30, 2025. The virtual awards ceremony announcing the winners took place on October 4, 2025. It was hosted from Charlie's Queer Books in Seattle, Washington.

== Nominees and winners ==
37th Lambda Literary Awards winners and finalists
Category	Author	Title	Publisher	Result	Ref.
Bisexual Fiction	Muriel Leung	How To Fall in Love in a Time of Unnameable Disaster	W. W. Norton & Company	Winner	
Bisexual Fiction	August Thompson	Anyone's Ghost	Penguin Press	Finalist	
Bisexual Fiction	Rebecca K Reilly	Greta & Valdin	Avid Reader Press | Simon & Schuster	Finalist	
Bisexual Fiction	Casey McQuiston	The Pairing: Special 1st Edition	St. Martin's Griffin	Finalist	
Bisexual Fiction	Kimberly King Parsons	We Were the Universe	Alfred A. Knopf	Finalist	
Bisexual Nonfiction	Desiree Akhavan	You're Embarrassing Yourself	Random House	Winner	
Bisexual Nonfiction	Jon Macy	Djuna: The Extraordinary Life of Djuna Barnes	Street Noise Books	Finalist	
Bisexual Nonfiction	Lilly Dancyger	First Love: Essays on Friendship	The Dial Press	Finalist	
Bisexual Nonfiction	Rebecca Orchant	Simmering: A Kitchen Memoir	Unbound Edition Press	Finalist	
Bisexual Nonfiction	Morgan Parker	You Get What You Pay For	One World	Finalist	
Bisexual Poetry	Jeddie Sophronius	Interrogation Records	Gaudy Boy	Winner	
Bisexual Poetry	Brittany Rogers	Good Dress	Tin House	Finalist	
Bisexual Poetry	Dorothy Chan	Return of the Chinese Femme	Deep Vellum	Finalist	
Bisexual Poetry	Nathan Mader	The Endless Animal	fine. press	Finalist	
Bisexual Poetry	Niki Herd	The Stuff of Hollywood	Copper Canyon Press	Finalist	
Gay Fiction	Allen Bratton	Henry Henry	Unnamed Press	Winner	
Gay Fiction	Jiaming Tang	Cinema Love	Dutton	Finalist	
Gay Fiction	Thomas Grattan	In Tongues	MCD	Finalist	
Gay Fiction	Pol Guasch; translated by Mara Faye Lethem	Napalm in the Heart	FSG Originals	Finalist	
Gay Fiction	Alan Hollinghurst	Our Evenings	Random House	Finalist	
Gay Memoir/ Biography	Brad Gooch	RADIANT: The Life and Line of Keith Haring	HarperCollins	Winner	
Gay Memoir/ Biography	Darius Stewart	Be Not Afraid of My Body: A Lyrical Memoir	Belt Publishing	Finalist	
Gay Memoir/ Biography	Komail Aijazuddin	Manboobs: A Memoir of Musicals, Visas, Hope, and Cake	Harry N. Abrams	Finalist	
Gay Memoir/ Biography	Michael Nott	Thom Gunn	Farrar, Straus and Giroux	Finalist	
Gay Memoir/ Biography	Michael G. Lee	When the Band Played On	Chicago Review Press	Finalist	
Gay Poetry	Saúl Hernández	How to Kill a Goat and Other Monsters	University of Wisconsin Press	Winner	
Gay Poetry	Joshua Garcia	Pentimento	Black Lawrence Press	Finalist	
Gay Poetry	Blas Falconer	Rara Avis	Four Way Books	Finalist	
Gay Poetry	Carl Phillips	Scattered Snows, to the North	Farrar, Straus and Giroux	Finalist	
Gay Poetry	Okwudili Nebeolisa	Terminal Maladies	Autumn House Press	Finalist	
Gay Romance	Benjamin S. Grossberg	The Spring Before Obergefell: A Novel	University of Nebraska Press	Winner	
Gay Romance	Jem Wendel	It Takes Three To Tango	Larking About Press	Finalist	
Gay Romance	Logan Sage Adams	Our Own Light	Self-published	Finalist	
Gay Romance	William Leet	Outside the Wire	Flashpoint Publications	Finalist	
Gay Romance	Philip Ellis	We Could Be Heroes	G.P. Putnam's Sons | Penguin Random House	Finalist	
Lesbian Fiction	Yael van der Wouden	The Safekeep	Avid Reader Press | Simon & Schuster	Winner	
Lesbian Fiction	Venita Blackburn	Dead in Long Beach, California	MCD	Finalist	
Lesbian Fiction	Emma Copley Eisenberg	Housemates	Hogarth	Finalist	
Lesbian Fiction	Melissa Mogollon	Oye	Hogarth	Finalist	
Lesbian Fiction	Maggie Thrash	Rainbow Black	HarperCollins	Finalist	
Lesbian Memoir/ Biography	Sandra Gail Lambert	My Withered Legs and Other Essays	University of Georgia Press	Winner	
Lesbian Memoir/ Biography	Nikkya Hargrove	Mama: A Queer Black Woman's Story of a Family Lost and Found	Algonquin Books | Little, Brown & Company	Finalist	
Lesbian Memoir/ Biography	Julie Delporte	Portrait of a Body	Drawn & Quarterly	Finalist	
Lesbian Memoir/ Biography	Julie Marie Wade	The Mary Years	TRP: The University Press of SHSU	Finalist	
Lesbian Memoir/ Biography	Erica N. Cardwell	Wrong is Not My Name	The Feminist Press	Finalist	
Lesbian Poetry	Omotara James	Song of My Softening	Alice James Books	Winner	
Lesbian Poetry	Saretta Morgan	Alt-Nature	Coffee House Press	Finalist	
Lesbian Poetry	Tanya Olson	Born Backwards	YesYes Books	Finalist	
Lesbian Poetry	Koss	Dancing Backwards Towards Pluperfect	Diode Editions	Finalist	
Lesbian Poetry	Dawn Lundy Martin	Instructions for the Lovers	Nightboat Books	Finalist	
Lesbian Poetry	Rae Gouirand	The Velvet Book	Cornerstone Press	Finalist	
Lesbian Romance	Alison Cochrun	Here We Go Again	Atria Books	Winner	
Lesbian Romance	Jae	Bachelorette Number Twelve	Ylva Publishing	Finalist	
Lesbian Romance	Carrie Byrd	Loser of the Year	Ylva Publishing	Finalist	
Lesbian Romance	Liza Wemakor	Loving Safoa	Neon Hemlock	Finalist	
Lesbian Romance	Lori G. Matthews	Outlaw Hearts	Bella Books	Finalist	
LGBTQ Anthology	Rae Theodore and Nat Burns	Swagger: A Celebration of the Butch Experience	Flashpoint Publications	Winner	
LGBTQ Anthology	Marwan Kaabour	The Queer Arab Glossary	Saqi Books	Finalist	
LGBTQ Anthology	Remi Recchia	Transmasculine Poetics: Filling the Gap in Literature & the Silences Around Us	Sundress Publications	Finalist	
LGBTQ Anthology	Edited by Rob Costello; stories by: Kalynn Bayron, David Bowles, Shae Carys, H.E. Edgmon, Michael Thomas Ford, Val Howlett, Brittany Johnson, Naomi Kanakia, Claire Kann, Jonathan Lenore Kastin, Sarah Maxfield, Sam J. Miller, Alexandra Villasante, and Merc Fenn Wolfmoor	We Mostly Come Out At Night: 15 Queer Tales of Monsters, Angels & Other Creatures	Running Press Teens	Finalist	
LGBTQ Anthology	Dustin Brookshire	When I Was Straight: A Tribute to Maureen Seaton	Harbor Editions	Finalist	
LGBTQ Children's	Phil Bildner; illustrated by Daniel J. O'Brien	Glenn Burke, Game Changer: The Man Who Invented the High Five	Farrar, Straus and Giroux Books for Young Readers	Winner	
LGBTQ Children's	Seamus Kirst	Harper Becomes a Big Sister	American Psychological Association Magination Press	Finalist	
LGBTQ Children's	Sarah Hoffman and Ian Hoffman	Jacob's Missing Book	American Psychological Association Magination Press	Finalist	
LGBTQ Children's	Molly Beth Griffin; Illustrated by Anait Semirdzhyan	Just Us	Charlesbridge	Finalist	
LGBTQ Children's	Lee Wind; illustrated by Jieting Chen	Love of the Half-Eaten Peach	Reycraft	Finalist	
LGBTQ Comics	Lonnie Garcia	Putty Pygmalion	Silver Sprocket	Winner	
LGBTQ Comics	Magdalene Visaggio; illustrated by Paulina Ganucheau	Girlmode	HarperCollins	Finalist	
LGBTQ Comics	Tenacity Plys	SN_33P'sCoolZine.pdf	fifth wheel press	Finalist	
LGBTQ Comics	Sarah Leavitt	Something, Not Nothing: A Story of Grief and Love	Arsenal Pulp Press	Finalist	
LGBTQ Comics	Viktor T. Kerney and William O. Tyler	We Belong: An All-Black/All-Queer Sci-Fi/Fantasy Comics Anthology	Stacked Deck Press	Finalist	
LGBTQ Drama	Makram Ayache	The Green Line (خطّ التماس)	Playwrights Canada Press	Winner	
LGBTQ Drama	Jesus I. Valles	Bathhouse.pptx	Yale University Press	Finalist	
LGBTQ Drama	Nick Green	Casey and Diana	Scirocco Drama (J. Gordon Shillingford Publishing)	Finalist	
LGBTQ Drama	Karen Hartman	Goldie, Max & Milk	Samuel French, A Concord Theatricals imprint	Finalist	
LGBTQ Drama	Sarah Mantell	In the Amazon Warehouse Parking Lot	Playwrights Horizons	Finalist	
LGBTQ+ Romance and Erotica	Fearne Hill	Oyster	Self-published	Winner	
LGBTQ+ Romance and Erotica	Colin Dereham	Bradford, Bru and Brendan Too	Self-published	Finalist	
LGBTQ+ Romance and Erotica	Anne Shade	Leather, Lace and Locs	Bold Strokes Books	Finalist	
LGBTQ+ Romance and Erotica	Jena Doyle	Midsummer	Self-published	Finalist	
LGBTQ+ Romance and Erotica	Isla Olsen	Mr. Blue Sky	Self-published	Finalist	
LGBTQ Middle Grade	Elisa Stone Leahy	Mallory in Full Color	Quill Tree Books | HarperCollins	Winner	
LGBTQ Middle Grade	Taylor Tracy	Murray Out of Water	HarperCollins	Finalist	
LGBTQ Middle Grade	Maggie Horn	Noah Frye Gets Crushed	HarperCollins	Finalist	
LGBTQ Middle Grade	Marieke Nijkamp	Splinter & Ash	Greenwillow Books | HarperCollins	Finalist	
LGBTQ Middle Grade	Justine Pucella Winans	Wishbone	Bloomsbury	Finalist	
LGBTQ Mystery	Katrina Carrasco	Rough Trade	MCD	Winner	
LGBTQ Mystery	Katie Siegel	Charlotte Illes is Not a Teacher	Kensington	Finalist	
LGBTQ Mystery	Alyssa Cole	One of Us Knows	William Morrow	Finalist	
LGBTQ Mystery	Lev A. C. Rosen	Rough Pages	Tor Publishing Group	Finalist	
LGBTQ Mystery	Akira Otani; translated by Sam Bett	The Night of Baba Yaga	Soho Crime	Finalist	
LGBTQ Nonfiction	Michael Waters	The Other Olympians	Farrar, Straus and Giroux	Winner	
LGBTQ Nonfiction	Rebecca L. Davis	Fierce Desires	W. W. Norton & Company	Finalist	
LGBTQ Nonfiction	Diane Ehrensaft and Michelle Jurkiewicz	Gender Explained: A New Understanding of Identity in a Gender Creative World	The Experiment	Finalist	
LGBTQ Nonfiction	Amin Ghaziani	Long Live Queer Nightlife: How the Closing of Gay Bars Sparked a Revolution	Princeton University Press	Finalist	
LGBTQ Nonfiction	Gemma Rolls-Bentley	Queer Art: From Canvas to Club, and the Spaces Between	Frances Lincoln	Finalist	
LGBTQ Poetry	Eduardo Martínez-Leyva	Cowboy Park	University of Wisconsin Press	Winner	
LGBTQ Poetry	Jes Battis	I Hate Parties	Nightwood Editions	Finalist	
LGBTQ Poetry	Zoe Whittall	No Credit River	Book*hug Press	Finalist	
LGBTQ Poetry	Emilia Phillips	Nonbinary Bird of Paradise	University of Akron Press	Finalist	
LGBTQ Poetry	Cass Donish	Your Dazzling Death	Alfred A. Knopf	Finalist	
LGBTQ Speculative Fiction	August Clarke	Metal From Heaven	Erewhon Books	Winner	
LGBTQ Speculative Fiction	Chuck Tingle	Bury Your Gays	Tor Publishing Group	Finalist	
LGBTQ Speculative Fiction	C.G. Malburi	Markless	Levine Querido	Finalist	
LGBTQ Speculative Fiction	Sascha Stronach	The Sunforge	Saga Press | Simon and Schuster	Finalist	
LGBTQ Speculative Fiction	Caro De Robertis	The Palace of Eros	Simon and Schuster	Finalist	
LGBTQ Studies	Susan Stryker; edited by McKenzie Wark	When Monsters Speak: A Susan Stryker Reader	Duke University Press	Winner	
LGBTQ Studies	Mat Fournier	Dysphoric Modernism: Undoing Gender in French Literature	Columbia University Press	Finalist	
LGBTQ Studies	Clare Croft	Jill Johnston in Motion: Dance, Writing, and Lesbian Life	Duke University Press	Finalist	
LGBTQ Studies	Mary Zaborskis	Queer Childhoods: Institutional Futures of Indigeneity, Race, and Disability	New York University Press	Finalist	
LGBTQ Studies	Matthew H. Sommer	The Fox Spirit, the Stone Maiden, and Other Transgender Histories from Late Imperial China	Columbia University Press	Finalist	
LGBTQ Young Adult	K. Ancrum	Icarus	HarperCollins	Winner	
LGBTQ Young Adult	Logan-Ashley Kisner	Old Wounds	Random House Children's Books	Finalist	
LGBTQ Young Adult	Kamilah Cole	So Let Them Burn	Little, Brown Books for Young Readers	Finalist	
LGBTQ Young Adult	H. A. Clarke	The Feast Makers	Erewhon Books	Finalist	
LGBTQ Young Adult	Chatham Greenfield	Time and Time Again	Bloomsbury	Finalist	
Transgender Fiction	Nino Bulling	Firebugs	Drawn & Quarterly	Winner	
Transgender Fiction	RJ McDaniel	All Things Seen and Unseen: A Novel	ECW Press	Finalist	
Transgender Fiction	Alvina Chamberland	Love the World or Get Killed Trying	Noemi Press	Finalist	
Transgender Fiction	June Martin	Love/Aggression	tRaum Books	Finalist	
Transgender Fiction	Harman Burns	Yellow Barks Spider	Radiant Press	Finalist	
Transgender Nonfiction	KB Brookins	Pretty	Alfred A. Knopf	Winner	
Transgender Nonfiction	Nico Lang	American Teenager: How Trans Kids Are Surviving Hate and Finding Joy in a Turbulent Era	Harry N. Abrams	Finalist	
Transgender Nonfiction	Vera Blossom	How to Fuck Like a Girl	DOPAMINE Books	Finalist	
Transgender Nonfiction	CeCé Telfer	Make it Count	Grand Central Publishing	Finalist	
Transgender Nonfiction	Nat Raha and Mijke van der Drift	Trans Femme Futures: Abolitionist Ethics for Transfeminist Worlds	Pluto Press	Finalist	
Transgender Poetry	Zefyr Lisowski	Girl Work	Noemi Press	Winner	
Transgender Poetry	Jaya Jacobo; translated by Christian Jil Benitez	Arasahas: Poems from the Tropics	PAWA Press	Finalist	
Transgender Poetry	Oliver Baez Bendorf	Consider the Rooster	Nightboat Books	Finalist	
Transgender Poetry	Joshua Jennifer Espinoza	I Don't Want to Be Understood	Alice James Books	Finalist	
Transgender Poetry	Spencer Williams	TRANZ	Four Way Books	Finalist	
