= List of African-American LGBTQ people =

This is a list of Black/African Americans who are also members of queer communities including but not limited to lesbian, gay, bisexual, transgender, queer, intersex and asexual people.

== Historical figures ==
Name	Lifetime	Nationality	Notable as	Communities
Alain LeRoy Locke	1885–1954	American	Philosopher, writer, educator, art patron	Queer, Gay
Barbara Jordan	1936–1996	American	Lawyer, educator, politician, first African-American woman elected to the United States House of Representatives	LGBTQ+

== Government and politics ==
Name	Political Party	State	Occupation
Andrew Gillum	Democratic	Florida	Mayor of Tallahassee
Lori Lightfoot	Democratic	Illinois	Mayor of Chicago
Vernetta Alston	Democratic	North Carolina	North Carolina State Representative
Stormie Forte	Democratic	North Carolina	Raleigh City Councilwoman
Gordon Fox	Democratic	Rhode Island	State Legislature
Rashad Taylor	Democratic	Georgia	State Legislature
Althea Garrison	Republican	Massachusetts	Massachusetts State Representative
Pat Spearman	Democratic	Nevada	Nevada State Senator
Marcus Brandon	Democratic	North Carolina	North Carolina State Representative
Ron Oden	Democratic	California	Mayor
Bruce Harris	Republican	New Jersey	Mayor
Keith St. John	Democratic	New York	City Councilman
Darrin P. Gayles	Democratic	Florida	United States Federal Judge
Kelvin Atkinson	Democratic	Nevada	Former Nevada Senate Majority Leader
Ritchie Torres	Democratic	New York	US Representative
Mondaire Jones	Democratic	New York	US Representative
Everton Blair	Democratic	Georgia	US Representative
Erick Russell	Democratic	Connecticut	Connecticut State Treasurer
Laphonza Butler	Democratic	California	US Senator

== Entertainment and media ==
Name	Occupation
McKinley Belcher III	Actor
Kemah Bob	Comedian and drag king
Sherman Hemsley	Actor
Lee Daniels	Film and television producer
Little Richard	Singer
Don Lemon	CNN News anchor and journalist
Bessie Smith	Singer
Raven-Symoné	Actress and singer
Patrick Ian Polk	Film director, producer, singer, and actor
Frank Ocean	Singer, songwriter, and rapper
Wanda Sykes	Actress and comedian
Kevin Abstract	Singer, songwriter, director and rapper
Daryl Stephens	Actor
Angel Haze	Rapper
LZ Granderson	Journalist and commentator CNN and ESPN
Charles M. Blow	Columnist for The New York Times
Paris Barclay	Director, producer, and writer
Andre Leon Talley	Journalist and editor
Terrance Dean	Writer and author
Audre Lorde	Author and feminist
Alice Walker	Author and poet
Tracy Chapman	Singer
RuPaul	Actor, drag queen, and television personality
Tarell Alvin McCraney	Playwright and actor
James Baldwin	Author
Janet Mock	Writer, TV host, and transgender rights activist
Isis King	Model and designer
Alvin Ailey	Choreographer and activist
Azealia Banks	Rapper
Nell Carter	Actress and singer
Billy Porter	Actor, singer, fashion icon
Laverne Cox	Actress and LGBTQ advocate
Janelle Monáe	Singer-songwriter, actress, model, and record producer
Mo'Nique	Comedian and actress
Sir Lady Java	Drag queen, actress, and transgender rights activist
Amandla Stenberg	Actress and singer
Tessa Thompson	Actress
Mel Tomlinson	Ballet dancer and choreographer
Karamo Brown	Television personality and activist
François Clemmons	Actor and singer
Lil Nas X	Rapper, singer, and songwriter
Harrison David Rivers	Playwright
Luther Vandross	Singer, songwriter, record producer.
Todrick Hall	Singer, songwriter, dancer, producer, director, choreographer
Le1f	Rapper and producer
Colman Domingo	Actor, playwright, director, producer, professor.
Angie Stardust	Singer, actress, drag artist
Queen Latifah	Rapper and Actress
Amythyst Kiah	Singer, songwriter, musician
Marlon Riggs	filmmaker
LeRoy Whitfield	Journalist
Terry Blade	Singer, songwriter, lyricist
Emira D'Spain	Model, social media influencer, magazine director
Ma Rainey	Singer
Niecy Nash	Actress and comedian
Tyler, the Creator	Rapper
Justin Simien	Filmmaker
Steve Lacy	Singer, musician
Khalid	Singer, songwriter
Jason Collins	Basketball player
Kehlani	Singer, musician
Honey Dijon	DJ, producer
Joy Oladokun	Singer-songwriter
Rivers Solomon	Author
Akwaeke Emezi	Author, Musician
Steven Thrasher	Journalist, academic
Lee Rodriguez	Actor
Victoria Monét	Singer-songwriter
Shamir	Singer
Ice Spice	Rapper
Doechii	Singer, rapper
Yves Tumor	Singer
Alex Newell	Actor, singer
Kacen Callender	Author
Jordan E. Cooper	Actor, Writer
Michaela Jaé Rodriguez	Actress, Musician
TS Madison	Media personality
Cardi B	Musician
Phillip B. Williams	Author
Danez Smith	Author
KB Brookins	Author
Kiana Ledé	Singer
Shea Couleé	American drag queen, musician, actor
Dorian Corey	American drag performer and fashion designer
Honey Davenport	American drag performer, singer, songwriter, actor and activist
David Hampton	Con artist
Angela Davis	Political activist, academic
CeCe McDonald	LGBTQ advocate
DeRay Mckesson	Activist and educator
Marsha P. Johnson	Gay liberation activist and Stonewall Riot veteran
Bayard Rustin	Political and Black rights activist
Flawless Shade	Drag queen and make-up artist
Kornbread Jeté	Drag queen
Mary Anne Adams	Activist for Black community/Black, elderly lesbians, academic, founder of NAMI NOBLA
Miss Major Griffin-Gracy	Community organizer for trans rights
Imani Barbarin	Disability rights activist, writer, public speaker

== Sports ==
Name	Sport
Glenn Burke	Baseball
David Denson	Baseball
Jason Collins	Basketball
Brittney Griner	Basketball
Candace Parker	Basketball
Layshia Clarendon	Basketball
Ryan Russell	Football
Laurie Hernandez	Gymnastics
Fallon Fox	Mixed Martial Arts
Sha'Carri Richardson	Track and Field
Erica Bougard	Track and Field
Kerron Clement	Track and Field
Aleia Hobbs	Track and Field
Jolanda Jones	Track and Field
Marion Jones	Track and Field
Raven Saunders	Track and Field
Yared Nuguse	Track and Field
CeCe Telfer	Track and Field
Octavius Terry	Track and Field
Andraya Yearwood	Track and Field
