= WFPC =

WFPC may refer to:

- WFPC-LP, a low-power radio station (105.3 FM) licensed to Rindge, New Hampshire, United States
- Wide Field and Planetary Camera, a camera installed on the Hubble Space Telescope
