= Lin Jingyi =

Lin Jingyi may refer to following individuals of which name in Chinese character can be transliterated to Hanyu Pinyin:

- 林静一 (Lín Jìngyī; born 1945), Japanese manga artist, animator and illustrator
- 林靜儀 (Lín Jìngyí; born 1974), Taiwanese physician and politician
