= Tarbell Brook =

Tributary of the Millers River in New England

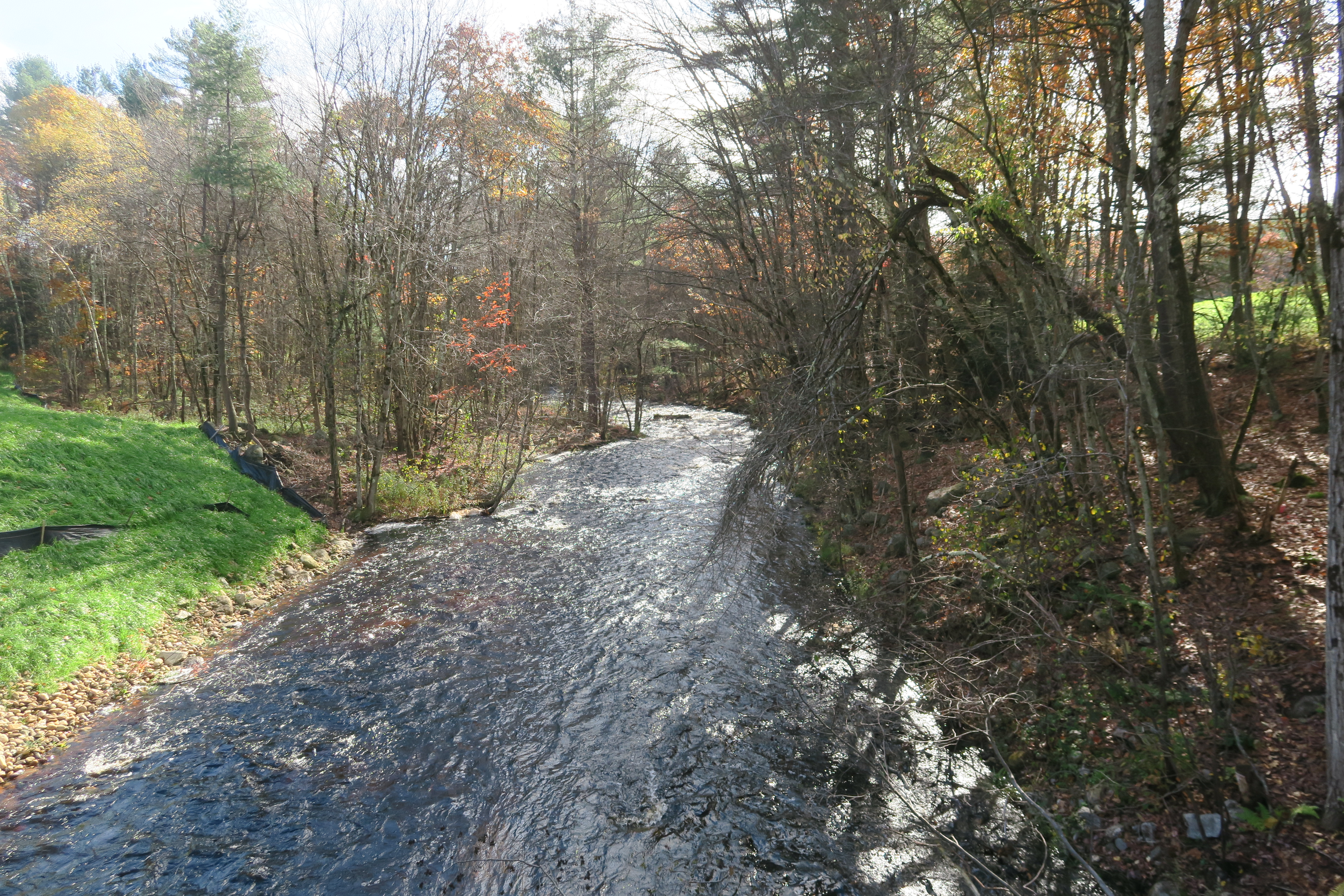
- Tarbell Brook in Winchendon, Massachusetts

- Location within Massachusetts Location within New Hampshire Location within the United States

Location
- Country: United States
- States: New Hampshire, Massachusetts
- Counties: Cheshire, NH, Worcester, MA
- Towns: Rindge, NH, Fitzwilliam, NH, Winchendon, MA

Physical characteristics
- Source: Pearly Lake
  - location: Rindge, NH
  - coordinates: 42°46′8″N 72°4′7″W
  - elevation: 1,007 ft (307 m)
- Mouth: Millers River
  - location: Winchendon, MA
  - coordinates: 42°41′15″N 72°4′54″W
  - elevation: 837 ft (255 m)
- Length: 10.1 mi (16.3 km)

Basin features
- Tributaries
  - left: Robbins Brook
  - right: Sip Pond Brook, Spud Brook

Tarbell Brook is a 10.1-mile-long (16.3 km) stream located in southwestern New Hampshire and northern Massachusetts in the United States. It is a tributary of the Millers River, itself a tributary of the Connecticut River, which flows to Long Island Sound.

Tarbell Brook rises in the western part of Rindge, New Hampshire, at the outlet of Pearly Lake, and flows south to the Damon Reservoirs. The brook then passes into Winchendon, Massachusetts, reaching the Millers River approximately 2 miles (3 km) west of the town center.

== History ==
It bears the name of Lieutenant Samuel Tarbell (1744–1828), a Revolutionary War Minuteman who settled in Rindge with his wife Beatrice Carter in 1773, soon thereafter building a watermill at the outflow of Pearly Lake (formerly known as Tarbell Pond). Although the mill is long gone, Tarbell's Cape Cod style house nearby still presides over Route 119.

== See also ==
- List of rivers of Massachusetts
- List of rivers of New Hampshire
