= Firebugs (graphic novel) =

2022 graphic novel by Nino Bulling

- Page count: 164 pages
- Publisher: Edition Moderne and Colorama

Creative team
- Creator: Nino Bulling

Original publication
- Date of publication: 2022
- Language: German, English
- ISBN: 978-3-03731-234-6 (German); 978-3-03731-236-0 (English)

Translation
- Publisher: Drawn & Quarterly
- Date: 2024
- ISBN: 978-1-770-46705-7

Firebugs is a graphic novel by Berlin artist Nino Bulling. It is their debut English-language novel and won the 2025 Lambda Literary Award for Transgender Fiction.

== Premise ==
The graphic novel begins in Paris, where Ingken parties at a nightclub but feels uncomfortable and eventually leaves. Later they return to their apartment in Berlin. They live with their girlfriend Lily, who is a trans American woman.

Ingken tells Lily that they don't think of themselves as a woman or a man, and Lily responds supportively, helping them navigate their gender dysphoria. However, Ingken's anxiety grows over how to define who they are and what they want to change, and over the months that follow, Lily gets increasingly frustrated at Ingken's doubts and hesitations. News about wildfires and the climate crisis worsen Ingken's anxiety, as well as jealousy over Lily's new lover, who she grows closer to within the bounds of Ingken and Lily's open relationship. Ingken and Lily grow estranged before the novel's ambiguous end.

== Creation ==
Firebugs was first developed for part of a 2022 Kassel art exhibition, Documenta fifteen, under the name abfackeln. Nino Bulling, the graphic novel's creator, described their goals for the work:

I wanted to write a book with no resolution in which the expectation of a transition story is left unfulfilled. In my experience, the question of gender is never entirely decided or resolved. It presents itself again and again, every day in fact, in many forms, of which a body and its materiality is merely one.

Bulling credited Seiichi Hayashi's Red Colored Elegy as their primary influence for the development of Firebugs. They said they wanted to use the same sparse dialogue-based narrative style to explore a t4t (trans for trans) relationship. Hayashi evolved this style from the French New Wave film movement. Bulling's portrayal of gender dysphoria and gender dissonance were informed by Andrea Long Chu's Females.

== Themes and contents ==
Most of the novel is drawn in black and white, with red frames. Firebugs also contains red accents for certain elements like sound effects, flames, and the paths of insects. Brian Nicholson, reviewing an earlier version of the work for The Comics Journal, connects Bulling's art style to that of Henri Matisse.

H Felix Chau Bradley, writing for Xtra Magazine, compared Firebugs to the story "Hazel and Christopher" in Casey Plett's A Dream of a Woman. Bradley concludes that in the main relationships in both stories, "love isn’t lacking; however, the simple fact of both partners being trans does not automatically lead to mutual support, patience or long-term compatibility."

== Reception ==
Firebugs won the 2025 Lambda Literary Award for Transgender Fiction.

Firebugs was on The New York Times's list of best graphic novels for 2024, which concluded that "the book's images are a collection of little miracles". Library Journal's starred review by Tom Batten labeled the novel a "tender, probing exploration of queer identity in a world seemingly on the verge of collapse, brought to life with warmth and grace by Bulling’s [...] exceptionally fluid, emotionally evocative linework."

Publishers Weekly said "Bulling’s script is more meditative than propulsive, but its depiction of melancholia—the way a crisis of identity can feel both significant and infinitesimal in the face of actual apocalypse—is often moving." Alexandra Sweny, for The Montreal Review of Books, praised the novel's "moments of subtle attention to the natural world [...] Careful symbolism is woven throughout." Lindsay Pereira, for Broken Frontier, noted that "this is a book that requires multiple readings because there is so much one can take away from it [...] There is beauty here, but it is never obvious."
