= American Teen =

American Teen may refer to:

- American Teen (film), a 2008 documentary film by Nanette Burstein
- American Teen (album), a 2017 album by Khalid
  - "American Teen", the title track of the album

== See also ==
- "American Teenager", a 2022 song by Ethel Cain
- American Teenager (book), a 2024 non-fiction book by Nico Lang
