= Franklin Pierce University =

Private university in Rindge, New Hampshire, US

- Former name: Franklin Pierce College (1962–2007)
- Motto: Ex umbris ad lucem
- Motto in English: From the shadows to the light
- Type: Private university
- Established: November 14, 1962; 63 years ago
- Accreditation: NECHE
- Academic affiliations: NHCUC
- President: Peter Eden
- Provost: Catherine M. Paden
- Students: 1,750
- Location: Rindge, New Hampshire, U.S. 42.7823°N 72.0573°W
- Campus: 1,200 acres; Rural
- Colors: Crimson grey
- Nickname: Ravens
- Sporting affiliations: NCAA Division II - NE-10; East Coast; NEWHA
- Mascot: Rocky the Raven
- Website: franklinpierce.edu
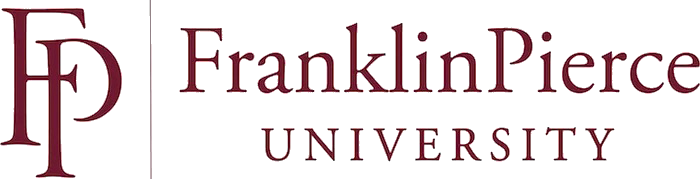

Franklin Pierce University is a private university in Rindge, New Hampshire, United States. It was founded as Franklin Pierce College in 1962, combining a liberal arts foundation with coursework for professional preparation.

The school gained university status in 2007 and is accredited by the New England Association of Schools and Colleges (NEASC). It has an enrollment of 1,400 students and overlooks Pearly Pond, a few miles from Mount Monadnock. The campus covers approximately 1,200 acres (4.9 km^{2}). Peter Eden has been president of Franklin Pierce University since 2024. The school also operates the College of Graduate and Professional Studies with campuses in Manchester, New Hampshire and Lebanon, New Hampshire, and Goodyear, Arizona. The college at Rindge houses three institutes: the Marlin Fitzwater Center for Communication; the Monadnock Institute of Nature, Place, and Culture; and the New England Center for Civic Life.

== History ==
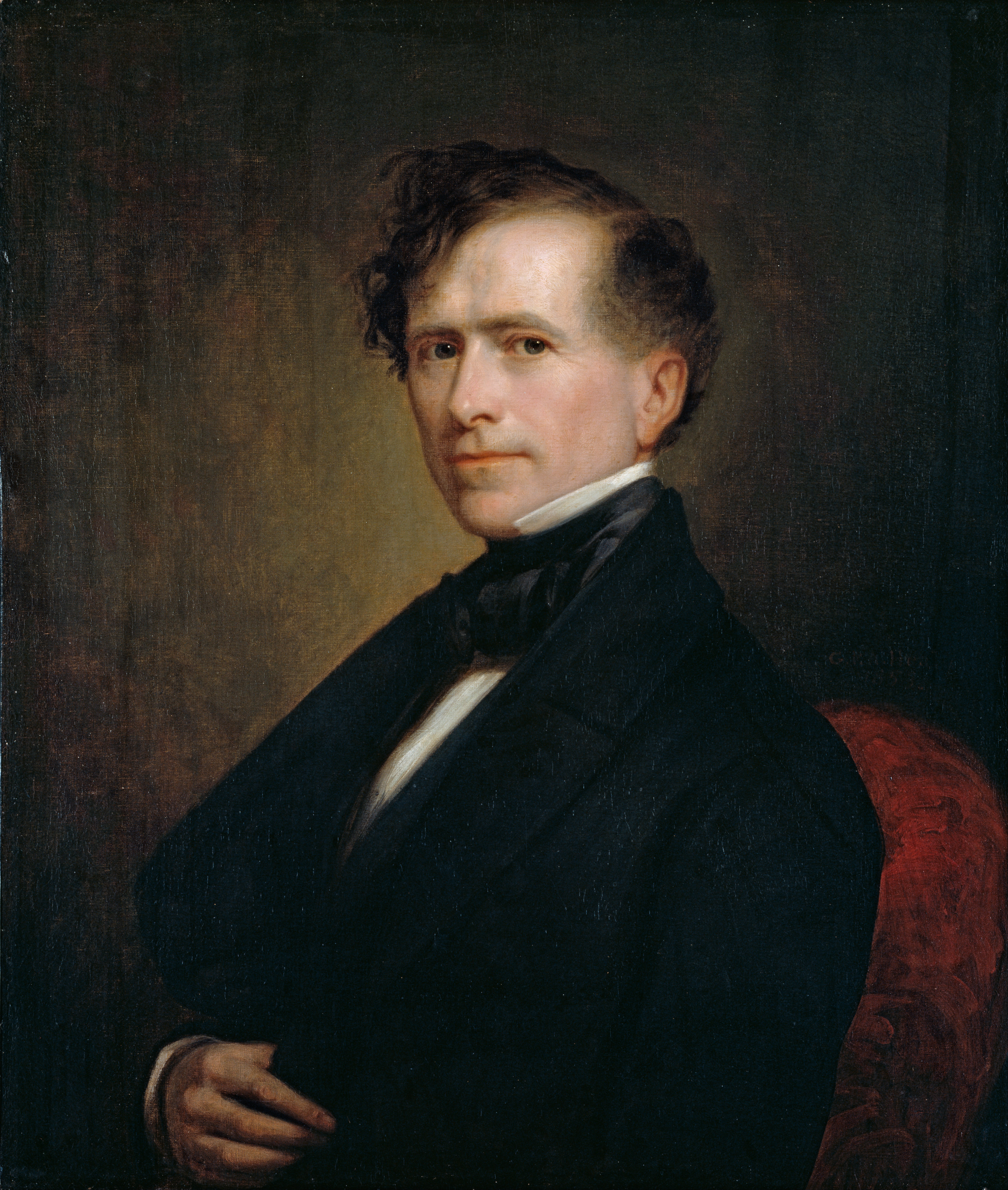
Franklin Pierce – 14th President of the United States

The school was founded by Frank S. DiPietro in 1962 as Franklin Pierce College, named after Franklin Pierce, the 14th president of the United States and the only U.S. president from New Hampshire. The school opened its doors to its first set of students in the winter of 1963. They began with just under 100 students and six full-time professors. The campus consisted of four older buildings known as the Manor, Rindge Hall, The White House, and Ravencroft Theatre. Many classes were conducted in downtown Rindge, while other buildings there were used as residence halls.

In the winter of 1964, Crestview Hall was built, and by then the college had 150 students. That building was used for both dorms and classrooms, enabling the college to move completely to its current location. In the fall of 1965, Monadnock Hall was built for more classrooms on the ground floor and residence halls on the above floor. Later that school year in 1966, Edgewood was built. At that time the cafeteria moved from the Manor to the ground floor with residence halls on the two upper floors. Also that year, the DiGregorio building was built and housed a post office along with student lounges, a snack bar, and book store.

Still, despite the additional buildings, the campus remained overcrowded as the student body grew to over 500 students. In the fall of 1966, Granite Hall opened as a dormitory with health services in the basement. In 1967, New Hampshire Hall opened for more dormitories with the fire department in the basement. Mt. Washington Hall was built as an extension to New Hampshire in 1968 and also housed the music department. Also that year, the Fieldhouse was built to accommodate sports programs.

The school still lacked a full library, though a small limited one was in Monadnock, so in 1967 construction for a library/resource center began and was completed in 1969. The library moved from one of the classroom/dorm buildings to the resource center along with academic and administrative offices. Eventually years later, the television production center, radio station, computer labs, and the cable TV system headend would be located there. In 1971, Marcucella Hall was built for classrooms, enabling most of the classrooms in Crestview and all of the ones in Monadnock to relocate there. The Manor remained a student center as Rindge Hall became financial aid and registration offices. Franklin Pierce held its first graduation in 1967 and became accredited by the New England Association of Schools and Colleges (NEASC) in 1968.

While the college was overcrowded by 1970 despite building projects, the student body began to shrink by 1972. The college stayed roughly the same size throughout the 1970s. Financially, the school began to suffer by 1972 and by 1975 was in serious financial distress. In 1975, Frank DiPietro stepped down as college president, and former New Hampshire governor Walter Peterson took over. Under Peterson, over the next five years, the college returned to financial solvency.

In the late 1970s to the early 1980s, the focus was maintenance of the student body rather than growth. By the early '80s, the college was ready for expansion. In 1985, the Emily Flint Campus Center began to be built and opened in the fall of 1986. This would house the post office (moved from Degregorio building), Student Activities (moved from the Manor), conference centers, cafeteria (moved from Edgewood), snack bar (which moved from Degregorio Building), and book store (also from the Degregorio building), among other uses. The former cafeteria became residence halls on one side and a workout room on the other side. The Degregorio building became the registrar's and bursar's office. A cable television system was installed in 1986 but dismantled in 2004 and replaced with the town's cable system. In 1987, trailers were added to house students.

In 1988, apartment-type residences for juniors and seniors called Mountainview were added. The remaining campus would be for freshmen and sophomores and some upperclassmen. Throughout the '70s and '80s, satellite campuses were added around New Hampshire mostly for adult education. In the mid-1990s, Northwoods were built for more apartments replacing the 1987 trailers.

In 1995, Walter Peterson stepped down and George Haggerty took over as college president. That year North Fields Activity Center, an athletic building also known as "the Bubble", was built, and Crestview was converted into strictly classroom buildings. In 1998, Cheshire Hall was built with suite-style housing and apartment-style housing. In 2002, the library building added a new floor, and this became the Fitzwater Communication Center.

In 2007, the college gained university status and was renamed Franklin Pierce University. In 2008, the White House was torn down, and a new classroom building called Petrocelli Hall was built in its place. In 2009, James F. Birge became the university's fourth president. In 2012, the university welcomed 550 freshmen, the largest group in its 50-year history, as well as 56 transfer students and 10 part-time students, for a total of 616 new students. In the same year, the university completed $1 million in renovations to its dining hall as well as completed construction of the Dr. Arthur and Martha Pappas Health Science and Athletic Training Center to support its new Health Sciences program.

Andrew Card began his tenure as the fifth president of Franklin Pierce University in December 2014. On August 28, 2015, President Card announced the demolition of the Ravencroft Theatre and Crestview Hall, two buildings which had been closed and vacant since 2003 and 2008 respectively. Although not officially announced, the university has plans to build a new science center to support its growing health and natural sciences division on the site of the demolished Crestview Hall. This new building would replace Marcucella Hall, which currently functions as the university's science center. The university completed the demolition of the Ravencroft Theatre in October 2015, and Crestview Hall was razed in June 2016.

Following his relatively short tenure as president, Andrew Card announced his intent to step down from his post on August 1, 2016. With the Board of Trustees anticipating this transition due to Andrew Card's agreement to lead the institution for a limited duration, they named Kim Mooney, the institution's current provost and vice president for academic affairs, as the institution's sixth president. When Mooney began her tenure as president on August 1, 2016, she was the first alumna and woman to lead the institution.

Kim Mooney was officially installed as the institution's sixth president on September 23, 2017, the same day as Family Day and Homecoming weekend.

=== Presidents ===
- Frank DiPietro (1962–1975) (founder)
- Walter R. Peterson, Jr.( (1975–1995)
- George J. Hagerty (1995–2009)
- James F. Birge (2009–2015)
- Andrew Card (2015–2016)
- Kim Mooney (2016–2024)
- Peter Eden (2024-

== Academics ==
Franklin Pierce offers undergraduate programs in a variety of arts, sciences, and professional disciplines. The university also offers students master's degrees, doctoral degrees, and graduate certificate programs in business, education, and health sciences.

Franklin Pierce University has been accredited by the New England Association of Schools and Colleges or its successor since 1968.

== Campuses ==
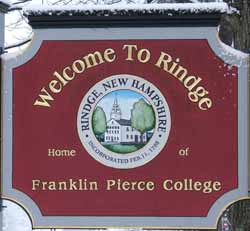
Rindge's town sign with the college name

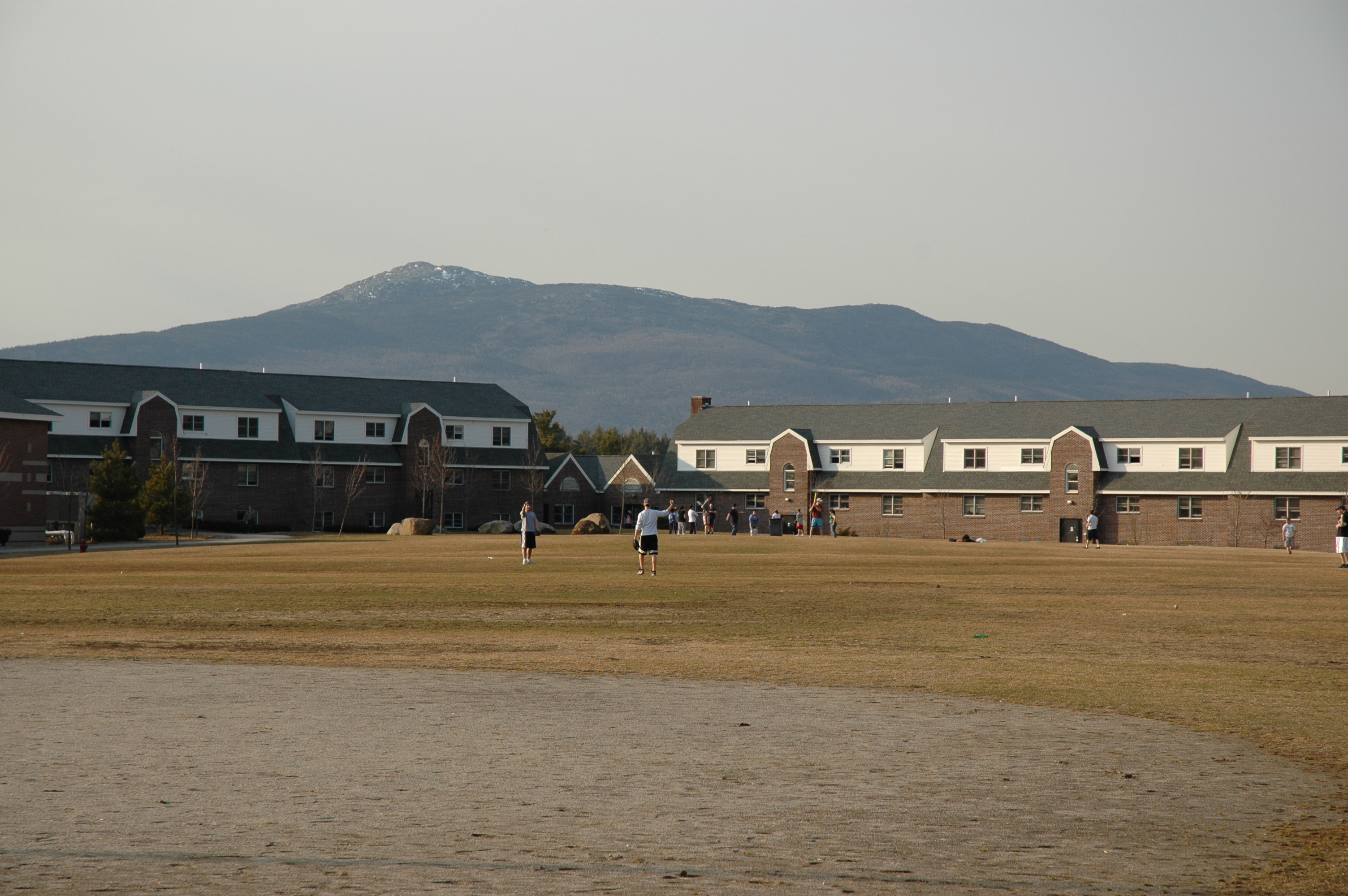
Mountain View apartments with Mount Monadnock towering in the background

=== Main campus ===
The college at Rindge, Franklin Pierce's traditional undergraduate campus, is located on 40 University Drive in Rindge, New Hampshire, and is situated on 1,200 acres (490 ha) of land. Franklin Pierce's main academic buildings include Petrocelli Hall, Marcucella Hall, the Fitzwater Center, the Pappas Center, Monadnock Hall, Cheney Hall, and the Yvonne S. Boice Performing Arts Center. The Frank S. DiPietro Library serves as the main library on campus and also houses additional classrooms and student support services.

The Emily Flint Campus Center is the main student activities building on campus which houses the Marketplace Cafeteria (main dining hall), Raven's Nest (late-night dining), post office, and a number of other student services.

The Grimshay-Gudewik Activity Center at Northfields or "The Bubble" is the hub of the university's Campus Recreation program. The Bubble serves as a recreation area for the entire campus population, as well as both a weight room and inclement-weather practice facility for Franklin Pierce's intercollegiate athletic programs. The Bubble is home to a complete cardio-strength area, a free weight area, two full tennis courts, two full basketball/volleyball courts, a 50-yard turf field and a two-lane track.

Franklin Pierce currently houses all on-campus students in a variety of residence halls, from large dormitory-style to apartment-style living. Residence halls on the Rindge campus include Granite Hall, New Hampshire Hall, Mount Washington Hall, Cheshire Hall, Edgewood Hall, Monadnock Hall, Mountain View and Northwoods Apartments, Lakeview Townhouses, and Sawmill Apartments.

Pearly Pond is at the base of campus, and Mount Monadnock overlooks the area.

=== Branch campuses ===
Besides the campus in Rindge, Franklin Pierce also operates the College of Graduate and Professional Studies, which has four campuses: two in New Hampshire, Manchester and Lebanon, Goodyear, Arizona and Round Rock, Texas.

== Athletics ==
Franklin Pierce offers 24 varsity sports, of which one, the Women's Ice Hockey team, competes at the NCAA Division I level within the New England Women's Hockey Alliance (NEWHA). The remaining 23 teams compete at the NCAA Division II level and, primarily, are members of the Northeast-10 Conference. Those programs include Baseball, Men's and Women's Basketball, Men's and Women's Cross Country, Field Hockey, Men's and Women's Golf, Men's Ice Hockey, Men's and Women's Lacrosse, Women's Rowing, Men's and Women's Soccer, Softball, Football, Men's and Women's Tennis, Men's and Women's Track and Field, and Women's Volleyball. The university offers men's and women's rugby at the club level, with both programs recognized by the New England Rugby Football Union (NERFU).

== Student life ==
Franklin Pierce University has almost 30 clubs and organizations on campus ranging from academics (Criminal Justice, Education, History, etc.) to community service to performing arts.

=== Pierce Media Group ===
The Pierce Media Group, or PMG, is the campus media group that consists of the Pierce Arrow, PMG News Center, FPTV 25, The Talon 105.3FM WFPC-LP, Ravens Sports Network, Four Corners Marketing, and thefitzonline.com.

All the media outlets are a part of the Marlin Fitzwater Center for Communication. Any student can easily participate in any facet of the PMG, even if they have no experience in marketing, advertising, production, or journalism.

Franklin Pierce University holds an FCC broadcast license for WFPC-LP, The Talon 105.3 FM. The station features hourly news briefs that consist of information from the Associated Press news feed and student sources.

The Pierce Arrow, the student newspaper, is the oldest student group on campus.

FPTV 25 offers both student-created content and studio-produced feature-length films. Two feature films are shown monthly. FPTV 25 has a mix of entertainment and sports programming as well as a weekly thirty-minute newscast.

Four Corners Marketing offers students the opportunity to sell advertisements both to clubs on campus as well as businesses off campus to be placed in The Pierce Arrow or FPTV25.

Ravens Sports Network broadcasts games of the varsity athletic programs live, giving complete coverage of the Division II competition.

=== Student Government Association ===
The executive board consists of the president of the SGA, the Vice President of the SGA, the Secretary of the SGA, the Treasurer of the SGA, and the Parliamentarian of the SGA.

=== Franklin Pierce Fire Company ===
At one time, the campus was home to one of the only fully student-run fire companies in the world. Franklin Pierce Fire formerly operated as an engine company under the town of Rindge Fire Department and responds to all fire related emergencies on campus. The company was headed by four student fire officers, as well as a varying number of student members serving as firefighters.

== Notable alumni ==
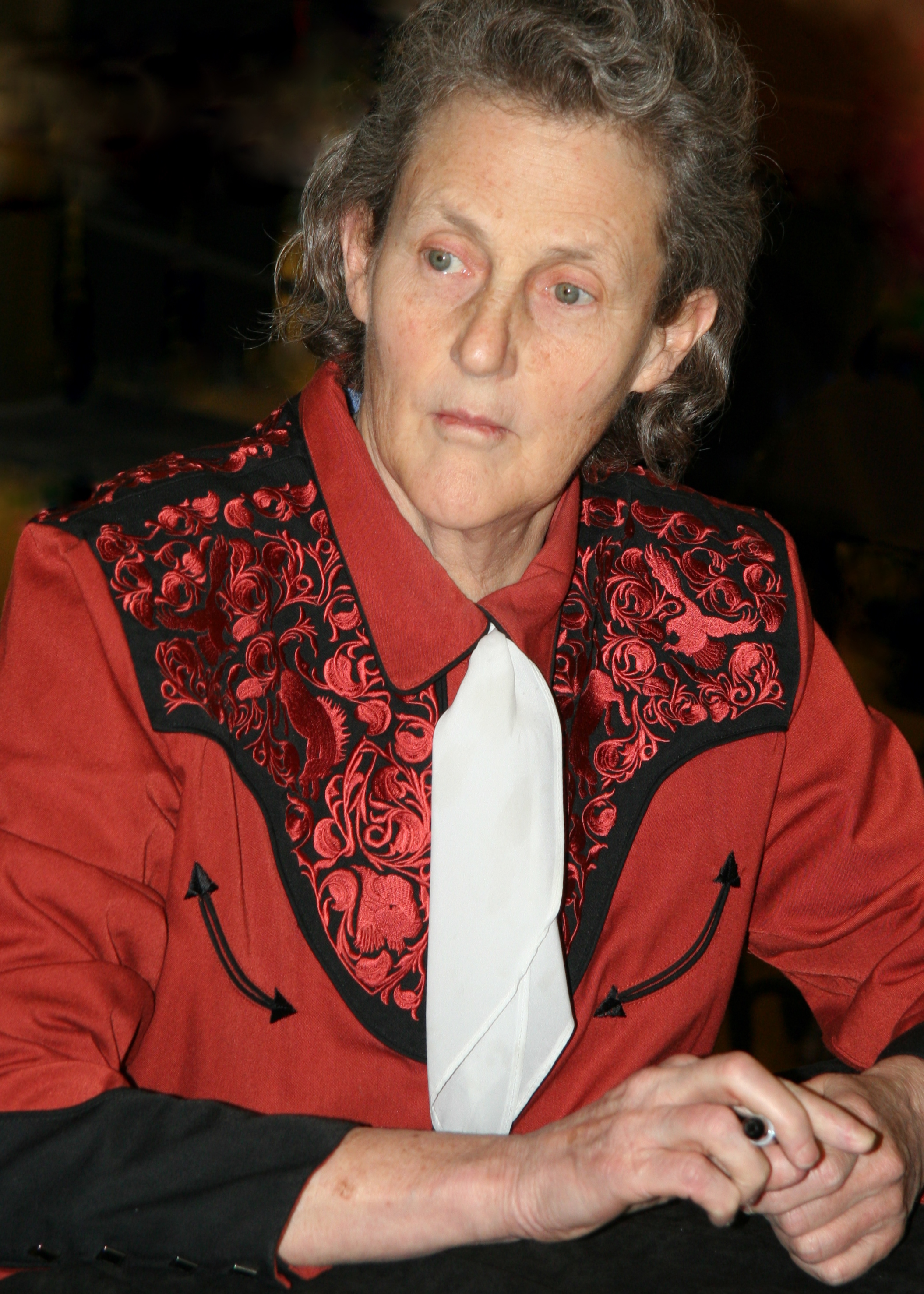
Temple Grandin

- Temple Grandin (b. 1947), animal behavior researcher
- Rebekah Harkness (1915–1982), founder of the Harkness Ballet
- Steve Hathaway (b. 1990), pitcher
- Johannah Leedham (b. 1987), British basketball player
- Minna Mustonen (b. 1977), soccer player
- Henry Simmons (b. 1970), actor
- Cece Telfer (b. 1999), first openly transgender person to win an NCAA title
- Brandon Whipple, politician, former mayor of Wichita, Kansas
- Devin Sheehan (b. 1982), Holyoke, MA School Committee Member and President of the National School Boards Association
