= Love the World or Get Killed Trying =

2024 novel by Alvina Chamberland

- Author: Alvina Chamberland
- Language: English
- Genre: Autofiction
- Publisher: Noemi Press
- Publication date: March 2024
- Publication place: U.S.
- Pages: 274
- ISBN: 978-1-955992-05-3

Love the World or Get Killed Trying is the 2024 English-language debut work of Swedish-American writer Alvina Chamberland. It is an autofictional novel about a trans woman's solo travel in Iceland, Paris, and Berlin when she is about to turn 30.

== Premise ==
In the work, Alvina is a performance artist about to turn 30. After almost being raped, she decides to travel to Iceland in order to heal and work through her feelings of loneliness and otherness. She dreams of becoming a travelogue writer and documents melting glaciers and Reykjavik's Pride Parade. Returning home to Berlin, Alvina experiences further mistreatment, othering, isolation, and pain. She continues experiencing harassment as she visits Paris for her birthday.

== Creation ==
Love the World or Get Killed Trying was Chamberland's first English-language novel, with her two previous works written in Swedish. After moving from Sweden to New York and Berlin, she realized that English worked better for her fiction writing because it was her first language and more connected to her feelings. She also wanted her writing to reach a larger audience.

Chamberland said that she does not write regularly, only when she needs to process "something that feels deep, or beautiful, or terrible". For this book, she dwelt on structural issues that upset her, especially those that affected the love, acceptance, and support available to straight trans women. Chamberland attributed the book's dark humor to the shared sharp humor she felt with other trans women, which she explained as a common survival strategy for coping with the world's discrimination. She cited Violette Leduc, Clarice Lispector, and Ingeborg Bachmann as literary influences for the work. Other inspirations for her voice included Jamaica Kincaid, Arundhati Roy, Marguerite Duras, and Sylvia Plath.

Chamberland recounted that she wrote most of the book while she was early in her transition and felt she was not passing. She consistently was fetishized and harassed by men rather than experiencing respectful advances. She intended for the book's main focus to be universal themes like death, longing, love, and living fully. However, she also focused on the dynamics between straight men and trans women. Although she did not write the book with a target audience, she hoped it would connect with both groups. She used contrast between nature and city settings within the book to emphasize the difference in Alvina's experience based on the presence or absence of public sexual attention.

Chamberland posed semi-nude for the cover of the book, in an image taken by David Uzochukwu. She wanted the photo to be artistic, intellectual, and sexy, deciding that this balance would help market the book, celebrate her freedom, hopefully let her remain perceivable as a serious writer, and challenge societal prejudices against trans women.

== Reception ==
Love the World or Get Killed Trying was a finalist for the 2025 Lambda Literary Award for Transgender Fiction.

Publishers Weekly commended the book's dark humor while recounting experiences of hypersexualization and harassment, concluding that the novel "thrums with life." Shze-Hui Tjoa praised the novel for its personal exploration of a trans woman's struggle to remain hopeful in a discriminatory world, calling it a "glorious, soul-shaking, vibrant manifesto". Veronica Esposito, reviewing for Xtra Magazine, praised the book's morbid comedy, prose quality, and characterization of shared trans experiences. However, Esposito questioned if the book became too bleak for readers by dwelling extensively on the hardships faced by Alvina. Drew Burnett Gregory, reviewing for Autostraddle, felt opposingly that it was "thrilling to read a work that captures both the weight and the mundanity" of constant harassment, and praised the book for its insight into the loneliness arising from Alvina's romantic othering.
