= I Don't Want to Be Understood =

2024 poetry collection by Joshua Jennifer Espinoza

- Cover of first edition
- Author: Joshua Jennifer Espinoza
- Language: English
- Genre: Poetry
- Publisher: Alice James Books
- Publication date: August 6, 2024
- Publication place: United States
- Pages: 100
- ISBN: 978-1-949944-63-1

I Don't Want to Be Understood is a 2024 poetry collection by Joshua Jennifer Espinoza. It was a finalist for the 2026 Kingsley Tufts Poetry Award, the 2025 Leslie Feinberg Award, and the 2025 Lambda Literary Award for Transgender Poetry.

== Contents ==
The book has two parts: "VIOLENCE IS THE SCROLL UPON WHICH HER HISTORY IS RECORDED" and "AND THEN CAME THE NAMING". Espinoza considers it to be a verse memoir covering her childhood and young adulthood.

"Airport Ritual" is the book's first poem, and three poems address travel through TSA checkpoints. Two poems are titled "A Confession". "It Doesn't Matter if I'm Understood" reprises the title of the collection.

== Analysis ==
Drew Burnett Gregory, writing for Autostraddle, deems the collection's poems more experimental than in Espinoza's prior work. Poems concern real memories, often about Espinoza's youth, transition, and father, but the same experiences are sometimes addressed in multiple poems, and memories are not always literal or realistic. Oscar Ivins, reviewing for Rain Taxi, finds that Espinoza uses absurdism and literalness to upend societal narratives about the reality and fantasy of transgender topics and people. Elliott Sky Case claims this contrast is a key part of the first section, with the second section focusing on the power and consequences of the act of naming.

Leonora Simonovis, for Poetry, notes that the collection is written from the perspective of a trans speaker working through tough memories and emotions in the face of transphobic experiences. The speaker writes beauty into these memories, while addressing her past self and working out how to live a free and full life. Simonovis and Rhiannon Thorne note that the speaker is processing conflicting emotions about these memories, alternating between self-acceptance and blame. Ivins reads pain and trauma as key themes throughout the work and the experiences it describes, with poems addressing how transition can be both empowering and traumatizing. Thorne notes that celebration is also sometimes present in the works. She claims that the collection avoids explaining and defending itself, choices that reflect the work's title.

== Reception ==
I Don't Want to Be Understood is a finalist for the 2026 Kingsley Tufts Poetry Award. It was a finalist for the 2025 Lambda Literary Award for Transgender Poetry. The work was also a finalist for the 2025 Leslie Feinberg Award for Trans and Gender-Variant Literature. It was shortlisted with distinction for Best Transfeminine Poetry in The Transfeminine Review's 2024 Reader's Choice Awards.

The collection was reviewed positively by Publishers Weekly, which noted its power to describe harsh and joyful experiences, naming the work sometimes devastating but also expressing "an exhilarating defiance". Drew Burnett Gregory, for Autostraddle, loved the collection's experimentation and departure from Espinoza's earlier work. Gregory felt Espinoza's voice remained similar, both powerful and witty, and named the first "A Confession" poem as her favorite in the work. Oscar Ivins applauded the work's detailed portrayal of the experience of transition and the contrasting emotions and experiences that come with it. Rhiannon Thorne, for Up the Staircase Quarterly, recommended the work as an example of trans poetics and wide-ranging confessional and lyric poetry. Thorne cited "It Doesn't Matter if I'm Understood" as one of her favorite poems in the work.
