= Red Colored Elegy =

1970 manga by Seiichi Hayashi

- First English edition of Red Colored Elegy as published by Drawn & Quarterly

赤色エレジー (Sekishoku Erejii)
- Genre: Romance
- Manga
- Written by: Seiichi Hayashi
- Published by: Shogakukan
- English publisher: NA: Drawn & Quarterly
- Magazine: Garo
- Published: 1970–1971
- Volumes: 1
- Original video animation
- Directed by: Seiichi Hayashi
- Music by: Keiichi Suzuki
- Studio: Toei Animation
- Released: June 21, 2007

Red Colored Elegy (Japanese: 赤色エレジー, Hepburn: Sekishoku Erejii) is a Japanese manga series written and illustrated by Seiichi Hayashi. The manga was serialized in manga magazine, Garo from 1970 to 1971. It is licensed in North America by Drawn & Quarterly, which released the manga on July 8, 2008. It was adapted into an original video animation by Toei Animation on June 21, 2007.

== Media ==
=== Manga ===
Red Colored Elegy is written and illustrated by Seiichi Hayashi. The manga was serialized in manga magazine, Garo from 1970 to 1971. Shogakukan published the manga in 1970/1971. It was republished on July 15, 2000. The manga is licensed in North America by Drawn & Quarterly, which released the manga on July 8, 2008.

=== Music ===
An eponymous single, performed by Morio Agata, was released on April 25, 1972, and peak ranked 7th in Oricon singles charts with more than 290,000 copies sold.

=== OVA ===
An original video animation was created for Red Colored Elegy by Toei Animation on June 21, 2007. The OVA was directed by Seiichi Hayashi and its music was directed by Morio Agata. Music was composed by Keiichi Suzuki and Agata's single for the OVA was played by Matiko Hamada.

== Reception ==
In a 2008 About.com poll, Red Colored Elegy was voted Best "Artsy/Quirky", and 7th best new classic or reissued manga. Publishers Weekly named Red Colored Elegy as the third best manga of 2008. In 2009, the manga was nominated for the Harvey Award in the Best American Edition of Foreign Material category. Red Colored Elegy was selected as part of Paul Gravett's list of "PG Rated Manga".

=== Reviews ===
The Comics Reporter's David Welsh commends the manga artist's approach to the story, saying "Hayashi's approach is very restrained and conscientious, particularly in its ability to convey the unspoken. Since communication is the crux of Ichiro and Sachiko's problems, the ability to convey the inability to express is essential." Another The Comics Reporter review comments on how "very simple cartooning can be taken in bold new directions through something other than a prodigious display of old-school craft." The Japan Times's David Cozy commends Hayashi's art, commenting "Hayashi shows us Ichiro struggling, but it is the spatters that bring the struggle home."

The comics artist and cartoonist Eddie Campbell described it as a good read, "a long strip cartoon about the stuff of life" and back to 1971 context would have been an inspirational work. He also replied to a reviewer complaining not able to make sense of it by linking the Red Colored Elegy and the '60s French New Wave cinema movement and describing today's reader as accustomed to linear read, concluding by if readers are occasionally confused then "welcome to 1970". Chris Lanier expressed a similar view in the January 2009 issue of The Believer describing Hayashi's work as an attempt to import "the disjunctive innovations of French new-wave cinema to the comics page" resulting "a condensed visual poetry that still feels avant-garde nearly forty years later". Red Colored Elegy was reviewed in issue #292 of The Comics Journal by Bill Randall, who provided additional notes on his blog and expressed his disappointment towards the online reviews of what he considers as "one of the most important of all manga translated in English". Adam Stephanides, another contributor to The Comics Journal, wrote an earlier review of the Japanese edition describing the storytelling as apparently simple at first but actually quite complex and elliptical, with a great deal left unsaid. Stephanides compared it to the works of artist Jaime Hernandez, as well as the outputs of '70s American underground comix artists, stating that no underground artist was doing anything nearly as ambitious as this at the time.

Stephanides criticized Drawn & Quarterly's edition for "rearranging the panels on each page so that the page (and the book) reads left-to-right, but not flipping the original panels." Tom Devlin, creative director at Drawn & Quarterly, answered that it was done so to reach the widest audience as possible. Devlin described a parallel between this choice and putting subtitles on a foreign film, saying that both clearly alter the work and yet are the only way for many to access it.

Jason Thompson's appendix to Manga: The Complete Guide compares Red Colored Elegy with Craig Thompson's Blankets through the shared theme of "a tale of young love and despair". He also commends "Hayashi's almost shapeless human figures convey emotion and vulnerability in every line".

=== Influence ===
Nino Bulling cited Red Colored Elegy's dialogue-driven narrative as a major influence on the development of their 2022 graphic novel, Firebugs.

=== Animation reception ===
Red Colored Elegy OVA was recommended by the jury at the 2007 Japan Media Arts Festival in the animation division.
