= WFPC-LP =

Radio station at Franklin Pierce University

Coordinates: 42.781°N 72.057°W

- Rindge, New Hampshire; United States
- Frequency: 105.3 MHz
- Branding: The Talon

Programming
- Format: College radio

Ownership
- Owner: Franklin Pierce University

History
- First air date: June 23, 2003
- Call sign meaning: Franklin Pierce College

Technical information
- Class: L1
- ERP: 100 watts
- HAAT: 18 meters (59 ft)

WFPC-LP (105.3 FM) is a radio station licensed by the Federal Communications Commission (FCC) to Franklin Pierce University. The station makes its home inside the Marlin Fitzwater Center for Communication in Rindge, New Hampshire. This is a low power radio station run by students. WFPC-LP is a member of the Pierce Media Group.

== PMG News Center ==
WFPC-LP is a station that features news every hour provided in part by the Associated Press and the PMG News Center.

== Fitzwater Center's Presidency and the Press ==
WFPC-LP is involved with the Presidency and the Press workshop held annually during the summer on Franklin Pierce University's Rindge campus.

== Pierce Media Group ==
The Pierce Media Group, run by students, is made up of the Pierce Arrow, FPC TV 25 the local public-access television channel and Four Corners Marketing.

== Marlin Fitzwater Center for Communication Tuesday Briefing Series ==
Tuesday Briefings have invited government, civic and business leaders to Rindge New Hampshire to meet with students and answer questions. Guests have included Ann Compton from ABC News, Boston Globe New Hampshire Political correspondent James Pindell, Journalist and Author Linda Killian, former senior advisor to the Iraqi Ministry of Education and a member of the Franklin Pierce College Board of Trustees Leslye A. Arsht, Franklin Pierce and the Fitzwater Center hosted election 2006 New Hampshire senate rivals Paul Hodes and Charlie Bass, political activist Doris "Granny D" Haddock.

The Tuesday Briefings start at 11am EST.
