= Pearly Lake =

Lake in New Hampshire, United States

- Tarbell Pond
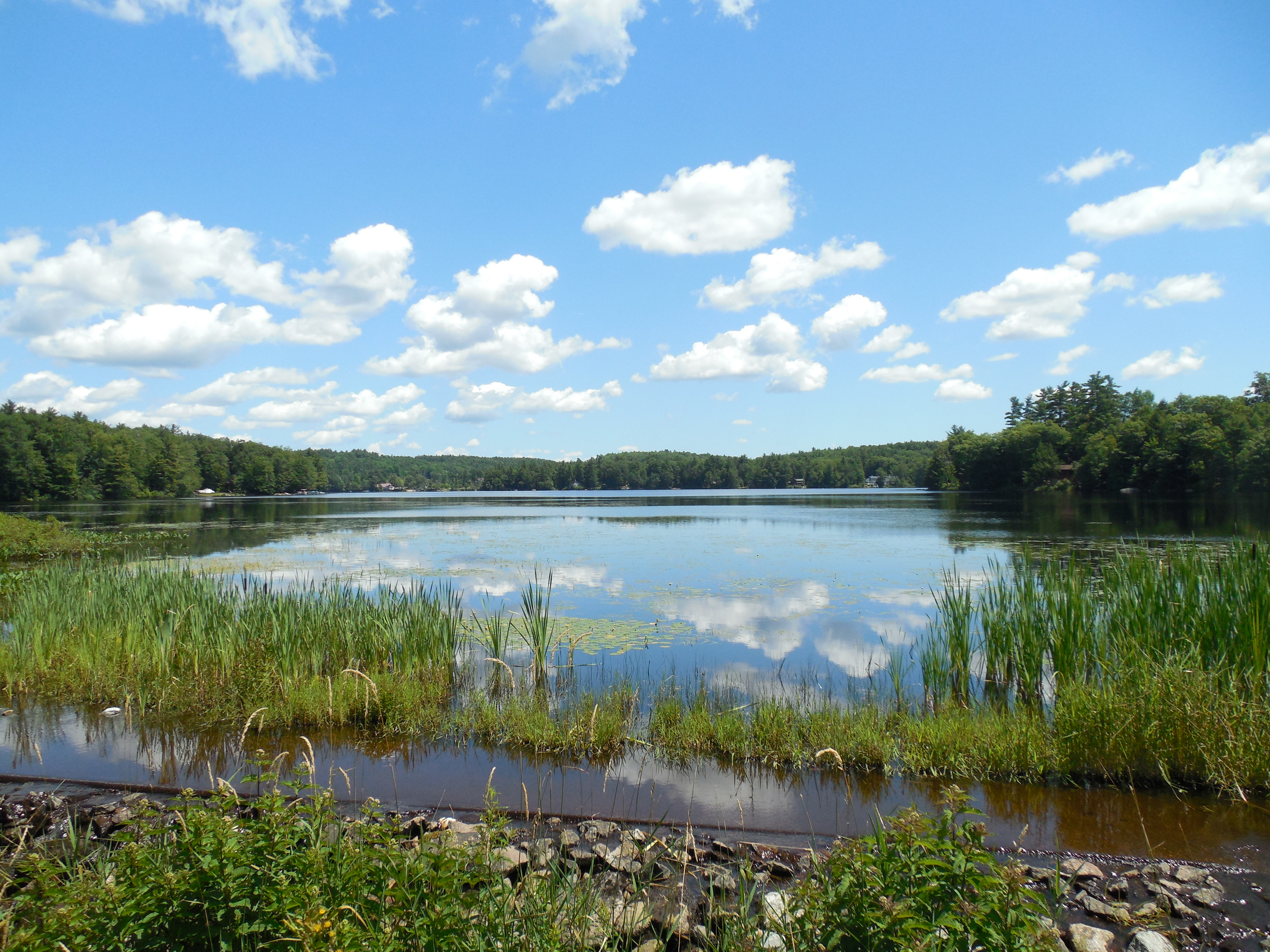

- Location within New Hampshire Location within the United States
- Location: Cheshire County, New Hampshire
- Coordinates: 42°46′31″N 72°3′37″W
- Primary outflows: Tarbell Brook
- Basin countries: United States
- Max. length: 1.4 mi (2.3 km)
- Max. width: 0.3 mi (0.48 km)
- Surface area: 191.5 acres (0.8 km^{2})
- Average depth: 7 ft (2.1 m)
- Max. depth: 17 ft (5.2 m)
- Surface elevation: 1,007 feet (307 m)
- Settlements: Rindge

Pearly Lake or Pearly Pond is a 192-acre (0.8 km^{2}) water body in the town of Rindge, in southwestern New Hampshire, United States. Formerly known as Tarbell Pond, named for Revolutionary War Minuteman Lieut. Samuel Tarbell who settled here, the lake is one of the headwaters of Tarbell Brook, a tributary of the Millers River, which flows southwest to the Connecticut River at Millers Falls, Massachusetts.

The undergraduate campus of Franklin Pierce University is located on the northeast shore of the lake.

The lake is classified as a warmwater fishery, with observed species including largemouth bass, chain pickerel, yellow perch, bluegill, horned pout, American eel, and green sunfish.

== See also ==
- List of lakes in New Hampshire
