= The Other Olympians =

2024 book by Michael Waters

- Author: Michael Waters
- Subject: Sports History, LGBTQ+ History, Gender Studies
- Publisher: Farrar, Straus and Giroux
- Publication date: June 4, 2024
- Pages: 368
- ISBN: 978-0-374-60981-8

The Other Olympians: Fascism, Queerness, and the Making of Modern Sports is a 2024 nonfiction book by Michael Waters. It documents the rise of sports sex testing during Nazi oversight of the 1936 Berlin Olympics. The book also recounts the experiences of prominent gender-nonconforming and transgender athletes in early 20th-century Europe, including Zdeněk Koubek and Mark Weston.

The Other Olympians won the 2025 Lambda Literary Award for LGBTQ+ Nonfiction.

== Contents ==
The Other Olympians, by Michael Waters, is written in four parts. The sections document the life of Zdeněk Koubek; the rise of Nazi and fascist ideas about sex and gender; the creation of sex verification testing for the 1936 Berlin Olympic Games; and the expansion of these tests, and corresponding gender anxieties and myths, throughout the Cold War.

=== Athletes and gender ===
The book begins by discussing the life of Koubek and his contemporaries in early 20th century European athletics. Koubek was a Czechoslovak runner who was assigned female at birth but grappled with his gender identity while growing up. He hated sports as a child, but after finding a feeling of freedom during running events at a track and field competition, he began to compete regularly. During this time, many athletic competitions like the Olympic Games banned women from participating. In response, Alice Milliat founded the Women's World Games after creating France's first women's sports league. The Olympics began to absorb the Women's World Games in the 1920s, and their rule-setting division, the International Amateur Athletic Federation (IAAF), began to debate whether sports like track and field should be dropped for women. The IAAF argued that some sports were a hazard for women's health because they were too masculine.

European women's leagues expanded with time, and they attracted some queer athletes who had been assigned female at birth but were questioning their gender identity or did not conform to gender expectations of the time. Koubek competed until winning gold at the 1934 Women's World Games. Press coverage of the event included some disparaging comments about Koubek's masculine gender expression, amidst broader cultural debates over whether women's leagues for sports like track and field would create a new category of sex. This was part of larger cultural conversations about the fluidity of current definitions of sex and gender: doctors in the early 20th century had begun to publish articles and speak to the press about their findings that human biology did not support a binary definition of sex. Although press coverage of women's sports leagues sometimes included complaints that certain athletes looked or behaved too masculinely to be fair competitors, the leagues themselves did not surveil the genders of their athletes.

Koubek had already questioned his gender, and soon decided to retire and transition. He privately sought gender-affirming care, but was open about his experiences and began to participate in men's league club sports. His transition was covered in the press with curiosity and some mild support, and Waters argues that this response was likely aided by Koubek's class and race, as well as the fact that he was transitioning to male and aligning with heterosexual norms. His story inspired other prominent athletes like Mark Weston and Willy de Bruyn to transition as well. Koubek and Weston's celebrity grew as they transitioned, and both were the subject of global news. As more athletes transitioned, press coverage became more sensationalized, and it especially provoked the gender anxieties of the International Olympic Committee and Nazi Party. The Nazi Party deemed queer people to be "asocial", and had attacked Germany's queer community throughout the 1930s, increasingly arresting and killing its members. Nazi propaganda vilified any prominent European athletes who transitioned.

=== 1936 Berlin Olympics ===
The 1936 Olympics were scheduled to be held in Berlin, and by 1932, the Nazi Party took control of the German Olympic Committee. They started demanding that competitive sports exclude Jewish people, racial minorities, and gender minorities. Nazi doctor Wilhelm Knoll advocated for beginning sex verification testing for women's sports competitions, asking the IAAF to require that a doctor be appointed to check the gender of every competitor in women's events before they could compete in the Olympics. Avery Brundage and Sigfrid Edström, powerful members of international sports federations at the time, backed the plan. They took advantage of intense media speculation over the participation of Helen Stephens in the 1936 Olympics to institute the change. Stephens was a cisgender American runner and a tall lesbian, and she was subjected to repeated public accusations of being a man in disguise.

The Olympic Games began the mandatory physical examinations in 1936, although they did not have clear guidelines for what the tests would measure or who they were meant to exclude. They did not specify whether male imposters, intersex athletes, or masculine-presenting athletes were the proposed targets of these surveillance measures, instead reacting to the news stories leading up to the 1936 Olympics. The queer men who had transitioned after winning previous athletics competitions, especially Koubek, Weston, and Heinz Ratjen, had all left women's sports after their transitions and did not want to compete in women's divisions.

=== Expansion of gender verification tests ===
The expansion of gender verification tests for women's sports divisions continued throughout future international events, with track and field events attracting more gender anxiety than most other sports. Waters notes that these sports also attracted the most working-class athletes and athletes of color, and they received the most gender scrutiny because sports regulators perceived them as less feminine than competitors of advantaged classes in other sports. The Olympic Games officially began gender verification testing for women's competitions for the 1948 London Olympics, and proceeded to codify their definition of sex for the tests. The tests expanded in part, Waters argues, because of the growing myth that sports caused women to become more masculine or even caused them to transition. This myth was rooted in earlier media anxieties around Weston and Koubek's transitions and the perceived masculinity of certain sports. By this time, Weston and Koubek lived private lives and were accepted as men by their communities. Koubek played men's rugby and died in 1986.

By the 1960s, the fascist motivations for Olympic sex verification tests were not discussed. The tests were instead justified as methods of maintaining fairness for women competing in sports. Fairness became an especially political issue due to the Cold War, when international sports were used as a political venue by opposed powers. Mandatory in-person physical examinations began, with athletes like Tamara and Irina Press receiving scrutiny due to their body types. By the 1990s, genetic testing replaced physical examinations, with hormone testing following later. Via each implementation, the regulations variously blocked people from competing based on body type, chromosomal variation, or hormone levels. Waters argues that today, sex verification testing is seen as just as natural as the division of sports into separated events for men or women.

== Background ==
Michael Waters began writing The Other Olympians in 2021. Previously, he was researching an article for Slate about Barbara Ann Richards, a Californian trans woman who applied to legally change her name in 1941. Some news coverage about Richards's application compared her gender transition to those undergone by athletes like Zdeněk Koubek and Mark Weston. This guided Waters to Koubek's 1936 memoir, which inspired Waters to write a book about gender and athletics centered on Koubek.

While writing The Other Olympians, Waters followed guidelines created by the Trans Journalists Association. Waters does not label Koubek as trans or intersex in the book, because the labels evolved later and Koubek did not refer to himself with them. Waters used he/him pronouns throughout for Koubek, in contrast with Koubek's memoir, which uses she/her pronouns in pre-transition narratives.

== Publication ==
The Other Olympians was published by Farrar, Straus and Giroux on June 4, 2024. It is Waters's first book.

== Reception ==
The Other Olympians won the 2025 Lambda Literary Award for LGBTQ+ Nonfiction. It was a finalist for the 2025 Mark Lynton History Prize.

Publishers Weekly gave The Other Olympians a starred review, commending the book's findings and quality of storytelling. The review concluded it is "an eye-opening look at how fascist philosophy undergirds gender regulatory regimes in sports". Stef Rubino called the book essential reading for the 2024 Olympics in an Autostraddle article, similarly praising the book's research quality, engaging prose, and insights for the present. Noelle McManus, in a review for Liber, also praised the book's information and manner of sharing it. McManus named the work a "welcome and necessary addition to the queer canon" as well as an important text for contemporary debates around gender. Anne Bartlett, in a starred review for Bookpage, noted the book's careful reporting of the 1930s origins of professional athletics rules about gender and sex. Kirkus Reviews noted similar characteristics: "Densely factual, impeccably researched, and written with dramatic flair, this book intensively probes gender bias in the Olympics amid the rise of European midcentury fascism and the epic challenges to gender essentialism". Bartlett and McManus also noted the book's persuasive angle, reporting that Waters's explicitly argues for changing the rules he documents. Terri Schlichenmeyer, reviewing for the Washington Blade, found the book to be dense but rewarding for committed readers.

Lindsay Parks Pieper recommended The Other Olympians in a review in the Journal of Sport History. Pieper named it an essential addition to contemporary understandings of gender and sports regulations, writing that it presents a well-researched demonstration of the "clear connection between fascist ideology and sex testing". Zachary R. Bigalke, the book review editor of Sport History Review, also praised the importance and contemporary value of The Other Olympians. Bigalke introduced a series of reviews of the book in that journal by several scholars who had previously held a panel discussion with Waters on queering sports history.
