= Cathedral of the Pines =

Outdoor multi-denominational religious complex

Coordinates: 42.7747°N 71.9884°W

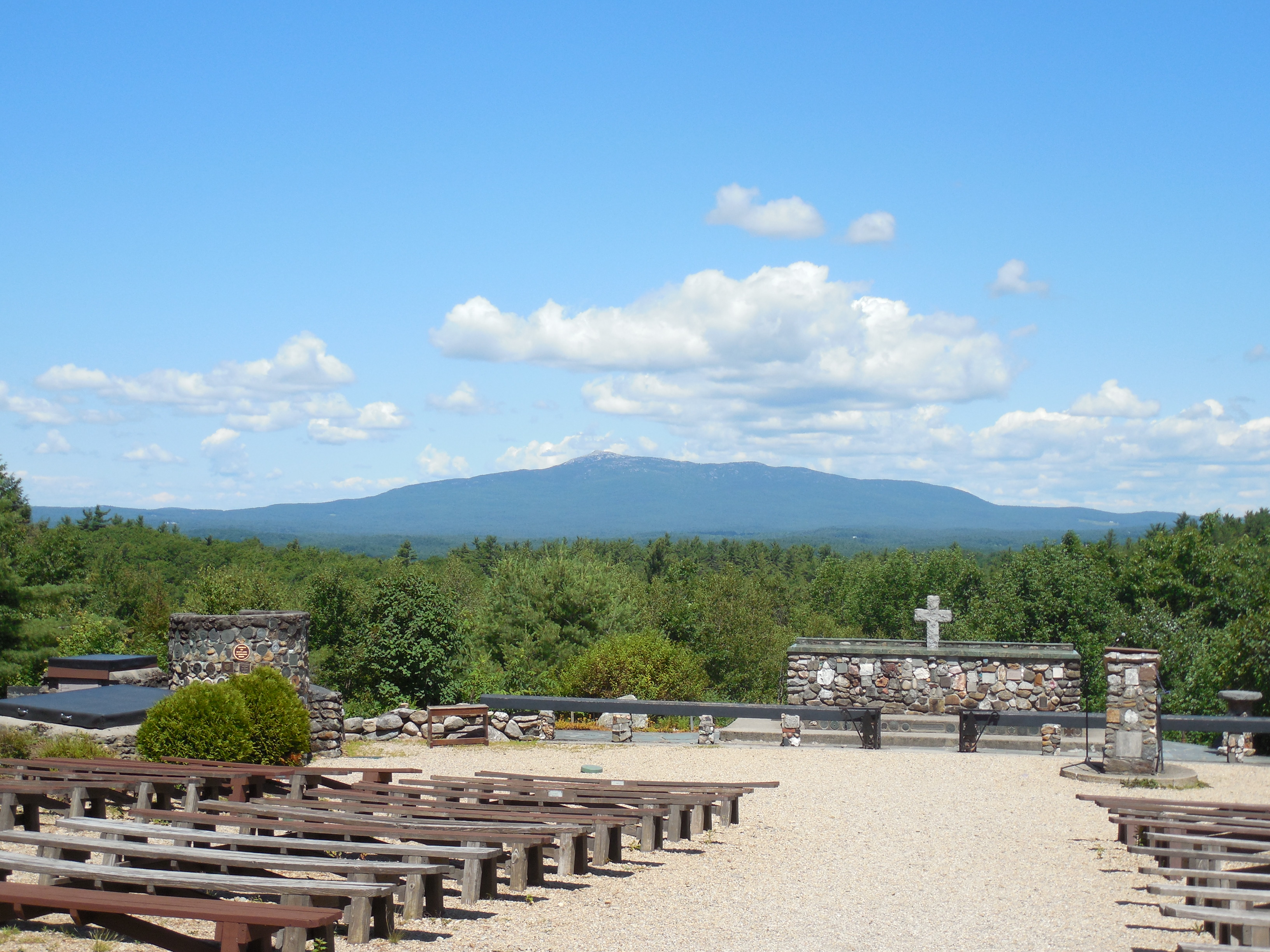
- View of Mount Monadnock from Cathedral of the Pines
- Interactive map of Cathedral of the Pines

Details
- Established: 1937
- Location: Rindge, New Hampshire
- Style: Open-air complex
- Size: 128 acres (52 ha)
- Website: cathedralofthepines.org

Cathedral of the Pines is an open-air complex in Rindge, New Hampshire, that was built as a memorial to the American war dead. It incorporates a multi-denominational sanctuary, other sacred spaces, and a number of burial grounds. The Cathedral, which commands a scenic view of forested land and Mount Monadnock, is run as a nonprofit corporation.

== History ==
In 1937, Douglas Sloane III and his wife Sibyl purchased a 128-acre (52 ha) property about 2 miles (3 km) northeast of the center of Rindge. Their intention was that their four children would later build houses on separate lots within the property. The following year, a destructive hurricane hit the region, and the five-acre lot selected for the second son, Sanderson (Sandy), was badly damaged. It was situated on a knoll and when the family went to assess the damage, they saw that the fallen trees had revealed a spectacular view across the forests towards Mount Monadnock to the northwest, with other mountains visible beyond. The view remains unspoiled to this day.

Sandy, who joined the United States Army Air Forces, was killed in action in 1944, leaving a wife and newborn son (who would survive less than three years). In August 1945, the family used the clearing that would have been his home for a memorial service that was attended by people around the community. Building on that event, the Sloanes developed the Cathedral of the Pines as a memorial for those fallen in service to the nation, and as a monument to peace and understanding. They welcomed people of all faiths, and developed the site into a series of locations for outdoor chapels, cemeteries, and other monuments. It now encompasses 236 acres (96 ha).

Cathedral of the Pines is a nonprofit corporation that accepts on-site donations and is supported by veterans organizations and other service organizations including the Daughters of the American Revolution and the Daughters of Colonial Wars.

== Features ==
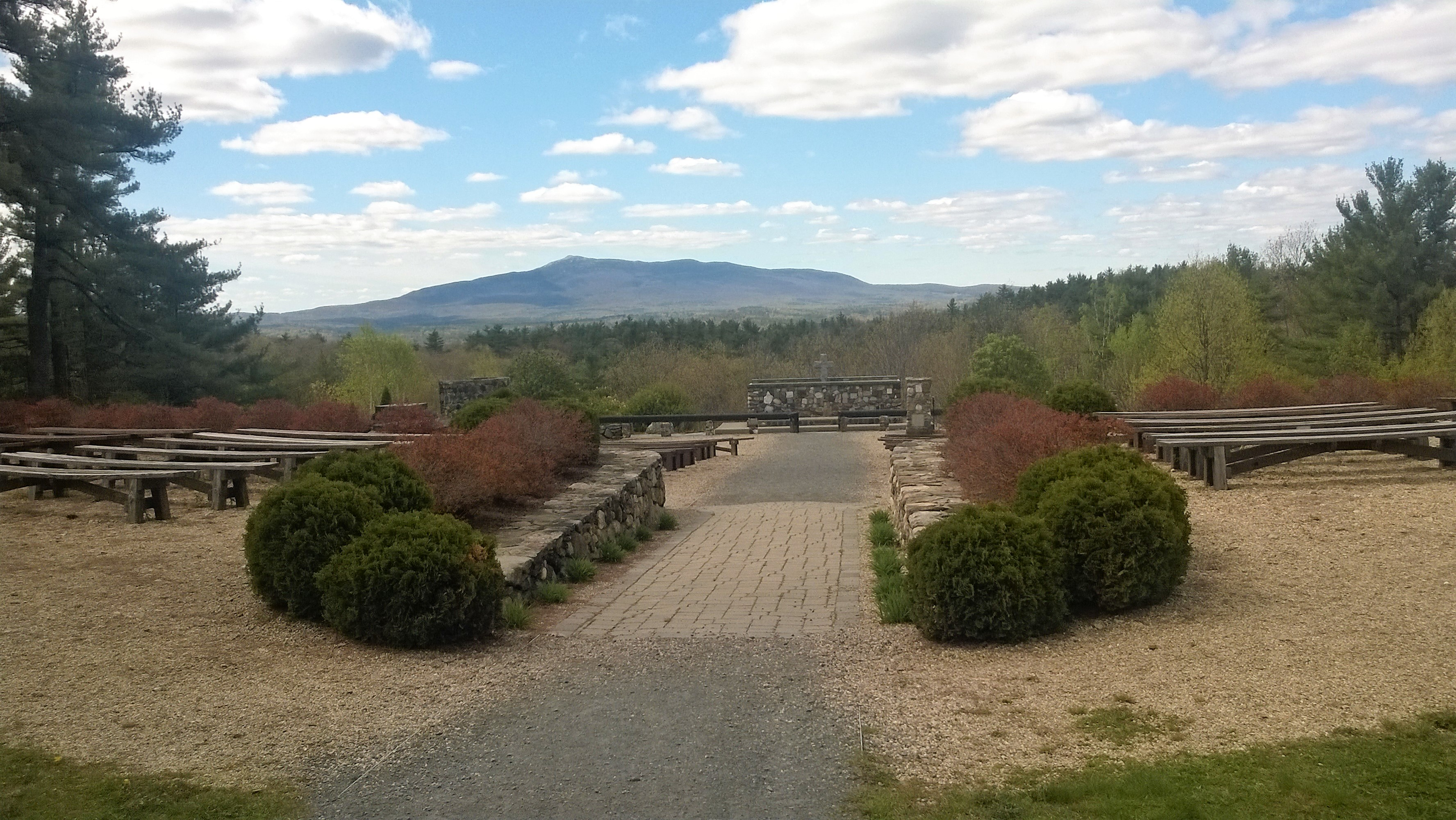
View from the main sanctuary, looking at Mount Monadnock

Most of the features of the site are built of stone (principally granite), with the exception of some wooden benches. Many bronze panels are inset into the stone, commemorating individual deceased servicemen and servicewomen, and acknowledging sponsoring organizations.

At the entrance to the complex are the Mother's Chapel and the Women's Memorial Bell Tower. A short walk leads to the main sanctuary. This includes the Altar of the Nations, which incorporates stones from every U.S. state and from several battlefields. The Altar has the most compelling view of Monadnock and has been designated as a national memorial to American war dead. The pews, lectern, pulpit, and stoup are also made entirely of stone.

A winding path leads to cemetery plots, additional open-air chapels (including a sparse "Zen chapel"), a garden, and standing stones that carry carved inscriptions from the Bible and other spiritual texts. Some of the inscriptions are in Hebrew. Several longer trails lead through the woods and to the nearby Grassy Pond and Emerson Pond.

The Peter J. Booras Museum holds service-related memorabilia. After a renovation, it was re-opened on 20 May 2017.

== Uses ==
Cathedral of the Pines hosts weddings and marriage renewal ceremonies. It offers memorial services and burials, as well as personalized memorial benches, placards, and carved granite walls. The current organization describes the Sloanes' dream as a "cathedral without borders", and claims to have hosted events for 75 different faiths.

The New Hampshire Society of the Daughters of the American Revolution host an annual event in August at the cathedral.

Individuals can usually freely visit the grounds between May and October; private events, tours, and picnics are also available.
