= Trans Femme Futures: Abolitionist Ethics for Transfeminist Worlds =

2024 book by Nat Raha and Mijke van der Drift

- Cover of the 2024 Pluto Books edition
- Author: Nat Raha, Mijke van der Drift
- Publisher: Pluto Press
- Publication date: November 20, 2024
- Pages: 256
- ISBN: 978-0-745-34940-4

Trans Femme Futures: Abolitionist Ethics for Transfeminist Worlds is a non-fiction book by Nat Raha and Mijke van der Drift, published in 2024 by Pluto Press. It was a finalist for the 2025 Lambda Literary Award for Transgender Nonfiction.

== Background ==
Nat Raha and Mijke van der Drift co-edit the zine Radical Transfeminism, and both are scholars and artists. Raha and van der Drift have activist backgrounds, and wrote this book while transphobia and anti-trans legislation were on the rise around the world.

== Contents ==
In the book's introduction, the authors note that they want Trans Femme Futures to change the conversation on trans, feminist, and anti-racist organising and philosophy. Rather than focusing on identity politics, the authors want these movements to focus on the power and reasoning behind collective actions that transform current realities.

Raha and van der Drift write about complicity: the idea that people in a movement for liberating some may be cooperating with systems that harm others. The authors decide that successful organising entails recognising and not hiding from one's own complicity: everyone is already complicit in something, and the ideal of staying innocent from harm means that someone is also not doing the work to fix other harms. The authors similarly call out the distinction between morality and ethics, saying that morality requires following an institution's ideals, sticking to an imagined virtuous path, while ethics shapes the way people act in the world.

The authors also define a framework of care, and how people take care of one another now and could in the future. They talk about the importance of caring for each other's survival and eventual thriving, and they discuss the ways that care and servitude have traditionally intersected along lines of gender and class, but explain why care is an important practice to maintain in spite of its history. They also contrast care with neglect, and talk about the oppression that a lack of care can cause for people. Personal acts of care and institutional practices of care are both cast as important needs for liberation, but when institutional care is lacking, they offer histories of communal care that people create outside of powerful institutions that have helped maintain and support trans communities.

The philosophies presented in the book contrast with what the authors call today's trans liberalism. The authors portray much of today's liberal trans organising as following a pattern of asking, then demanding, trans rights. This does not achieve liberation when it leaves the balance of power too far shifted towards powerful neoliberal institutions, the authors argue. Instead, the authors want organising to focus on different forms of collective, transformative action. The authors propose that organisers learn from transfeminist practice to build cultures of generosity and inclusion where everyone can help liberate each other. They emphasise using acts of care, mutual aid, and giving outside of our current institutions to achieve this.

== Publication ==
Trans Femme Futures: Abolitionist Ethics for Transfeminist Worlds was published on November 20, 2024 by Pluto Press.

== Analysis ==
Clare Hemmings, a professor of feminist theory at the London School of Economics, notes the book's engagement with intersectional lines of work and scholars who stand apart from the current academic canon. Some of the theorists that the book refers to include Travis Alabanza, Françoise Vergès, and Juana Rodriguez. Scholar Allison Quinlan describes the book's philosophy for achieving liberation as an abolitionist, grassroots approach based on collective solidarity.

== Reception ==
Trans Femme Futures was a finalist for the 2025 Lambda Literary Award for Transgender Nonfiction.

Rebecca Brody, for Library Journal, found that the book carried a powerful message for people interested in queer liberation or transfeminism. Brody noted the book's language was sometimes complicated for readers new to the area. Professor Clare Hemmings praised the book's academic arguments and vision for the London School of Economics Review of Books. Professor Katharina Hunfeld reviewed the book alongside Enemy Feminisms, by Sophie Lewis, stating that both books provide essential strategic visions for how feminists can work towards liberation beyond what current capitalist, cisgender institutions push movements towards. In Matthew J. Cull's article "A Plea for Pluralism", he praised the book alongside Beyond Personhood: An Essay in Trans Philosophy by Talia Mae Bettcher and Rach Cosker-Rowland's Gender Identity: What it is and Why It Matters as examples of excellent and diverse approaches to contemporary trans philosophy.
