= Seiichi Hayashi =

Japanese manga artist

- 林静一
- Born: March 7, 1945 (age 81); Mukden, Manchukuo
- Occupations: Manga artist, animator, illustrator
- Years active: 1962–present
- Known for: Red Colored Elegy

Seiichi Hayashi (Japanese: 林静一, Hepburn: Hayashi Seiichi; born 7 March 1945) is a Japanese manga artist, animator and illustrator.

== Life and career ==
Hayashi was born in Mukden, Manchuria in Japanese-occupied Manchuria.

Hayashi attended a design school in Yoyogi, where he learned creating work reminiscent of International Typographic Style. He started his career in 1962 in animation by working for Toei Animation. He was involved in founding the animation studio Knack Productions in 1967.

From 1967 on, he published manga in the alternative manga magazine Garo, which stayed his main outlet for publishing manga. His breakthrough came in 1970 with the manga Red Colored Elegy about the break-up of an unmarried couple. The singer Morio Agata named a popular song of his after the manga.

Hayashi became an important figure in the 1960s and 1970s avant-garde arts scene of Tokyo. He is cited with bringing pop art into manga. Apart from manga, he is also known as a designer and illustrator. He designed and illustrated the cover of Happy End's 1970 self-titled debut album. Hayashi designed the packaging of the candy drops Lotte Koume, which came on the market in 1974.

== Style and themes ==
He is famous for depicting women in a style similar to Yumeji Takehisa. Film director Seijun Suzuki was a major inspiration for his work.

Hayashi often explored the psychological aftermath of World War II and the effects of Americanization and economic growth on Japanese identity. His 1968 story Red Dragonfly (Akatonbo) portrays a child's bleak home life under postwar conditions, combining modernist aesthetics with cultural references from the Taisho era. Hayashi's manga often recontextualized prewar and early 20th-century imagery to critique contemporary Japanese society and evoke a sense of nostalgic loss.

== Legacy ==
Hayao Miyazaki names Hayashi as an influence on his work.

== Works ==
- Red Colored Elegy (赤色エレジー, Sekishoku Erejii, 1970–1971)
- Red Red Rock and Other Stories
- Gold Pollen and Other Stories
