= Morio Agata =

Japanese singer, songwriter, and actor (born 1948)

Morio Agata あがた森魚
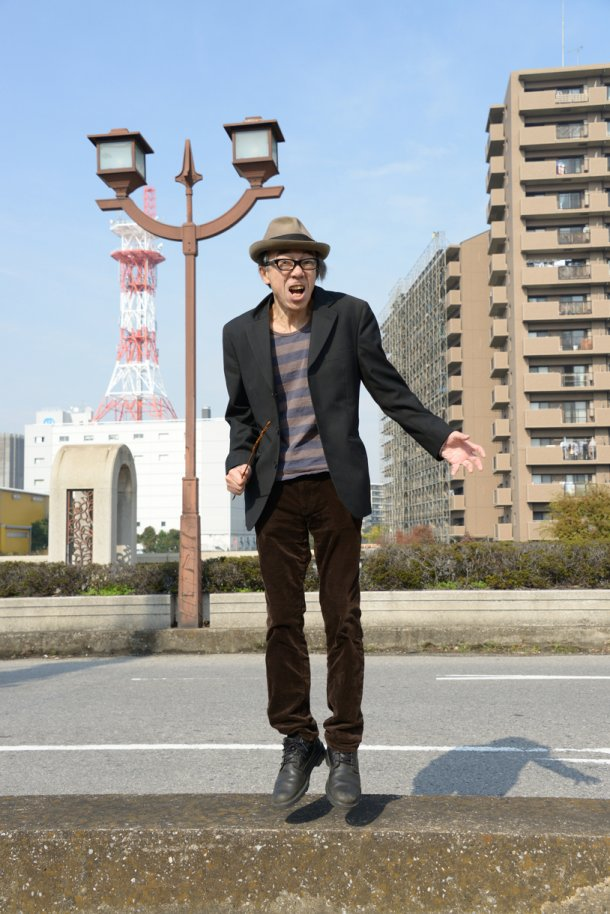
- Morio in 2012, at Kawaguchi-Hongou

Background information
- Born: Morio Yamagata; 12 September 1948 (age 77); Rumoi, Hokkaido, Japan
- Genres: Fork, Rock
- Occupations: singer-songwriter, actor, film director
- Instruments: Guitar, Vocal
- Years active: 1970–present

Agata Morio (Japanese: あがた森魚, born 12 September 1948) is a Japanese folk rock singer-songwriter and actor. He also directed three films.

== Biography ==
Agata was born in Rumoi, Hokkaido.

His 1972 debut single Sekishoku Erejī (literary translated as Red Elegy) sold more than a half million copies and still remains his biggest hit. The title of the song was named after the manga series Red Colored Elegy by Seiichi Hayashi.

== Discography ==
=== Singles ===
(Selected)

- Sekishoku Erejī (25 April 1972)
- Jurietta no Natsu (21 June 1987)
- Sairento Ibu (5 October 1993)
- Kitto Kitto !! Tōku Tōku !! (15 March 1995)
- Torikago no Machi (25 February 1996)

=== Albums ===
- Chikuonban (1970)
- Otome no Roman (1972)
- Aa Mujo (1974)
- Boku wa Tenshi ja Naiyo (1975, a soundtrack album, collaboration with Eiichi Otaki)
- Nippon Shōnen (Jipangu Boy) (1976)
- Kimi no koto Sukinanda (1977)
- Norimono Zukan (1980)
- Eien no Engoku (1985)
- Eien no Engoku no Uta (1986)
- Bando Neon no Jagā (1987)
- Bando Neon no Jagā to Aoneko (1987)
- Mikkīo no Densetsu (1988)
- Puranettsu Ābento (1990, live)
- Imitation Gold (5 November 1993)
- Pirosumania Umi e Iku (26 January 1994)
- Ōtobai Shōjo (1 August 1994, a soundtrack album)
- 24ji no Wakusei (26 July 1995)
- Dai-nana Tōei Awa (25 March 1996)
- Agata Morio no Rajio Shō (1996, live)
- Minato no Rokisī (22 October 1999, a soundtrack album)
- Nihon Shōnen 2000kei (12 January 1999)
- Satou Keiko Sensei wa Zankokuna Hito desukedo (21 November 2001)
- Gineoberude (Aoi Banana) (2004)
- Tarphology (20 September 2007)
- Yuya Uchida I do not know is the sunset glow of the universe I know (14 February 2011)
- Everyone loves Erika (21 September 2011)
- Codomo album (30 November 2012 · Agata Morio and Yuko Yamasaki in name)
- Pavement with a woman and a man (9 May 2012) * Cover collection of movie music
- COBALT TARUPHONIC Music Bunches 1 – 3 (9 May 2012)
- Chicken childhood (20 December 2012 )
- Supaka Tamagu (LP 24 December 2013, CD 10 March 2014)
- Urashima 64 (15 November 2014 LP, CD 3 December)
- Urashima 65 BC (20 July 2015)
- Urashima 65 XX (30 November 2015)
- Modern lock (18 November 2016)
- Beibyilon (BABY-LON) (26 April 2017) * Agata Morio and Hachimitsu-Pai
- Ideal Socks and Ships (26 December 2018)
- Sightseeing Souvenirs, from the Third Planet (18 December 2019)
- Urashima 2020 (12 December 2020)
- Urashima 2010s Selection (22 December 2021)
- Wonder Ruby 2021 (29 December 2021)
- Wonder Ruby 2022 (11 January 2023)
- Enshuunada 2023 (17 January 2024)
- Orion No Mori (6 November 2024)
- Otaru-Kun 2025 (26 December 2025)

== Filmography ==
This is the complete list of the films that Agata directed.

- Boku wa Tenshi ja Naiyo (1975)
- Ōtobai Shōjo (1994)
- Minato no Rokisī (1999)
- Hakodate Coffee (2016)

He was part of the cast of Biri Gal (2015).
