= The Pairing =

2024 novel by Casey McQuiston

- Author: Casey McQuiston
- Language: English
- Genre: Romance novel
- Publisher: St. Martin's Griffin
- Publication date: August 6, 2024
- Publication place: United States
- Pages: 432
- ISBN: 9781250862747

The Pairing is a 2024 romance novel by Casey McQuiston published by St. Martin's Griffin. The plot follows Theo and Kit, two bisexual exes who happen to be on the same food and wine tour across Europe. To deal with the awkwardness, they bet on who can sleep with the most people on the tour. Halfway through the novel, Theo comes out as non-binary, switching from she/her to they/them pronouns.
