= American Teenager (book) =

2024 book by Nico Lang

- Author: Nico Lang
- Language: English
- Genre: Non-fiction
- Publisher: Abrams Books
- Publication date: October 8, 2024
- Pages: 272
- ISBN: 978-1-419-77382-2

American Teenager: How Trans Kids Are Surviving Hate and Finding Joy in a Turbulent Era is a 2024 non-fiction book by American journalist Nico Lang that details the lives of eight trans teenagers. It was a finalist for the 2025 Lambda Literary Award for Transgender Nonfiction, as well as a 2025 Stonewall Honor Book in Non-Fiction.

== Overview ==
Nico Lang, a nonbinary journalist, interviewed eight trans American teenagers and their friends and families to create a book about their experiences and lives. Lang met with seven families and dedicates a chapter of American Teenager: How Trans Kids Are Surviving Hate and Finding Joy in a Turbulent Era to each. The book's foreword, by Susan Stryker, discusses recent anti-trans legislation across the U.S., as well as statistics about how these laws have affected trans Americans and their families.

American Teenagers follows teenagers of a range of ages, backgrounds, and gender identities who live in conservative areas in South Dakota, West Virginia, Alabama, Texas, and Florida, as well as liberal places in Illinois and California. All of their lives are affected by discrimination and anti-trans political shifts. Some teenagers and parents are engaged in political advocacy for trans people, while others try to avoid political engagement. The parents are supportive of their trans children in different ways and are informed about trans issues to different degrees. Some parents deeply researched trans topics after their children came out, and others struggled to use their children's preferred pronouns.

The teenagers' stories include worries over trying to get top surgery before attending prom, attending a queer summer camp, trying to leave home for more opportunity, and experiencing the loss of gender-affirming care after legislative changes. Many dealt with the challenges of having necessary health care, sometimes dealing with coverage issues and political oppression. They also recount experiences like college admissions and driving tests.

== Development ==
Lang described their goal with the work as documenting the experiences of trans teenagers to show that "trans kids are human, like everyone else. More specifically, they are just kids, and they share many of the same dreams and aspirations that other children do."

Lang wanted American Teenagers to represent a variety of personal and authentic stories that were relatable, prioritizing the teenagers' experiences, but exploring their parents' experiences as well. Lang tried to represent underreported and intersectional stories, providing the example of trans Asian-American and Pacific Islanders as a group that had received little media representation. They hoped that the book would build a connection between readers and its subjects, compelling readers to take action to support people and become politically active.

Lang conducted interviews with each family over two-week visits. They had already met many of these families during their reporting work, and took referrals to find more. They said that they chose to follow families who they quickly connected with because they wanted to be able to discuss complex experiences in a short interview timeframe. They compared these interviews to therapy sessions, saying that the families had deeply shared many experiences of trauma, as well as their personalities and interests.

Lang also wanted the book to include immersive details about each family's lives. Their writing inspirations for this work included John Steinbeck, David Sedaris, and Hoop Dreams. In addition to interviewing subjects, Lang spent time following family members to experience some of their routines.

It was emotionally taxing for Lang to gather the stories for the book. While interviewing the families, Lang repeatedly documented the effects of anti-trans legislation and the loss of civil rights for queer people. They described experiencing vicarious trauma that was heightened because their reporting was so extended with each family, resulting in a deeper connection to the pain each family experienced and recounted. They began attending a Buddhist temple on Sundays to help themselves heal.

Lang said that they felt it was very important to choose the right title, and especially wanted to avoid creating one from a trans-related pun, because they felt those were overused. After a month of searching, Lang was sitting in the car listening to the radio, and when Ethel Cain's song "American Teenager" started playing, Lang realized they wanted that song to be the namesake of the book.

== Reception ==
American Teenager became a 2025 Stonewall Honor Book in Non-Fiction. It was also a finalist for the 2025 Lambda Literary Award for Transgender Nonfiction.

Kirkus Reviews named the book as an important and compassionate telling of the experiences of trans teenagers. The Washington Blade's Terri Schlichenmeyer praised what she read as a deep and honest portrayal of the lives of trans teenagers, shown as normal and nuanced people living under stressful political issues. Alexis Burling, for the San Francisco Chronicle, named the book as a vital, powerful book for people with a range of knowledge on LGBTQIA+ issues. BookPage gave the book a starred review, with reviewer Deborah Mason praising Lang for writing sensitive and nuanced portrayals of each of their subjects. Casey Plett, reviewing for The Washington Post, called the book "a necessary work of patient, dogged, reportage" that succeeded in its message, but disliked the overuse of overoptimistic cliches in its prose and wanted the book to explore deeper questions.

The audiobook, narrated by Vico Ortiz, was given a positive review by AudioFile for its compassionate voice and well-blended narratives. The magazine said that occasional mispronunciations by Ortiz were distracting, but commended their thoughtful and smooth narration.
