= KB Brookins =

American writer and poet (born 1995)

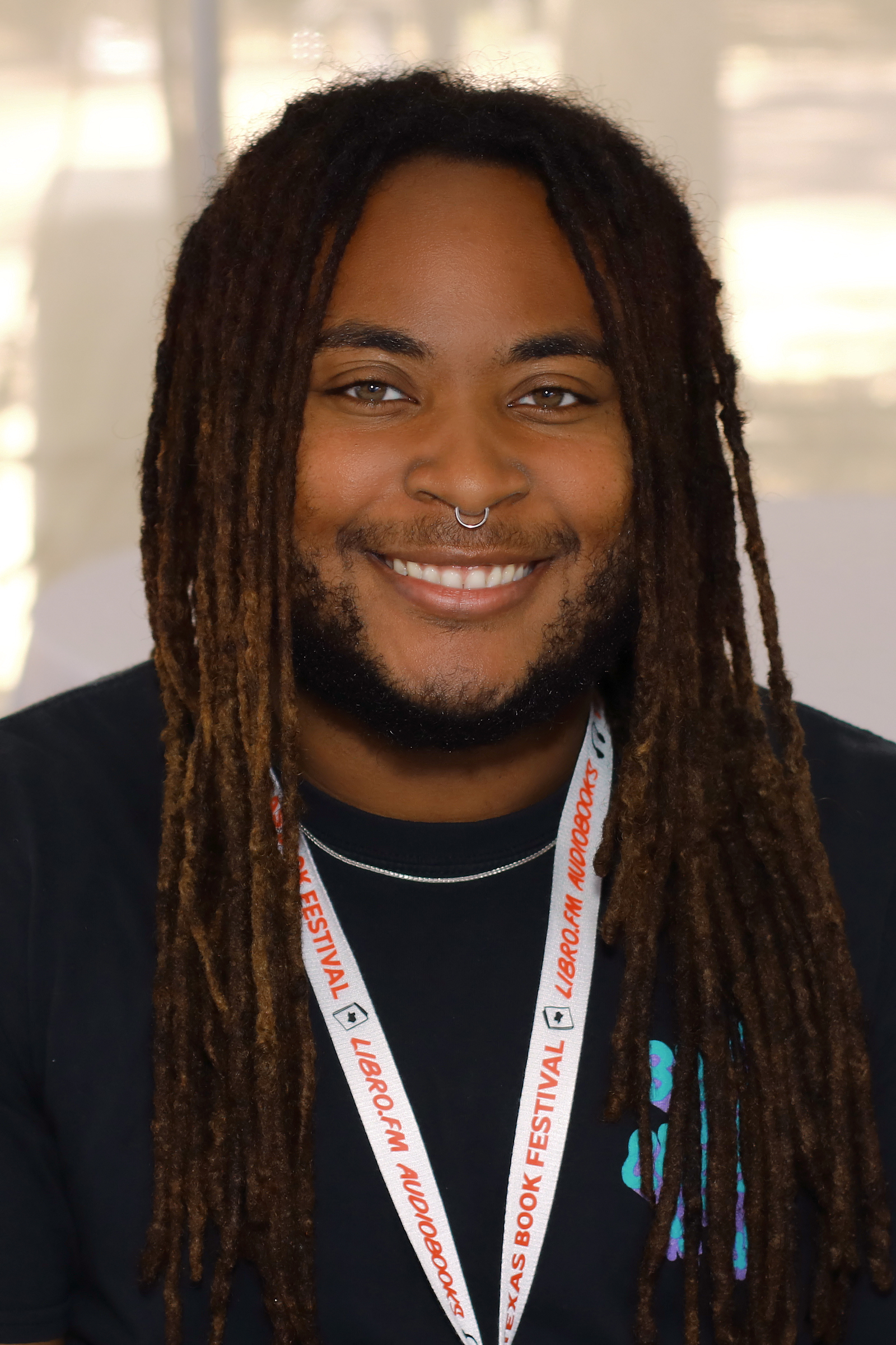
- Brookins at the 2024 Texas Book Festival
- Born: August 28, 1995 (age 31); Fort Worth, Texas, U.S.
- Education: Texas Christian University (BA); University of Texas at Austin (MFA)
- Occupation: Writer
- Writing career
- Genres: Poetry, creative nonfiction
- Notable works: Pretty: A Memoir, Freedom House, How to Identify Yourself with a Wound
- Notable awards: Stonewall Book Award (2024); Lambda Literary Award (2025); GLCA New Writers Award (2025)

KB Brookins (born August 28, 1995) is a Black American writer and poet. Brookins was awarded a 2023 National Endowment for the Arts Creative Writing Fellowship and is the author of the poetry collections How to Identify Yourself with a Wound and Freedom House and the memoir Pretty: A Memoir, which won the 2025 Lambda Literary Award for Transgender Nonfiction.

== Early life and education ==
Brookins was born and raised in Fort Worth, Texas. They earned a BA from Texas Christian University in 2017 and later completed an MFA at the University of Texas at Austin.

== Career ==
Brookins's writing includes poetry and creative nonfiction. Their work has appeared in venues including Poetry, Kenyon Review, The Cincinnati Review, Electric Literature, and the Academy of American Poets' Poem-a-Day series.

Freedom House explores themes including race, transgender identity, and gentrification. Vogue described the collection as urgent while still holding space for self-determination. The book won the 2024 Stonewall Book Award (Barbara Gittings Literature Award).

=== Pretty: A Memoir ===
Brookins began writing Pretty: A Memoir after seeking transmasculine writing during their medical transition and finding few works by people of color. They decided to write about their own experience and that of other transmasculine people of color who they had spoken to, and later polished these essays for publication. The memoir includes prose and poetry. The book examines Brookins's childhood and young adulthood, covering their relationship with belonging, religion, music, sexuality, gender expression, race, and stereotyping.

In 2025, Pretty: A Memoir won the GLCA New Writers Award in Creative Nonfiction. Pretty also won the 2025 Lambda Literary Award for Transgender Nonfiction.

== Personal life ==
Brookins is non-binary and uses they/them pronouns.

== Works ==
=== Books ===
- Pretty: A Memoir (Alfred A. Knopf, 2024). ISBN 9780593537145.
- Freedom House (Deep Vellum, 2023). ISBN 9781646052639.
- How to Identify Yourself with a Wound (Kallisto Gaia Press, 2022). ISBN 9781952224133.

=== Selected poems ===
- "My therapist called it climate despair" (Poetry, March 2023).
- "Notes After Watching the Inauguration" (Poetry, March 2023).
- "Snake Plant" (Poetry, March 2023).
- "T Shot #9: Ode to my Sharps Container" (Poetry, March 2023).
- "Remix #2" (Kenyon Review, 2023).
- "What's On Your Mind, KB?" (The Cincinnati Review, 2023).
- "Love Machine" (Split This Rock, 2023).
- "Good Grief" (Academy of American Poets, 2022).

=== Essays ===
- "KB Brookins on 'T Shot #4'" (Poetry Society of America, 2023).
- "Freedom House: A Sonic Bibliography" (Oxford American, 2023).
- "Trans Texans Are Being Surveilled, This Is Everyone’s Issue" (Autostraddle, 2022).
- "How Kendrick Lamar Stumbles Toward Queer and Trans Allyship on 'Auntie Diaries'" (Okayplayer, 2022).
- "This Is What It's Like Going to the Gynecologist When You're Black, Trans and in Texas" (HuffPost, 2022).
- "Why Coming Out to My Family Isn't on My Holiday To-Do List" (Teen Vogue, 2021).

=== Zines ===
- Nothing Was the Cause of Their Deaths. (Winter Storm Project, 2023). ISBN 9798218222475.
- A New Relationship to Pain (LibroMobile, 2021).
- In Another Life (2019).

=== Art exhibits ===
- Freedom House: An Exhibition (2024).

== Awards and fellowships ==
- 2018 Lambda Literary Foundation Writer’s Retreat for Emerging LGBTQ Voices Fellow (poetry).
- 2021 PEN America Emerging Voices Fellow (poetry).
- 2022 Academy of American Poets Treehouse Climate Action Prize recipient.
- 2023 National Endowment for the Arts Creative Writing Fellow.
- 2024 Stonewall Book Award (Barbara Gittings Literature Award).
- 2025 Lambda Literary Award in Transgender Nonfiction.
- 2025 GLCA New Writers Award in Creative Nonfiction.
