= CeCé Telfer =

Jamaican-born athlete

- Born: Jamaica
- Education: Franklin Pierce University
- Years active: 2016–present
- Sports career
- Country: United States
- Sport: Track and field
- Event: 400-meter hurdle
- College team: Franklin Pierce Ravens
- Coached by: Zach Emerson

CeCé Telfer is a Jamaican-born athlete who, in 2019, became the first openly transgender person to win an NCAA title. While a student athlete at Franklin Pierce University, Telfer first competed in the men's division from 2016 to 2017 but after coming out and beginning transition, Telfer was allowed to compete in the women's division. Telfer eventually took first place in the 400-meter hurdles event in June 2019.

== Career ==
=== NCAA track and field ===
Telfer is a trans woman but competed on the Franklin Pierce University men's track and field team in 2016 and 2017. In the 400 m hurdles at the 36-inch men's division height, she ranked 200th in 2016 and 390th in 2017 among NCAA Division II athletes. Under NCAA rules, transgender athletes can compete in women's events after completing one calendar year of testosterone suppression treatment.

Telfer qualified for the NCAA Women's Division II Outdoor Track and Field Championships in 2019, ranking third in 60-meter hurdles and seventh in the 200-meter dash nationally in the women's division. She finished sixth in the 60-meter hurdles finals, and first in the 400-meter hurdles finals at the 30-inch women's division height. Telfer gained wide public recognition after Donald Trump Jr. quoted an article title referring to Telfer as a "biological male," calling her recent competition wins a "grave injustice" against "young women".

Following her victory in the 400-meter hurdles, Telfer appeared on Outside the Lines on ESPN on June 13, 2019. During her interview, she praised her coaches for their support, detailing how they took steps to protect her physical and mental well-being during the competition, hiring additional security guards and advising her to stay off of social media for 48 hours following her win to help limit her exposure to transphobic comments and postings.

In another interview with Outsports, Telfer denied that testosterone gave her an advantage over cisgender athletes, saying that she'd been on hormone therapy for quite some time and that her testosterone levels were lower than the average woman's as a result. Additionally, Telfer stated that her height, which is 6' 2", put her at a disadvantage as her size gives her wind resistance and because in the women's 100-meter hurdles, one of her chosen events, the hurdles are placed much closer together than the men's hurdles were, over half a meter closer together.

=== USA track and field ===
Telfer sought to compete in the 2020 Olympic Trials in the 400-meter hurdles. While failing to meet the 56.50 qualifying standard, USATF increased the size of the field and with a 2021 season best of 57.5, Telfer was accepted into the field. She was later removed from the event after USA Track & Field determined that she was not able to prove her eligibility for the event under guidelines set for transgender athletes.

=== Writing ===
In 2024, Telfer published Make it Count: My Fight to Become the First Transgender Olympic Runner. The memoir covers her youth and athletics career, from facing transphobia in her hometown, to embracing running as a coping mechanism, and finding freedom and success in college.

Make it Count was a finalist for the 2025 Lambda Literary Award for Transgender Nonfiction. Kirkus Reviews labeled it "an inspirational portrait of trailblazing sports excellence", and SELF selected it as their 2024 summer book club pick.

== Personal life ==
Telfer was born in Jamaica and assigned male at birth. She was raised by a single mother, one of three children. The family moved to Canada when she was 12, before settling in New Hampshire when she was in her junior year of high school. Her high school coach, Andrew Gamble, recruited Telfer for track and field.

== See also ==
- Transgender people in sports
