= Joshua Jennifer Espinoza =

American trans woman poet (born 1987)

- Born: 1987 (age 38–39); Riverside, California, U.S.
- Education: University of California, Riverside (MFA)
- Occupation: Poet
- Notable work: I Don't Want to Be Understood
- Website: joshuajenniferespinoza.com

Joshua Jennifer Espinoza (born 1987) is an American trans woman poet from Riverside, California. Her poetry collection I Don't Want to Be Understood was a finalist for the 2026 Kingsley Tufts Poetry Award.

== Life and career ==
Espinoza discovered the work of Langston Hughes in middle school and later developed her writing through blog culture in the 2000s. She holds an MFA in creative writing from the University of California, Riverside and has taught creative writing at Occidental College.

Her work has appeared in Poetry, The Nation, The Paris Review, American Poetry Review, The Rumpus, and elsewhere.

Espinoza's first chapbook, i'm alive / it hurts / i love it, was published by Boost House and later reissued by Big Lucks Books in 2019. Her later collections include There Should Be Flowers (2016), Outside of the Body There Is Something like Hope (2018), and I Don't Want to Be Understood (2024).

Espinoza's poem "Death Before Detransition", published in Boshemia Magazine, was later incorporated into Andrew Yee's 2025 Trans Requiem, an orchestral composition.

== Themes and reception ==
Reviewers have described Espinoza's poetry as centering trans womanhood, especially in relation to erasure, visibility, and survival. In There Should Be Flowers, according to Blackbird, the speaker moves through "a world that insists on the erasure of trans voices"; Dorothy Chan wrote that I'm Alive. It Hurts. I Love It. places "the queer trans woman's voice" at its center; and a Poetry Foundation review wrote that I Don't Want to Be Understood explores life "in a world that rejects the mere notion of transness".

I Don't Want to Be Understood was also a finalist for the 2025 Lambda Literary Award for Transgender Poetry and the 2025 Leslie Feinberg Award for Trans and Gender-Variant Literature.

== Bibliography ==
- i'm alive / it hurts / i love it. Boost House, 2014. ISBN 9780996069113
- There Should Be Flowers. Civil Coping Mechanisms, 2016. ISBN 9781937865733
- Outside of the Body There Is Something like Hope. Big Lucks, 2018. ISBN 9781941985830
- I'm Alive / It Hurts / I Love It (2nd ed.). Big Lucks, 2019. ISBN 9781941985304
- I Don't Want to Be Understood. Alice James Books, 2024. ISBN 9781949944631
