= Rindge, New Hampshire =

- Town
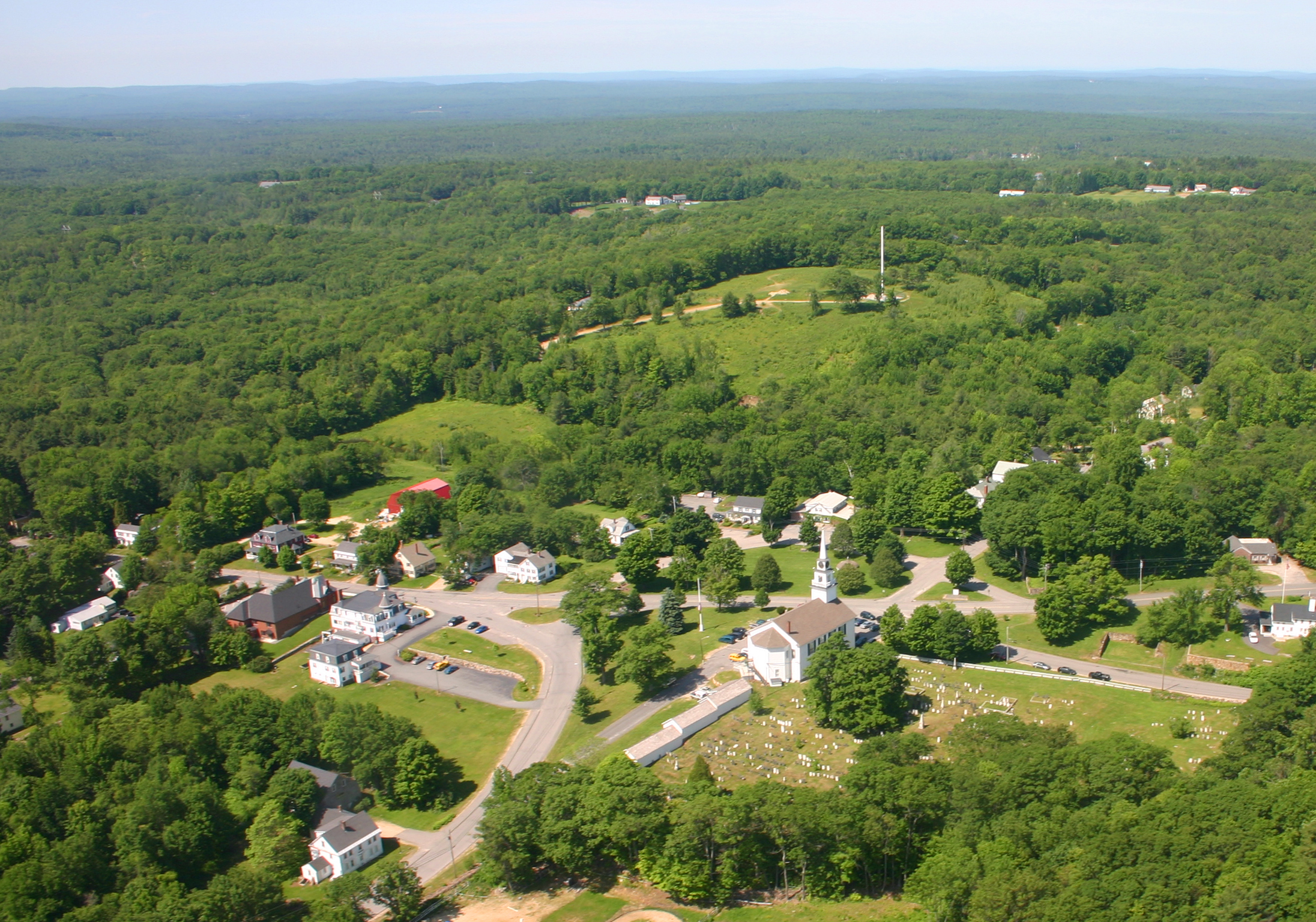
- Rindge Center

- Seal

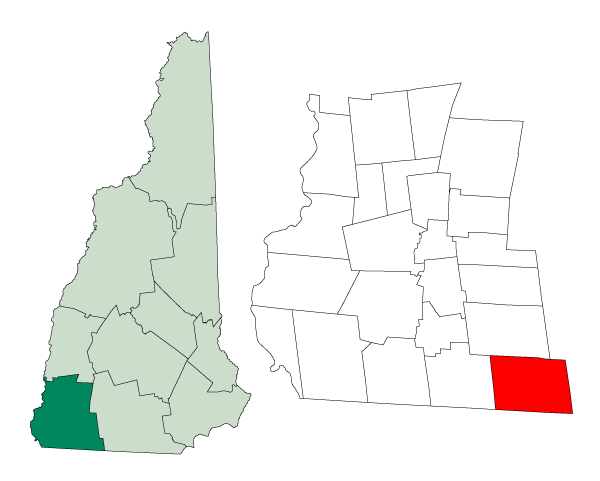
- Location in Cheshire County, New Hampshire
- Coordinates: 42°45′10″N 72°00′37″W
- Country: United States
- State: New Hampshire
- County: Cheshire
- Incorporated: 1768
- Villages: Rindge; Converseville; East Rindge; West Rindge

Area
  - Total: 39.8 sq mi (103.1 km^{2})
  - Land: 37.1 sq mi (96.1 km^{2})
  - Water: 2.7 sq mi (7.0 km^{2}) 6.76%
- Elevation: 1,316 ft (401 m)

Population (2020)
  - Total: 6,476
  - Density: 175/sq mi (67.4/km^{2})
- Time zone: UTC−5 (Eastern)
  - Summer (DST): UTC−4 (Eastern)
- ZIP code: 03461
- Area code: 603
- FIPS code: 33-64580
- GNIS feature ID: 873707
- Website: rindgenh.org

Rindge is a town in Cheshire County, New Hampshire, United States. The population was 6,476 at the 2020 census, up from 6,014 at the 2010 census, and was an estimated 6,502 in 2025. Rindge is home to Franklin Pierce University, the Cathedral of the Pines and part of Annett State Forest.

== History ==
=== Native American inhabitants ===
The land in and around Rindge was originally inhabited by ancestors of the Abenaki tribe of Native Americans. Archeological evidence from nearby Swanzey indicates that the region was inhabited as much as 11,000 years ago (coinciding with the end of the last glacial period). As much as half of the Western Abenakis were victims of a wave of epidemics that coincided with the arrival of Europeans in the late 16th and early 17th centuries. Later, many of the Western Abenaki present in southwestern New Hampshire chose to relocate to Canada during Colonial times, primarily due to their allegiance with the French during the French and Indian Wars.

=== Settlement by European colonists ===
In the eighteenth century, Massachusetts granted unappropriated land to veterans of Sir William Phipps' 1690 expedition against French-held Canada as compensation for services. Whole townships were granted to certain military companies and became known as "Canada" townships. Granted in 1736 by Governor Jonathan Belcher to soldiers from Rowley, Massachusetts, Rindge was first known as "Rowley-Canada". But the Masonian proprietors were making competing claims to the area, and in 1740 commissioners of the Crown decided that the boundary between Massachusetts and New Hampshire lay south of Rowley-Canada. Consequently, it was re-granted in 1749 by Governor Benning Wentworth as "Monadnock No. 1", or "South Monadnock". The town was incorporated in 1768 by Governor John Wentworth as "Rindge", in honor of Captain Daniel Rindge of Portsmouth, New Hampshire, one of the original grant holders, and the one who represented New Hampshire's claim to the land before the king.

Captain Abel Platts is credited as being Rindge's first temporary settler, arriving in 1738 to take possession of his family's land grant. But disputes about the grants, combined with the outbreak in 1744 of King George's War, made it untenable to remain in Rindge, so early settlers abandoned it. Platts and others returned in 1752, and starting in 1758, settlement increased steadily. There were 1,274 residents by 1859, when water powered industries included three gristmills, thirteen sawmills, thirteen shingle mills, six stave mills, two planing mills, and several clapboard mills.

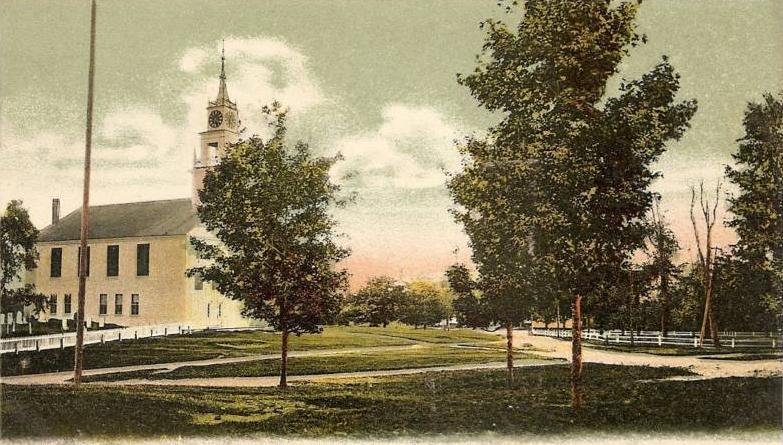
The Common in 1906

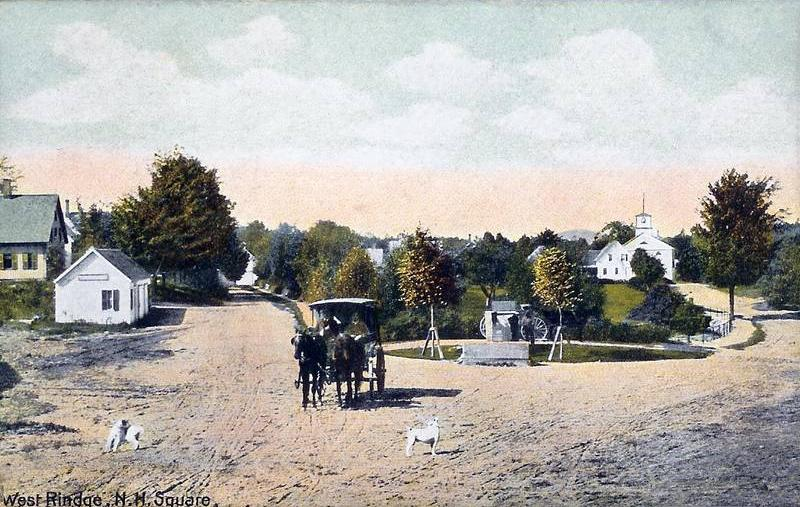
West Rindge in 1910

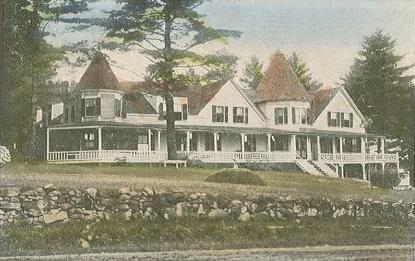
Pinecroft Inn c. 1915

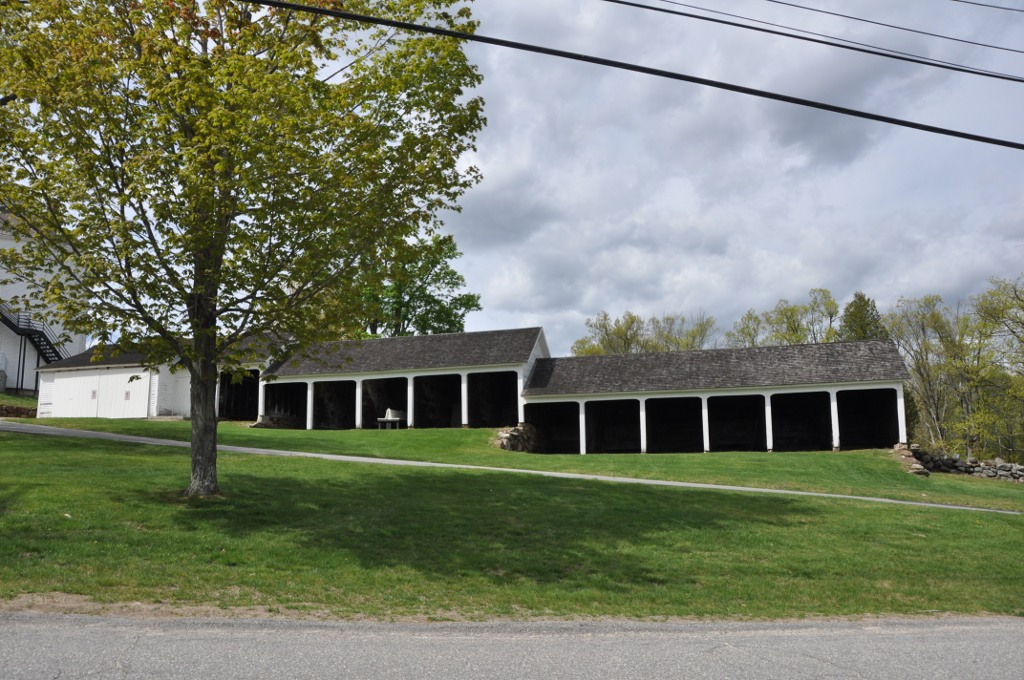
Historic horse sheds behind the meeting house

== Geography ==
According to the United States Census Bureau, the town has a total area of 39.8 square miles (103.1 km^{2}), of which 37.1 square miles (96.1 km^{2}) are land and 2.7 square miles (7.0 km^{2}) are water, comprising 6.76% of the town. Rindge is located in a hilly upland lake region. Hubbard Pond is in the northeast, Contoocook Lake on the northern boundary, Pearly Lake is in the northwest, and Lake Monomonac is on the southern boundary. The town is located on a regional watershed divide and is the headwaters for two river systems. The Contoocook River flows north to the Merrimack River, thence to the Gulf of Maine, and the North Branch of the Millers River flows southwest to the Connecticut River, thence to Long Island Sound. Rindge's highest point is on its eastern border, on the lower slopes of Pratt Mountain, where the elevation reaches 1,505 feet (459 m) above sea level.

Rindge is home to the villages of Rindge Center, East Rindge, Converseville, and West Rindge. The town is crossed by U.S. Route 202 and New Hampshire Route 119.

=== Adjacent municipalities ===
- Jaffrey (north)
- Sharon (northeast)
- New Ipswich (east)
- Ashburnham, Massachusetts (southeast)
- Winchendon, Massachusetts (south)
- Fitzwilliam (west)

== Demographics ==
Historical population
Census	Pop.	Note	%±
1790	1,143		—
1800	1,196		4.6%
1810	1,226		2.5%
1820	1,298		5.9%
1830	1,269		−2.2%
1840	1,161		−8.5%
1850	1,274		9.7%
1860	1,231		−3.4%
1870	1,107		−10.1%
1880	934		−15.6%
1890	996		6.6%
1900	855		−14.2%
1910	706		−17.4%
1920	643		−8.9%
1930	610		−5.1%
1940	629		3.1%
1950	707		12.4%
1960	941		33.1%
1970	2,175		131.1%
1980	3,375		55.2%
1990	4,941		46.4%
2000	5,451		10.3%
2010	6,014		10.3%
2020	6,476		7.7%
2024 (est.)	6,543		1.0%
U.S. Decennial Census

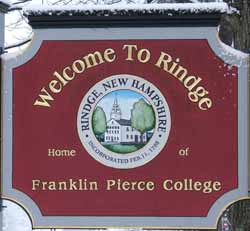
Welcome sign

As of the census of 2020, there were 6,476 residents and 2,031 households in Rindge. The population density was 174.1 inhabitants per square mile (67.2/km^{2}). There were 2,361 housing units at an average density of 63.5 per square mile (24.5/km^{2}). The racial makeup of the town was 91.17% White, 2.83% African American, 1.10% Asian, 0.29% American Indian and Alaskan Native, 0.08% Native Hawaiian and Other Pacific Islander, 0.63% from other races, and 3.91% from two or more races. Hispanic or Latino people of any race were 3.07% of the population.

As of the census of 2010, there were 6,014 people, 1,805 households, and 1,316 families residing in the town. The population density was 156.8 inhabitants per square mile (60.5/km^{2}). There were 2,224 housing units at an average density of 55.6 per square mile (21.5/km^{2}). The racial makeup of the town was 95.56% White, 1.33% African American, 0.15% Native American, 0.89% Asian, 0.00% Pacific Islander, 0.45% from other races, and 1.61% from two or more races. Hispanic or Latino people of any race were 1.28% of the population.

There were 1,805 households, of which 33.1% had children under the age of 18 living with them, 63.0% were married couples living together, 6.0% had a female householder with no husband present, and 27.1% were non-families. 19.3% of all households were made up of individuals, and 6.9% had someone living alone who was 65 years of age or older. The average household size was 2.69 and the average family size was 3.11.

In the town, the population was spread out, with 29.6% under the age of 20, 20.7% from 20 to 29, 8.7% from 30 to 39, 12.2% from 40 to 49, 19.3% from 50 to 64, and 9.5% who were 65 years of age or older. The median age was 29.7 years.

For the period 2013–2017, the estimated median income for a household in the town was $68,250, and the median income for a family was $82,917. The per capita income for the town was $27,363. About 3.7% of families and 9.6% of the population were below the poverty line, including 4.0% of those under age 18 and 2.1% of those age 65 or over.

== Education ==
Rindge belongs to the Jaffrey-Rindge Cooperative School District, which has a total of three schools. Rindge is also the home of Franklin Pierce University.

Colleges and universities

- Franklin Pierce University

Public secondary schools

- Conant Middle High School (located in Jaffrey)

Public elementary schools

- Rindge Memorial School
- Jaffrey Grade School (located in Jaffrey)

Private schools

- Hampshire Country School
- Heritage Christian School

== Sites of interest ==
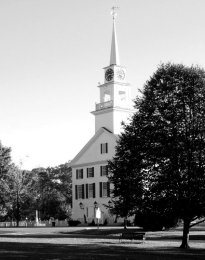
Rindge Meetinghouse

- Annett State Forest, which includes Annett Wayside Park with picnic tables, toilets, and a hiking trail to Black Reservoir.
- Cathedral of the Pines, a national memorial for all American war dead. The location had been selected by Lieutenant Sanderson Sloane and his wife as the place to build their home when he returned from World War II. A cathedral was created by his parents, Dr. and Mrs. Douglas Sloane, after learning that their son was lost when the bomber he flew was shot down over Germany on February 22, 1944.
- The Rindge Meeting House, built in 1796, is one of the largest town meeting houses in northern New England and one of the few civic buildings in the region that still straddles the separation of church and state. The building is owned by the town, and the second floor is leased to the First Congregational Church, which uses it for services and other church functions. The first floor is still used for town functions such as Zoning Board meetings as well as community functions such as fairs, Scout meetings, exercise classes, and the like.

== Notable people ==
- George P. Barker (1807–1848), state congressman from New York
- Addison Gardiner (1797–1883), chief judge of the New York Court of Appeals
- Enoch Hale (1733–1813), militia colonel
- Nathan Hale (1743–1780), military officer, Revolutionary War hero
- Amasa Norcross (1824–1898), U.S. congressman
- Edward Payson (1783–1827), preacher
- Mary Lee Ware (1858–1937), farmer, patron sponsor of Harvard's Glass Flowers collection
- Marshall Pickney Wilder (1798–1886), merchant, amateur horticulturalist, politician
