= 34th GLAAD Media Awards =

Awards ceremony

- Date: March 30, 2023; May 13, 2023
- Location: The Beverly Hilton (Beverly Hills, California); New York Hilton Midtown (New York, New York)
- Country: United States

The 34th GLAAD Media Awards is the 2023 annual presentation of the GLAAD Media Awards by GLAAD honoring 2022 films, television shows, video games, musicians and works of journalism that fairly, accurately and inclusively represent the LGBT community and issues relevant to the community. As in previous years, the awards were presented in two groups at two separate ceremonies, which for this awards edition took place on March 30, 2023 in Los Angeles and on May 13, 2023 in New York City. The eligibility period for the 34th GLAAD Media Awards ran from January 1, 2022 to December 31, 2022 and the nominations were announced on January 18, 2023 by RuPaul's Drag Race stars Sasha Colby and Salina EsTittes on the GLAAD YouTube channel.

== Category changes ==
For the 34th ceremony, GLAAD announced the introduction of two new categories: Outstanding Podcast and Outstanding Live TV Journalism - Segment or Special. They also revealed changes to the Outstanding Reality Program category, which was split into Outstanding Reality Program and Outstanding Reality Program - Competition, and the Outstanding Kids and Family Programming category, which was split into Live Action and Animated categories. In addition, the Outstanding Film – Wide Release category featured ten nominees for the first time and separate category for streaming films and TV movies was introduced. Finally, a new category for Outstanding Children's Programming was introduced to honor content made for younger children.

== Winners and nominees ==
=== Film ===
| Outstanding Film – Wide Release: Bros (Universal Pictures); A Man Called Otto (Sony Pictures); Bodies Bodies Bodies (A24); Everything Everywhere All at Once (A24); Lightyear (Pixar); Nope (Universal Pictures); Scream (Paramount Pictures); Spoiler Alert (Focus Features); Strange World (Walt Disney Studios Motion Pictures); Tár (Focus Features) | Outstanding Film – Limited Release: The Inspection (A24); Anaïs in Love (Magnolia Pictures); Benediction (Roadside Attractions); Death and Bowling (Wolfe Releasing); Firebird (Roadside Attractions); Girl Picture (Strand Releasing); My Policeman (Prime Video); Neptune Frost (Kino Lorber); The Swimmer (Strand Releasing); Wendell & Wild (Netflix) | Outstanding Film – Streaming or TV: Anything's Possible (Prime Video) (tie); Fire Island (Hulu) (tie); B-Boy Blues (BET+); A Christmas to Treasure (Lifetime); Crush (Hulu); Do Revenge (Netflix); The Fallout (HBO Max); The Holiday Sitter (Hallmark); Three Months (Paramount+); Wildhood (Hulu) |

=== Television ===
| Outstanding New TV Series: A League of Their Own (Prime Video); Heartbreak High (Netflix); High School (Amazon Freevee); Interview with the Vampire (AMC); Our Flag Means Death (HBO Max); Queer as Folk (Peacock); The Rookie: Feds (ABC); The Sandman (Netflix); Somebody Somewhere (HBO); Willow (Disney+) | Outstanding Limited or Anthology Series: The White Lotus (HBO); American Horror Story: NYC (FX); The Ignorant Angels (Hulu); The Best Man: The Final Chapters (Peacock); Welcome to Chippendales (Hulu) |
| Outstanding Comedy Series: What We Do in the Shadows (FX); Abbott Elementary (ABC); Derry Girls (Netflix); Hacks (HBO Max); Harley Quinn (HBO Max); Love, Victor (Hulu); Never Have I Ever (Netflix); Only Murders in the Building (Hulu); The Sex Lives of College Girls (HBO Max); Sort Of (HBO Max) | Outstanding Drama Series: 9-1-1: Lone Star (Fox); Chucky (Syfy); Good Trouble (Freeform); Gossip Girl (HBO Max); Grey's Anatomy (ABC); The L Word: Generation Q (Showtime); P-Valley (Starz); September Mornings (Prime Video); Star Trek: Discovery (Paramount+); The Umbrella Academy (Netflix) |
| Outstanding Reality Program: We're Here (HBO); Bargain Block (HGTV); The Come Up (Freeform); Family Karma (Bravo); Generation Drag (Discovery+); Getting Curious with Jonathan Van Ness (Netflix); Mathis Family Matters (E!); The Real World Homecoming: New Orleans (Paramount+); Southern Hospitality (Bravo); Trixie Motel (Discovery+) | Outstanding Reality Competition Program: Dancing with the Stars (Disney+); The Big Brunch (HBO Max); Legendary (HBO Max); Lizzo's Watch Out for the Big Grrrls (Prime Video); RuPaul's Drag Race (VH1); So You Think You Can Dance (Fox); Top Chef (Bravo); Upcycle Nation (Fuse); The Voice (NBC); Worst Cooks in America (Food Network) |
| Outstanding Documentary: Framing Agnes (Kino Lorber); All the Beauty and the Bloodshed (HBO); The Andy Warhol Diaries (Netflix); The Book of Queer (Discovery+); Mama's Boy (HBO); Maurice Hines: Bring Them Back (Starz); Mormon No More (Hulu); Queer for Fear (Shudder); Sirens (Oscilloscope); Stay on Board: The Leo Baker Story (Netflix) | Outstanding Variety or Talk Show Episode: "The War Over Gender" – The Problem with Jon Stewart (Apple TV+); "David Archuleta" – The Jennifer Hudson Show; "Don't Say Gay" – The Amber Ruffin Show (Peacock); "Here I Am" – Tamron Hall (ABC); "Jackie Goldschneider & Danny Pellegrino" – Watch What Happens Live with Andy Cohen (Bravo); "JoJo Siwa Celebrates Her Golden Birthday" – The View (ABC); "LGBTQ Trailblazers" – If We're Being Honest with Laverne Cox (E!); "Spirit Day" – The Kelly Clarkson Show (NBCUniversal); "Transgender Rights II" – Last Week Tonight with John Oliver (HBO); "Virtel It Like It Is: Gay Velma Drives GOP Mad" – Jimmy Kimmel Live! (ABC) |

Children's Programming

| Outstanding Children's Programming: "Adoptasaurus Rex" – Dino Ranch (Disney Junior); "Family Picnic" – Sesame Street (HBO Max); Firebuds (Disney Junior); "The Mint Gala" – Strawberry Shortcake: Berry in the Big City (Netflix); Pinecone & Pony (Apple TV+) | Outstanding Kids and Family Programming - Live Action: Heartstopper (Netflix); Better Nate Than Ever (Disney+); First Day (Hulu); High School Musical: The Musical: The Series (Disney+); Monster High: The Movie (Nickelodeon/Paramount+); Power Rangers Dino Fury (Netflix); Raven's Home (Disney Channel); Rebel Cheer Squad (Netflix); Trevor: The Musical (Disney+); Zombies 3 (Disney+) | Outstanding Kids and Family Programming - Animated: Dead End: Paranormal Park (Netflix); Amphibia (Disney Channel); Battle Kitty (Netflix); Big Nate (Nickelodeon); Craig of the Creek (Cartoon Network); The Dragon Prince (Netflix); Jurassic World Camp Cretaceous (Netflix); The Owl House (Disney Channel); The Proud Family: Louder and Prouder (Disney+); Trick or Treat Scooby-Doo! (Cartoon Network) |

=== Other ===
| Outstanding Broadway Production: A Strange Loop; & Juliet; Ain't No Mo'; Kimberly Akimbo; Take Me Out | Outstanding Video Game: Apex Legends (Respawn/Electronic Arts); Desta: The Memories Between (Ustwo Games); Haven (The Game Bakers); I Was a Teenage Exocolonist (Northway Games/Finji); Need for Speed Unbound (Criterion Games/Electronic Arts); Signalis (Humble Games); The Quarry (Supermassive Games/2k); Tiny Tina's Wonderlands (Gearbox Software/2k); World of Warcraft: Dragonflight (Blizzard Entertainment); Wylde Flowers (Studio Drydock) |
| Outstanding Comic Book: Poison Ivy by G. Willow Wilson, Marcio Takara, Atagun Ilhan, Brian Level, Stefano Gaudiano, Jay Leisten, Arif Prianto, Ivan Plascencia and Hassan Otsmane-Elhaou (DC Comics); I Hate This Place by Kyle Starks, Artyom Topilin, Lee Loughridge and Pat Brousseau (Image Comics); Immortal X-Men by Kieron Gillen, Lucas Werneck, Michele Bandini, David Curiel, Dijjo Lima and Clayton Cowles (Marvel Comics); New Mutants by Vita Ayala, Danny Lore, Charlie Jane Anders, Danilo Beyruth, Rod Reis, Jan Duursema, Guillermo Sanna, Alex Lins, Alberto Alburquerque, Ro Stein, Ted Brandt, Dan Brown, Ruth Redmond, Carlos Lopez, Tamra Bonvillain and Travis Lanham (Marvel Comics); The Nice House on the Lake by James Tynion IV, Alvaro Martinez Bueno, Jordie Bellaire and Andworld Design (DC Comics); Sins of the Black Flamingo by Andrew Wheeler, Travis Moore, Tamra Bonvillain and Aditya Bidikar (Image Comics); Star Wars: Doctor Aphra by Alyssa Wong, Minkyu Jung, Natacha Bustos, Rachelle Rosenberg and Joe Caramagna (Marvel Comics); Superman: Son of Kal-El by Tom Taylor, Nicole Maines, John Timms, Cian Tormey, Raul Fernandez, Bruno Redondo, Wade Von Grawbadger, Adriano Lucas, Clayton Henry, Ruairi Coleman, Scott Hanna, Hi-Fi Color, Federico Blee, Wes Abbott, Matt Herms, Marcelo Maiolo, Romulo Fajardo, Jr. and Dave Sharpe (DC Comics); Tim Drake: Robin by Meghan Fitzmartin, Riley Rossmo, Lee Loughridge, Tom Napolitano and Rob Leigh (DC Comics); Wynd: The Throne in the Sky by James Tynion IV, Michael Dialynas and Andworld Design (Boom! Studios) | Outstanding Graphic Novel/Anthology: Young Men in Love (A Wave Blue World); Chef's Kiss by Jarrett Melendez, Danica Brine, Hank Jones and Hassan Otsmane-Elhaou (Oni Press); Coven by Jennifer Dugan and Kit Seaton (Putnam); DC Pride 2022 (DC Comics); Doughnuts and Doom by Balazs Lorinczi (Top Shelf Productions); Fine: A Comic About Gender by Rhea Ewing (W.W. Norton & Company); Galaxy: The Prettiest Star by Jadzia Axelrod and Jess Taylor (DC Comics); Heartstopper Volume 4 by Alice Oseman (GRAPHIX); Magical Boy by The Kao (GRAPHIX); Marvel's Voices: Pride #1 (Marvel Comics) |
| Outstanding Music Artist: Fletcher, Girl of My Dreams (Capitol Records); Anitta, Versions of Me (Warner Records); Betty Who, Big! (BMG); Demi Lovato, Holy Fvck (Island Records); Hayley Kiyoko, Panorama (Atlantic Records); Honey Dijon, Black Girl Magic (Classic Music Company); Kim Petras, Slut Pop (Republic Records); Muna, MUNA (Saddest Factory Records); Orville Peck, Bronco (Columbia Records); Rina Sawayama, Hold the Girl (Dirty Hit) | Outstanding Breakthrough Music Artist: Dove Cameron; Brooke Eden; Doechii; Dreamer Isioma; Ethel Cain; Isaac Dunbar; Jordy; Omar Apollo; Reneé Rapp; Steve Lacy |
| Outstanding Blog: Mombian; Charlotte's Web Thoughts; Holy Bullies and Headless Monsters; My Fabulous Disease; The Reckoning | Outstanding Podcast: Sibling Rivalry (Studio71) (tie); TransLash Podcast with Imara Jones (TransLash Media) (tie); The Bald and the Beautiful with Trixie and Katya (Studio71); In the Deep: Stories that Shape Us (iHeartMedia); Las Culturistas with Matt Rogers and Bowen Yang (iHeartMedia/Big Money Players); Life Out Loud with LZ Granderson (ABC News); LGBTQ&A (Jeffrey Masters/The Advocate); Pridecast (iHeartMedia); V Interesting (Lemonada Media); Yaas Jesus! (Daniel Franzese Media) |

=== Journalism ===
| Outstanding TV Journalism Segment: "HIV in the Deep South" – In Real Life (Scripps News); "Critics Say New School Policies In Florida Ostracize LGBTQ Students" – PBS NewsHour (PBS); "A History That Never Should Have Been: Julius’ Bar” – PIX11 Morning News (WPIX-TV); "How Psychiatrist ‘Dr. Anonymous’ Impacted The Fight For Gay Rights" – Sunday Today (NBC); "Inside The Effort To Ban Conversion Therapy" – NBC News NOW; "Introducing Nora J.S. Reichardt" – WOIO/KCWI-TV; "Life As A Trans Soldier" – Vice News Tonight (Vice); "Man Who Helped Stop The Club Q Shooter: ‘I’m Just A Normal Guy'” – Anderson Cooper 360° (CNN); "The Show Must Go On – Pride Events Targeted" – Nightline (ABC); "The Struggle Of Coming Out In A Religious Family" – Good Morning America (ABC) | Outstanding TV Journalism – Long-Form: "Pride | To Be Seen" – Soul of a Nation (ABC); "Dear Noah: Pages from a Family Diary” – NBC News NOW; "Families of Trans Kids Are Seeking Sanctuary" – Vice News Tonight (Vice); "NY1 Celebrates Pride: The New Generation” – Spectrum News NY1; "Our America: Who I’m Meant To Be” – (ABC Localish); "Pride And Backlash" – NBC News NOW; "Pride of Stage and Screen" – MSNBC; "This Is Football" – Beyond Limits (CBS); "Unapologetic: A Conversation on Pride” – MSG Network; "Viral: A World Without AIDS” – ABC News Live |
Outstanding Live TV Journalism – Segment or Special: "The Last Thing Before We Go: Stephanie Ruhle Talks Spirit Day" – The 11th Hour (MSNBC); "25 News: Celebrating Our Pride” (KXXV-TV); "Chris Hayes on the Right-Wing War on LGBTQ Existence" – All in with Chris Hayes (MSNBC); "Don Lemon on the Anti-LGBTQ Congressman Who Attended His Gay Son’s Wedding" – CNN Tonight With Don Lemon (CNN); "GMA Out Loud: A Live Proposal in Times Square” – Good Morning America (ABC); "Joy-Ann Reid Interviews Will Larkins On Florida’s ‘Don’t Say Gay’ Bill" – The Reid Out (MSNBC); "Out Loud: ABC News Celebrates Pride” (ABC News Live); "Reggie Aqui Interviews Doctor and Mpox Patient on His Experience" (KGO-TV); "Robin Roberts Interviews Zander Moricz on His Censored Graduation Speech" – Good Morning America (ABC); "Symone Sanders-Townsend Interviews Colorado Springs Shooting Survivor Michael Anderson" – Symone (MSNBC)
| Outstanding Print Article: "Pediatricians Who Serve Trans Youth Face Increasing Harassment. Lifesaving Care Could Be on the Line" by Madeleine Carlisle (Time); "Activists Face An Avalanche Of Anti-Transgender Bills" by Casey Parks (The Washington Post); "After Threats From Extremist Groups, LGBTQ Activists Rally In Support Of The Center" by Desiree Stennet (Orlando Sentinel); "A Country Music Comeback: Ty Herndon Knows He Should be Dead" by Jason Sheeler (People); "Explainer: Pronouns, Nonbinary People and the Club Q Attack" by Jeff McMillan with Jesse Bedayn, Jim Mustian, Colleen Slevin, Jake Bleiberg, Lindsey Tanner (Associated Press); "‘King Richard’ Star Aunjanue Ellis Speaks Her Truth About Being Bisexual: ‘I Am Queer – This Is Who I Am'” by Angelique Jackson (Variety); "Niecy Nash And Wife Jessica Are Sure Betts" by Demetria L. Lucas (Essence); "Pride And Prejudice And Fire Island" by E. Alex Jung (New York Magazine); "Take My Wheelchair,’ Club Q Victim Tells Nurse Upon Leaving 22-Day Hospital Stay" by Carol McKinley and Tina Siegfried (The Gazette); "Will Russia Bring Its War On LGBTQ People To Ukraine?" by Kate Linthicum (Los Angeles Times) | Outstanding Magazine Overall Coverage: The Advocate; Metro Weekly; Out; People; Variety |
| Outstanding Online Journalism Article: "Alabama Is Trying to Raise the Legal Driving Age for Trans People to 19" by Nico Lang (TheDailyBeast.com); "A 25-Year-Old Got In A Taxi Outside An N.Y.C. Gay Bar. He Was Dead An Hour Later" by Jay Valle (NBCNews.com); "Does Providing Prep, A Drug That Prevents H.I.V., Clash With Christian Beliefs? An Overview Of Church Teaching" by Michael J. O’Loughlin (AmericaMagazine.org); "The Fear And Loathing Some People Show Sports Pride Events Brings Fear And Pain To This Fan" by Karleigh Webb (Outsports.com); "‘I See Myself In Her’: Brittney Griner’s Russia Trial Resonates With Queer Black Women And Nonbinary People" by Orion Rummler (the19th.org); "My Experience As A Target Of Kiwi Farms Speaks To A Scary Truth About Internet Culture" by Katelyn Burns (MSNBC.com); "The New York Times, The Atlantic, More Keep Publishing Transphobia. Why?" by Lexi McMenamin (TeenVogue.com); "School Board Meetings Are the New Frontline for LGBTQ+ Rights" by Colleen Hamilton (them.us); "There Is No Legitimate ‘Debate’ Over Gender-Affirming Healthcare" by Kit O’Connell (TexasObserver.org); "What’s So Scary About A Transgender Child?" by Emily St. James (Vox.com) | Outstanding Online Journalism – Video or Multimedia: "Logo’s Trans Youth Town Hall" by Raquel Willis (LogoTV.com); "+TALK: Sex, Dating & Disclosure” by Karl Schmid (PlusLifeMedia.com); “Deaths In The Family” (Insider.com); "Florida’s So-Called ‘Don’t Say Gay’ Bill Explained" (TampaBay.com); "How Is the Gay Rodeo Different?" by Jordon Jones (PBS.org); "How Medicine’s Fixation on the Sex Binary Harms Intersex People" (ScientificAmerican.com); "How New Anti-LGBTQ Laws Echo An Infamous Conservative Activist’s Campaign From 1977" by John Avlon (CNN.com); "Lawmakers Say Trans Athlete Bans Are About Protecting Women’s Sports ..." by Julie Kleigman (SI.com); "The Stonewall Generation Has Found Their Voice with Leslie Jordan & Donald M. Bell" (LGBTQNation.com); "White House Press Secretary Karine Jean-Pierre Opens Up About Brittney Griner’s Release" by Tracy E. Gilchrist (AdvocateChannel.com) |

=== Spanish Language ===
| Outstanding Spanish-Language Scripted Television Series: Los Espookys (HBO); La flor más bella (Netflix); Ser o no ser (RTVE); Smiley (Netflix); Las de la última fila (Netflix) | Outstanding Spanish-Language TV Journalism: "Vico Ortiz" – Primer Impacto (TelevisaUnivision); "Activistas exigen a Corrección trasladar de inmediato a Aurora a una cárcel de mujeres" – Las Noticias de Teleonce (TeleOnce); "Avanzan en Ohio y Texas propuestas similares a la ley ‘Don’t say gay’ de Florida" – Hoy Día (Telemundo); "Azafata le pide matrimonio a su novia piloto" – Edición Digital (TelevisaUnivision); "El ‘Chascas’ Valenzuela cuestiona la ley ‘No digas gay’ de Florida ‘Nos hizo retroceder 50 años'" – Hoy Día (TelevisaUnivision); "La Familia de la Sigla XX1" – Primer Impacto (TelevisaUnivision); "Jesús Ociel Baena, la primera persona no binaria en América Latina en llegar a un cargo de magistrado electoral" – Perspectivas México (CNN en Español); "La Magia de PFLAG" – Despierta América (Univision); "Mariachi Arcoíris: el grupo musical ‘queer’ que revoluciona el género” – Primer Impacto (TelevisaUnivision); "Protestan en 95 secundarias de Virginia por iniciativas del estado contra estudiantes transgénero" – Noticias Univision Washington D.C. (TelevisaUnivision) |
| Outstanding Spanish-Language Online Journalism Article: "Proyectos de ley anti LGBTQ+ en Florida son una ‘licencia para discriminar’ y reviven el dolor de Pulse, dicen grupos locales" por Jennifer A. Marcial Ocasio (OrlandoSentinel.com); "Amelio Robles fue el primer hombre trans mexicano y revolucionario" por Luis Garcia (Homosensual.com); "‘Esta es mi vida intersexual’: así fue cómo una boricua se convirtió en una heroína" por Marcos Billy Guzmán (ElNuevoDía.com); "Con miedo, pero peleando sus derechos: así viven las familias con niños LGBTQ en estados que quieren criminalizarlos” por Patricia Clarembeaux (Univision.com); "Hay que votar por nuestras vidas: la comunidad hispana LGBTQ explica qué le motiva a participar en esta elección” por Albinson Linares (Telemundo.com); "Madres con hijos de la comunidad LGBTQ unen fuerzas en América Latina para luchar por sus derechos" por Rodrigo Serrano (ElVocer.com); "Mucho más que hablar con ‘e’, qué es ser no binarie" por Marina Prats (HuffingtonPost.Es); "No nos quitarán la risa" por Lucas Garófalo (Vice.com); "El Primer Comedor Comunitario LGBTQ de la Ciudad de México" por Delilah Friedler, fotos de Luis Pimental (Vice.com); "Por qué los bisexuales, el colectivo no heterosexual más numeroso de España, siguen siendo invisibles en televisión" por Héctor Llanos Martínez (ElPaís.com) | Outstanding Spanish-Language Online Journalism – Video or Multimedia: "Las abuelas trans buscan dignificar su vejez" por Liliana Rosas y Silvana Flores (ReporteIndigo.com); "Un hogar para las mujeres trans en México" por Gladys Serrano (ElPaís.com); "¿Al clóset? ni pa’ coger impulso: Carolina Giraldo, congresista bisexual” por Mariana Escobar Bernoske (ElEspectador.com); "La comunidad trans recibe atención médica de calidad y con calidez, en la USIPT" por Jorge Ángel Pablo Garcia y Tania Molina Ramírez (Jornada.com.mx); "Migrantes Trans buscan una nueva vida en Estados Unidos" por Alma Paola Wong (Milenio.com) |

=== Special recognition ===
| Special Recognition: Alejandra Caraballo; Drag Queen Story Hour; Jerrod Carmichael's Rothaniel (HBO); The Lesbian Bar Project; Letters4TransKids | Special Recognition (Spanish-Language): En Sus Palabras (TelevisaUnivision) |

- Barbara Gittings Award for Excellence in LGBTQ Media: Los Angeles Blade and The Washington Blade
- GLAAD Excellence in Media Award: Maren Morris

== See also ==
- List of LGBT-related awards
- 1st Rainbow Awards
