= GLAAD Media Award for Outstanding Reality Program =

Annual US media award

The GLAAD Media Award for Outstanding Reality Program is one of the annual GLAAD Media Awards which is offered to the best LGBT-related television series. Starting during their 34th annual awards, the Outstanding Reality Program award was split into categories: Outstanding Reality Program and Outstanding Reality Competition Program.

== Winners and nominations ==
=== 2000s ===
Year	Program	Network
2004
2004	Queer Eye for the Straight Guy	Bravo
2004	The Amazing Race 4	CBS
2004	America's Next Top Model	UPN
2004	Boy Meets Boy	Bravo
2004	Real World/Road Rules Challenge: The Gauntlet	MTV
2005
2005	Queer Eye for the Straight Guy	Bravo
2005	The Real World: Philadelphia	MTV
2005	American Candidate	Showtime
2005	Big Brother 5	CBS
2005	Survivor: Vanuatu	CBS
2006
2006	30 Days ("Straight/Gay")	FX
2006	The Amazing Race 7	CBS
2006	America's Next Top Model 5	UPN
2006	Queer Eye	Bravo
2006	Wife Swap ("Boone Luffey/Gillespie")	ABC
2007
2007	Project Runway	Bravo
2007	The Amazing Race 10	CBS
2007	Big Brother: All-Stars	CBS
2007	Queer Eye	Bravo
2007	Work Out	Bravo
2008
2008	Kathy Griffin: My Life on the D-List	Bravo
2008	Project Runway	Bravo
2008	Trading Spouses ("Chase/Lane")	FOX
2008	Who Wants to Be a Superhero?	Sci-Fi Channel
2008	Work Out	Bravo
2009
2009	I Want to Work for Diddy	VH1
2009	Transamerican Love Story	LOGO TV

=== 2010s ===
Year	Program	Network
2010
2010	RuPaul’s Drag Race	LOGO TV
2010	The Amazing Race 15	CBS
2010	Kathy Griffin: My Life on the D-List	Bravo
2010	Making His Band	MTV
2010	The Real World: Brooklyn	MTV
2011
2011	Project Runway	Lifetime
2011	The Fabulous Beekman Boys	Planet Green
2011	Girls Who Like Boys Who Like Boys	Sundance Channel
2011	Top Chef: Just Desserts	Bravo
2011	TRANSform Me	VH1
2012
2012	Dancing With the Stars	ABC
2012	Girls Who Like Boys Who Like Boys	Sundance Channel
2012	The Glee Project	Oxygen
2012	The Real L Word	Showtime
2012	The Voice	NBC
2013
2013	The Amazing Race	CBS
2013	Here Comes Honey Boo Boo ("It Is What It Is")	TLC
2013	Pregnant in Heels ("Welcome to Hollywood!")	Bravo
2013	Small Town Security	AMC
2013	The Real L Word	Showtime
2014
2014	Big Freedia: Queen of Bounce	Fuse
2014	Cyndi Lauper: Still So Unusual	We TV
2014	Dream School	SundanceTV
2014	Project Runway	Lifetime
2014	Small Town Security	AMC
2015
2015	R&B Divas: Atlanta	TV One
2015	B.O.R.N. to Style	FYI
2015	Big Freedia: Queen of Bounce	Fuse
2015	Make or Break: The Linda Perry Project	VH1
2015	Survivor: San Juan del Sur	CBS
2016
2016	I Am Cait	E!
2016	I Am Jazz	TLC
2016	New Girls on the Block	Discovery Life
2016	The Prancing Elites Project	Oxygen
2016	Transcendent	Fuse
2018
2018	Strut	Oxygen
2018	Gaycation with Elliot Page^{[A]}	Viceland
2018	I Am Cait	E!
2018	I Am Jazz	TLC
2018	The Prancing Elites Project	Oxygen
2018
2018	Survivor: Game Changers	CBS
2018	Gaycation with Elliot Page^{[A]}	Viceland
2018	I Am Jazz	TLC
2018	The Voice	NBC
2019
2019	Queer Eye	Netflix
2019	American Idol	ABC
2019	I Am Jazz	TLC
2019	Love & Hip Hop	VH1
2019	RuPaul's Drag Race	VH1

=== 2020s ===
==== Reality Program ====
Year	Program	Network
2020
2020	Are You the One? Come One Come All	MTV
2020	Bachelor in Paradise	ABC
2020	I Am Jazz	TLC
2020	Queer Eye	Netflix
2020	RuPaul's Drag Race	VH1
2021
2021	We're Here	HBO
2021	Deaf U	Netflix
2021	Legendary	HBO Max
2021	Queer Eye	Netflix
2021	RuPaul's Drag Race	VH1
2022
2022	RuPaul's Drag Race	VH1
2022	We're Here	HBO
2022	12 Dates of Christmas	HBO Max
2022	Dancing with the Stars	ABC
2022	Family Karma	Bravo
2022	I Am Jazz	TLC
2022	Legendary	HBO Max
2022	MTV's Following: Bretman Rock	MTV
2022	Queer Eye	Netflix
2022	The Voice	NBC
2023
2023	We're Here	HBO
2023	Bargain Block	HGTV
2023	The Come Up	Freeform
2023	Family Karma	Bravo
2023	Generation Drag	Discovery+
2023	Getting Curious with Jonathan Van Ness	Netflix
2023	Mathis Family Matters	E!
2023	The Real World Homecoming: New Orleans	Paramount+
2023	Southern Hospitality	Bravo
2023	Trixie Motel	Discovery+
2024
2024	Family Karma	Bravo
2024	Bargain Block	HGTV
2024	I Am Jazz	TLC
2024	Living for the Dead	Hulu
2024	Queer Eye	Netflix
2024	The Real Housewives of New York City	Bravo
2024	Selling Sunset	Netflix
2024	Swiping America	Max
2024	TRANSworld Atlanta	Tubi
2024	The Ultimatum: Queer Love	Netflix
2025
2025	The Real Housewives of New York City	Bravo
2025	Bargain Block	HGTV
2025	Big Freedia Means Business	Fuse
2025	The Boyfriend	Netflix
2025	Queer Eye	Netflix
2025	Selling Sunset	Netflix
2025	Southern Charm	Bravo
2025	Wayne Brady: The Family Remix	Freeform
2025	We're Here	HBO
2025	Wiggin' Out with Tokyo Stylez	We TV

==== Reality Competition Program ====
Year	Program	Network
2023
2023	Dancing with the Stars	DIsney+
2023	Legendary	HBO Max
2023	Lizzo's Watch Out for the Big Grrrls	Prime Video
2023	RuPaul's Drag Race	VH1
2023	So You Think You Can Dance	FOX
2023	The Big Brunch	HBO Max
2023	The Voice	NBC
2023	Top Chef	Bravo
2023	Upcycle Nation	Fuse
2023	Worst Cooks in America	Food Network
2024
2024	RuPaul's Drag Race	MTV
2024	Drag Me to Dinner	Hulu
2024	Love Trip: Paris	Freeform
2024	My Kind of Country	AppleTV+
2024	Next in Fashion	Netflix
2024	Project Runway	Bravo
2024	Survivor	CBS
2024	The Boulet Brothers' Dragula	Shudder
2024	The Challenge: Battle for a New Champion	MTV
2024	The Voice	NBC
2025
2025	RuPaul's Drag Race	MTV
2025	The Amazing Race	CBS
2025	The Boulet Brothers’ Dragula	Shudder/AMC+
2025	The Challenge 40: Battle of the Eras	MTV
2025	Finding Mr. Christmas	Hallmark+
2025	Hell’s Kitchen: Head Chef’s Only	Fox
2025	I Kissed a Boy	Hulu
2025	I Kissed a Girl	Hulu
2025	Top Chef	Bravo
2025	The Voice	NBC

== Programs with multiple awards ==
3 wins

- RuPaul's Drag Race

2 wins

- Dancing with the Stars
- Project Runway
- Queer Eye for the Straight Guy (consecutive)
- We're Here (consecutive)

== Programs with multiple nominations ==
7 nominations

- RuPaul's Drag Race

6 nominations

- I Am Jazz

5 nominations

- The Amazing Race
- The Voice
- Project Runway

4 nominations

- Queer Eye
- Queer Eye for the Straight Guy
- Survivor

3 nominations

- Legendary
- The Real World

2 nominations

- Big Brother
- Big Freedia: Queen of Bounce
- Gaycation
- Girls Who Like Boys Who Like Boys Sundance Channel
- I Am Cait
- Kathy Griffin: My Life on the D-List
- Small Town Security
- The Prancing Elites Project
- The Real L World
- We're Here
- Work Out

== Notes ==
A: Elliot Page was nominated before his gender transition in 2020.
