= GLAAD Media Award for Outstanding Podcast =

LGBTQ-themed media award

The GLAAD Media Award for Outstanding Podcast is an annual award that honors audio podcasts for excellence in the depiction of LGBT (lesbian, gay, bisexual, and transgender) news and commentary. It is one of several categories of the annual GLAAD Media Awards, which are presented by GLAAD—an American non-governmental media monitoring organization founded in 1985—at ceremonies in New York City and Los Angeles between March and May.

The award was first given in 2023 in a tie to the podcasts Sibling Rivalry and TransLash Podcast with Imara Jones.

== List ==
Award year	Publication	Production company	Ref(s).
2023 (34th)	Sibling Rivalry‡	Studio71	
2023 (34th)	TransLash Podcast with Imara Jones‡	TransLash Media	
2023 (34th)	The Bald and the Beautiful with Trixie and Katya	Studio71	
2023 (34th)	In the Deep: Stories that Shape Us	iHeartMedia	
2023 (34th)	Las Culturistas with Matt Rogers and Bowen Yang	iHeartMedia/Big Money Players	
2023 (34th)	Life Out Loud with LZ Granderson	ABC News	
2023 (34th)	LGBTQ&A	Jeffrey Masters/The Advocate	
2023 (34th)	Pridecast	iHeartMedia	
2023 (34th)	V Interesting	Lemonada Media	
2023 (34th)	Yaas Jesus!	Daniel Franzese Media	
2024 (35th)	Las Culturistas with Matt Rogers and Bowen Yang	iHeartMedia/Big Money Players	
2024 (35th)	Finding Fire Island	Broadway Podcast Network	
2024 (35th)	Gay and Afraid with Eric Sedeño	Past Your Bedtime	
2024 (35th)	NPR's Embedded	NPR	
2024 (35th)	Queen of Hearts	Wondery	
2024 (35th)	Rooted Recovery Stories	Promises Behavioral Health	
2024 (35th)	Sibling Rivalry	Studio71	
2024 (35th)	That Conversation With Tarek Ali	Buzz Sprout	
2024 (35th)	This Queer Book Saved My Life	This Queer Book Productions, LLC	
2024 (35th)	TransLash	TransLash Media	
2025 (36th)	Baby, This is Keke Palmer	Wondery	
2025 (36th)	But We Loved	iHeartMedia	
2025 (36th)	Las Culturistas with Matt Rogers and Bowen Yang	iHeartMedia/Big Money Players	
2025 (36th)	Made it Out	Made It Out Media	
2025 (36th)	Queer West	Audible	
2025 (36th)	Rooted Recovery Stories	Promises Behavioral Health/The Cast Collective	
2025 (36th)	"The Science Of Transgender Healthcare, Puberty Blockers, & Conversion Therapy with Dr. Jack Turban" The Checkup with Dr. Mike	DM Operations Inc.	
2025 (36th)	Sibling Rivalry	Studio71	
2025 (36th)	Surface Level		
2025 (36th)	Tres Leches		
2026 (37th)	The Bald and the Beautiful with Trixie and Katya	Studio71	
2026 (37th)	Las Culturistas with Matt Rogers and Bowen Yang	iHeartMedia/Big Money Players	
2026 (37th)	The Daily Beans Podcast	MSW Media	
2026 (37th)	Handsome Podcast	Headgum	
2026 (37th)	Outlaws with TS Madison	iHeartMedia	
2026 (37th)	The Read	Loud Speakers Network	
2026 (37th)	Shut Up Evan	Acast	
2026 (37th)	So True with Caleb Hearon	Wave	
2026 (37th)	Tactful Pettiness	PodcastOne	
2026 (37th)	We Can Do Hard Things	Audacy	
