= 35th GLAAD Media Awards =

LGBT award show

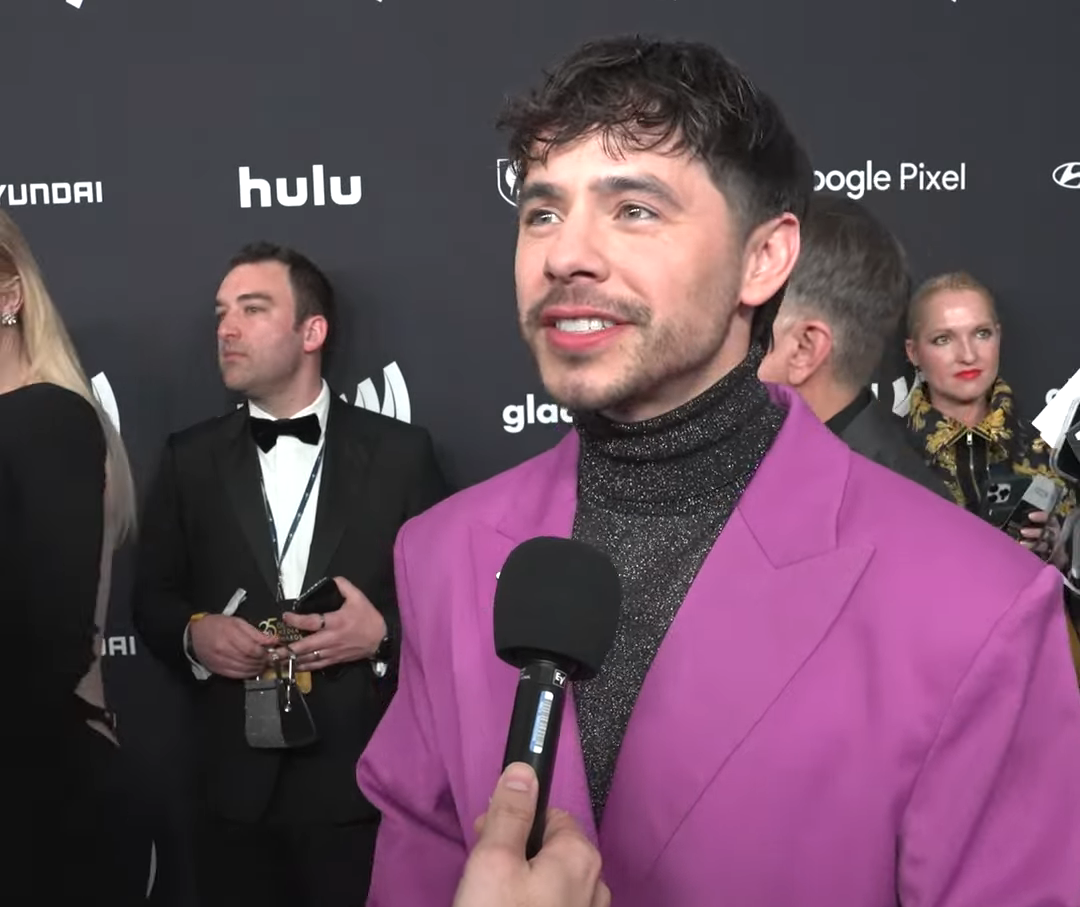
- David Archuleta at the 35th GLAAD Media Awards
- Date: March 14, 2024; May 11, 2024
- Location: The Beverly Hilton (Beverly Hills, California); New York Hilton Midtown (New York, New York)
- Country: United States

The 35th GLAAD Media Awards was the 2024 annual presentation of the GLAAD Media Awards by GLAAD honoring 2023 films, television shows, video games, musicians and works of journalism that fairly, accurately and inclusively represent the LGBT community and issues relevant to the community.

As in previous years, the awards was presented in two groups at two separate ceremonies. For this awards edition, the first took place on March 14, 2024, in Beverly Hills, California, while the second took place on May 11, 2024, in New York City. Special recognition was given to Renaissance: A Film by Beyonce, The Dads, Enamorándonos, Drag Latina and Wendy, perdida pero famosa.

== Winners and nominees ==
The eligibility period for the 35th GLAAD Media Awards ran from January 1, 2023, to December 31, 2023. All nominees are listed below, and the winners are listed in bold.

=== Film ===
**Outstanding Film – Wide Release**: **Bottoms (Metro-Goldwyn-Mayer)**; All of Us Strangers (Searchlight Pictures); American Fiction (Amazon MGM Studios); Anyone but You (Columbia Pictures); The Blackening (Lions Gate Films); The Color Purple (Warner Bros.); It's a Wonderful Knife (RLJE Films); Knock at the Cabin (Universal Pictures); Moving On (Roadside Attractions); Shortcomings (Sony Pictures Classics)	**Outstanding Film – Limited Release**: **Monica (IFC Films)**; Aristotle and Dante Discover the Secrets of the Universe (Blue Fox Entertainment); The Blue Caftan (Strand Releasing); Blue Jean (Magnolia Pictures); How to Blow Up a Pipeline (Neon); Joyland (Oscilloscope); L’immensità (Music Box Films); Our Son (Vertical Entertainment); Passages (Mubi); Summoning Sylvia (The Horror Collective)	**Outstanding Film – Streaming or TV**: **Rustin (Netflix)**; Cassandro (Prime Video); Christmas on Cherry Lane (Hallmark Channel); Friends & Family Christmas (Hallmark); Frybread Face and Me (Array Releasing); Nuovo Olimpo (Netflix); Nyad (Netflix); Red, White & Royal Blue (Amazon Prime Video); Runs in the Family (Indigenous Film Distribution); You’re Not Supposed to Be Here (Lifetime Television)

=== Television ===
**Outstanding New TV Series**: **The Last of Us (HBO)**; The Buccaneers (Apple TV+); Class (Netflix); Culprits (Hulu); Deadloch (Prime Video); Everything Now (Netflix); Found (NBC); Grease: Rise of the Pink Ladies (Paramount+); The Other Black Girl (Hulu); Tore (Netflix)	**Outstanding Limited or Anthology Series**: **Fellow Travelers (Showtime)**; Black Cake (Hulu); Bodies (Netflix); The Confessions of Frannie Langton (Britbox); The Fall of the House of Usher (Netflix); The Full Monty (FX on Hulu); The Lost Flowers of Alice Hart (Prime Video); Queen Charlotte: A Bridgerton Story (Netflix); Scott Pilgrim Takes Off (Netflix); Transatlantic (Netflix)
**Outstanding Comedy Series**: **Ted Lasso (Apple TV+)**; And Just Like That... (Max); Good Omens (Prime Video); Harlem (Prime Video); Harley Quinn (HBO Max); Our Flag Means Death (Max); Sex Education (Netflix); Somebody Somewhere (HBO); What We Do in the Shadows (FX); With Love (Prime Video)	**Outstanding Drama Series**: **Yellowjackets (Showtime)**; 9-1-1: Lone Star (Fox); The Chi (Showtime); Chucky (Syfy/USA Network); Doctor Who (Disney+); Good Trouble (Freeform); Grey's Anatomy (ABC); Quantum Leap (NBC); Riverdale (The CW); Station 19 (ABC)
**Outstanding Reality Program**: **Family Karma (Bravo)**; Bargain Block (HGTV); I Am Jazz (TLC); Living for the Dead (Hulu); Queer Eye (Netflix); Real Housewives of New York City (Bravo); Selling Sunset (Netflix); Swiping America (Max); TRANSworld Atlanta (Tubi); The Ultimatum: Queer Love (Netflix)	**Outstanding Reality Competition Program**: **RuPaul's Drag Race (MTV)**; The Boulet Brothers' Dragula (Shudder/AMC+); The Challenge: Battle for a New Champion (MTV); Drag Me to Dinner (Hulu); Love Trip: Paris (Freeform); My Kind of Country (Apple TV+); Next in Fashion (Netflix); Project Runway (Bravo); Survivor (CBS); The Voice (NBC)
**Outstanding Documentary**: **Beyond the Aggressives: 25 Years Later (MTV Documentary Films)**; **Kokomo City (Magnolia Pictures)**; **The Stroll (HBO)**; Eldorado: Everything the Nazis Hate (Netflix); Every Body (Focus Features); Little Richard: I Am Everything (Magnolia Pictures); Orlando, My Political Biography (Janus Films); Rainbow Rishta (Prime Video); Rock Hudson: All That Heaven Allowed (HBO Documentary Films); "UYRA – The Rising Forest" POV (PBS)	**Outstanding Variety or Talk Show Episode**: **"Jennifer Hudson surprises HIV Activist with $10,000" The Jennifer Hudson Show (syndicated)**; "Certainty" Turning the Tables with Robin Roberts (Disney+); "Chaos, Law, and Order" The Problem with Jon Stewart (Apple TV+); "Cynthia Nixon and Kim Petras" Watch What Happens Live with Andy Cohen (Bravo); “"Dulcé Sloan & Sasha Colby Talk What It Means to Be A Happy Trans Person" The Daily Show (Comedy Central); "Elliot Page Opens Up In New Memoir: 'It Felt Like The Right Time'" The View (ABC); "The Hardest Fight Is the Fight Against Status Quo" The Conversations Project (Hulu); "I'm Not Just Gay, I'm Your Son" Karamo (syndicated); "Trace Lysette & Patricia Clarkson, Laverne Cox" The Kelly Clarkson Show (syndicated); "Unapologetically Me" Tamron Hall (syndicated)

Children's Programming

**Outstanding Children's Programming**: **"Blue River Wedding" – Ada Twist: Scientist (Netflix)**; "Any Way You Slice It" – Strawberry Shortcake: Berry in the Big City (Netflix); Bossy Bear (Nick Jr.); Firebuds (Disney Junior); Monster High (Nickelodeon); Pinecone & Pony (Apple TV+); Princess Power (Netflix); Ridley Jones (Netflix); Summer Camp Island (Cartoon Network); Work It Out Wombats! (PBS Kids)	**Outstanding Kids and Family Programming - Live Action**: **Heartstopper (Netflix)**; High School Musical: The Musical: The Series (Disney+); Jane (AppleTV+); Power Rangers Cosmic Fury (Netflix); XO, Kitty (Netflix)	**Outstanding Kids and Family Programming - Animated**: **Hailey's On It! (Disney Channel)**; Adventure Time: Fionna and Cake (Max); Craig of the Creek (Cartoon Network); The Dragon Prince (Netflix); The Ghost and Molly McGee (Disney Channel); The Loud House (Nickelodeon); Moon Girl and Devil Dinosaur (Disney Channel); Nimona (Netflix); The Proud Family: Louder and Prouder (Disney+); Transformers: EarthSpark (Paramount+)

=== Other ===
**Outstanding Broadway Production**: **Melissa Etheridge: My Window by Melissa Etheridge**; Fat Ham by James Ijames; How to Dance in Ohio by Jacob Yandura and Rebekah Greer Melocik; Once Upon a One More Time by Jon Hartmere; The Sign in Sidney Brustein's Window by Lorraine Hansberry	**Outstanding Video Game**: **Baldur's Gate 3 (Larian Studios)**; Goodbye Volcano High (KO_OP); Horizon Forbidden West: Burning Shores (Guerrilla Games / Sony Interactive Entertainment; Little Goody Two Shoes (AstralShift / Square Enix); Overwatch 2 (Blizzard Entertainment); Stray Gods: The Roleplaying Musical (Summerfall Studios / Humble Games); Tchia (Awaceb / Kepler Interactive); Thirsty Suitors (Outerloop Games / Annapurna Interactive); This Bed We Made (Lowbirth Games); Too Hot to Handle 2 (Nanobit / Netflix Games)
**Outstanding Comic Book**: **Star Wars: Doctor Aphra by Alyssa Wong (Marvel Comics)**; Adventures of Superman: Jon Kent by Tom Taylor (DC Comics); Betsy Braddock: Captain Britain by Tini Howard (Marvel Comics); Hawkgirl by Jadzia Axelrod (DC Comics); Killer Queens 2 by David M. Booher (Dark Horse Comics); The Neighbors by Jude Ellison S. Doyle (BOOM! Studios); New Mutants Lethal Legion by Charlie Jane Anders (Marvel Comics); The Oddly Pedestrian Life of Christopher Chaos by Tate Brombal based on an idea by James Tynion IV (Dark Horse Comics); Poison Ivy by G. Willow Wilson (DC Comics); Tim Drake: Robin by Meghan Fitzmartin (DC Comics)	**Outstanding Graphic Novel/Anthology**: **Four-Color Heroes by Richard Fairgray (Fanbase Press)**; Blackward by Lawrence Lindell (Drawn & Quarterly); Carmilla: The First Vampire by Amy Chu (Berger Books / Dark Horse Comics); Cosmoknights (Book Two) by Hannah Templer (Top Shelf Productions); Heartstopper Vol. 5 by Alice Oseman (Graphix / Scholastic); Light Carries On by Ray Nadine (Dark Horse Books); Northranger by Rey Terciero (HarperAlley); Parallel by Matthias Lehmann (Oni Press); Roaming by Jillian Tamaki and Mariko Tamaki (Drawn & Quarterly); Us by Sara Soler (Dark Horse Books)
**Outstanding Music Artist**: **Reneé Rapp – Snow Angel (Interscope)**; Billy Porter – Black Mona Lisa (Island UK / Republic Records); boygenius – The Record (Interscope); Brandy Clark – Brandy Clark (Warner; Janelle Monae – The Age of Pleasure (Atlantic Records); Kim Petras – Feed the Beast and Problematique (Amigo / Republic Records); Miley Cyrus – Endless Summer Vacation (Columbia Records); Sam Smith – Gloria (Capitol Records); Troye Sivan – Something to Give Each Other (EMI Australia / Capitol Records); Victoria Monet – JAGUAR II (Lovett Music / RCA Records)	**Outstanding Breakthrough Music Artist**: **David Archuleta (Archie Music)**; Chappell Roan (Atlantic Records / Island Records); Fancy Hagood (Fancy Hagood Enterprises); G FLIP (Future Classic); Ice Spice (10K Projects / Capitol Records); Iniko (Columbia Records); Jade LeMac (Artista Records); The Scarlet Opera (Perta / Silent Records); Slayyyter (FADER Label); UMI (Keep Cool / RCA)
**Outstanding Blog**: **Erin in the Morning**; Charlotte's Web Thoughts; Holy Bullies and Headless Monsters; LawDork; Mombian; Pittsburgh Lesbian Correspondents; The Queer Review; The Randy Report; The Reckoning; The Rot Spot	**Outstanding Podcast**: **Las Culturistas (iHeart)**; Finding Fire Island (Broadway Podcast Network); Gay and Afraid with Eric Sedeño (Past Your Bedtime); NPR's Embedded (NPR); Queen of Hearts (Wondery); Rooted Recovery Stories (Promises Behavioral Health); Sibling Rivalry (Studio 71); That Conversation With Tarek Ali (Buzz Sprout); This Queer Book Saved My Life (This Queer Book Productions, LLC); TransLash (TransLash Media)

=== Journalism ===
**Outstanding TV Journalism Segment**: **"New York City Gay Bar Deaths Classified as Homicides" (NBC News Now)**; "11th Hour: Transgender Athletes and What People Don't Understand" – The 11th Hour (MSNBC); "19-Year-Old Designer CJ King Gets Second Chance to Walk the Runway" – GMA3 (ABC); "The All in Y'all" (KEYE-TV CBS Austin); "Anti-LGBTQ+ Law in Uganda that Threatens the Death Penalty Sparks International Outcry" – PBS Newshour (PBS); "Bringing Queer Joy into the World of Hip-Hop" – ABC News Live Prime (ABC News Live); "Des Moines LGBTQ Community Hosts First-Ever 'People's Pride'" (WOI-TV Local 5 Des Moines); "Geena Rocero Talks About Her New Memoir 'Horse Barbie' and the Power of Living Unapologetically" – CBS Mornings (CBS); "How Eco-Drag Queen Pattie Gonia Defines What It Means to Fight for the Environment" – Nightline (ABC); "One-on-One with the President of the American Medical Association (AMA)" – CBS Evening News with Norah O'Donnell (CBS)	**Outstanding TV Journalism – Long-Form**: "Beyond Limits: Who I Am" – CBS Sports (CBS); "CBS Reports: A Nation in Transition" – CBS News (CBS); "Club Q One Year Later" (KKTV CBS 11 Colorado); "Freedom to Exist" – Soul of a Nation (ABC); "It's Ok To Ask Questions – Pidgeon Pagonis" (WMAQ-TV NBC 5 Chicago); "Marty's Place: Where Hope Lives" (+Life Media with KGO-TV & ABC Localish); **"Our America: Who I'm Meant to Be – Episode 3" (ABC Owned Television Stations)**; "Proud Voices: A NY1 Special" (Spectrum News NY1); "Serving in Secret: Love, Country and 'Dont Ask Don't Tell'" (MSNBC); "VICE Special Report – Out Loud // Big Freedia Presents: Young Queer Artists To Look Out For" (Vice News)
**Outstanding Live TV Journalism – Segment or Special**: "Capehart on SCOTUS rulings: 'My Possibilities are Up to Them, Not Up to Me'" – The Last Word (MSNBC); "CNN's Anderson Cooper Speaks With Lauri Carleton's Daughter, Ari Carleton, About Her Mother's Legacy" – Anderson Cooper 360 (CNN); "Flipping the Script: Live Interviews on LGBTQ+ Community" – Morning News NOW (NBC News Now); "Gio Benitez Interviews Sasha Velour on Her Book and the Climate of Drag in America" – Good Morning America (ABC); **"Indiana Students Put on LGBTQ-Themed Play Themselves After it's Canceled By the School" – Yasmin Vossoughian Reports (MSNBC)**; "José Díaz-Balart Reports: A Texas Mother's Fight: the Case for Gender-Affirming Care" – José Díaz-Balart Reports (MSNBC); "One-on-One with Eureka O'Hara" – The Reid Out (MSNBC); "Pride Across America" (ABC News Live); "TikTok Sensations 'The Old Gays' Talk About How They Became Friends and Their New Docuseries" – Today with Hoda & Jenna (NBC); "Two Anti-LGBTQ Bills Advance to Louisiana House" Breakdown (WWL-TV CBS New Orleans)
**Outstanding Print Article**: **"As Drag Bans Proliferate, Maren Morris Goes Deep With Drag's Biggest Stars on Why the Show Must Go On" by Stephen Daw (Billboard)**; "Black Queer History is American History" by Myeshia Price (TIME); "'But Most of All I'm Human': These 3 Transgender Teens Prove Identity Stretches Beyond One Label" by Susan Miller (USA Today); "The Dancer" by Matt Kemper (The Atlanta-Journal Constitution); "Heroism Overpowers Hate" by John Sotomayor (Embrace Magazine); "Kim Petras Is Breaking the Mold" by Jeff Nelson (People); "Pop Icons Are 'Mothers' Now. The LGBTQ Ballroom Scene Wants Credit." by Samantha Cherry (The Washington Post); "Stop Bad Hair and Uglier Legislation (The New Classics)" by Karen Giberson (AC Magazine); "Transgender Youth: 'Forced Outing' Bills Make Schools Unsafe" by Hannah Schoenbaum and Sean Murphy (AP); "We Have the Tools to Stop HIV. So Why Is It Still Spreading?" by LZ Granderson (Los Angeles Times)	**Outstanding Magazine Overall Coverage**: **Out**; The Advocate; Billboard; People; Variety
**Outstanding Online Journalism Article**: **"The AP Interview: Pope Francis Says Homosexuality Not a Crime" by Nicole Winifield (Associated Press)**; "Book Banners Came for This Colorado Town. They Didn't Anticipate Resistance." By Jeff Fuentes Gleghorn (LGBTQNation.com); "Evidence Undermines 'Rapid Onset Gender Dysphoria' Claims" by Timmy Broderick (ScientificAmerican.com); "From Drag Bans to Sports Restrictions, 75 Anti-LGBTQ Bills Have Become Law in 2023" by Jo Yurcaba (NBCNews.com); "How the Latinx Drag Queens of Brooklyn Are Finding Freedom through Their Cultures" by Juan De Dios Sanchez Jurado (TeenVogue.com); "Pedro Zamora, 'Real World' Star Who Died of AIDS, 'Humanized the Disease for a Generation,' Say Activists" by David Artavia (Yahoo.com); "Pride Month Feels Different As Threats, Fear of Violence Grows" by Brooke Migdon (TheHill.com); "Some Trans Kids Are Being Forced to Flee America for Their Safety" by Nico Lang (HuffPost.com); "Stochastic Terrorism: Links between the GOP, Right-Wing Influencers & Neo-Nazi Violence" by Christopher Wiggins (Advocate.com); "What Does Queer Gen Z Want on TV? Everything under the Rainbow" by Jude Cramer (INTOMore.com)	**Outstanding Online Journalism – Video or Multimedia**: **"7 Remarkable Trans Elders Share Lessons for the Next Generation" (them.us)**; "Brave Spaces" (PBS.org); "CANS Can't Stand" (NewYorker.com); "Club Q: Stronger Together" (NFL.com); "'I've Always Known I Was Different': Four Trans People Share Their Stories" (WashingtonPost.com); "Michaela Jaé Rodriguez Calls Out the New York Times' Anti-Trans Coverage & Advice for Trans Youth" (Variety.com); "Moving Isa" (Insider.com); "People Come Out to Their Parents | Truth or Drink" (Cut.com); "Protecting Pride: Resilience after Tragedy – Club Q Survivors Fight to Project Their Community" (GoodMorningAmerica.com); "Transnational" (Vice.com)

=== Spanish Language ===
**Outstanding Spanish-Language Scripted Television Series**: **Las noches de Tefía (Atresplayer)**; 4 estrellas (RTVE Play); Las pelotaris 1926 (Vix); Sagrada familia (Netflix); Sin huellas (Amazon Prime Video)	**Outstanding Spanish-Language TV Journalism**: **"Adolescentes trans relatan su experiencia" – Noticiero Telemundo (Telemundo)**

=== Special recognition ===
**Special Recognition**: The Dads (Netflix); +Life Media; Love in Gravity; Relighting Candles (Hulu); Renaissance: A Film by Beyonce (AMC Theatres); The Tennessee Holler; Yes I Am: The Ric Weiland Story	**Special Recognition (Spanish-Language)**: Enamorándonos (Univision); El Sabor de Navidad (Vix); Drag Latina (Revry / LATV); Wendy, perdida pero famosa (Vix)

- GLAAD Vito Russo Award - Orville Peck

== See also ==
- List of LGBTQ-related awards
- 2nd Rainbow Awards
