= Golden Gate Award =

Golden Gate Award may refer to:

- GLAAD Golden Gate Award, a special award presented by the Gay & Lesbian Alliance Against Defamation
- Golden Gate Award (film), a film award at the San Francisco International Film Festival
