= GLAAD Media Award for Outstanding Children's Programming =

Annual US television award

The GLAAD Media Award for Outstanding Children's Programming is an annual award that honors younger children's programming for excellence in the treatment of LGBT (lesbian, gay, bisexual, and transgender) characters and themes. It is one of several categories of the annual GLAAD Media Awards, which are presented by GLAAD—an American non-governmental media monitoring organization—at ceremonies held primarily in New York City and Los Angeles between March and May. The award was first awarded in 2021 to the HBO Max series The Not-Too-Late Show with Elmo.

== Winners and nominations ==
Table key
‡	Indicates the winner

Award year	Program	Network	Ref(s).
2021 (32nd)	The Not-Too-Late Show with Elmo‡	HBO Max	
2021 (32nd)	"Challenge of the Senior Junior Woodchucks!" – DuckTales	Disney XD	
2021 (32nd)	"Dogbot" – Clifford the Big Red Dog	PBS Kids	
2021 (32nd)	"Nancy Plays Dress Up" – Fancy Nancy	Disney Junior	
2021 (32nd)	Summer Camp Island	HBO Max	
2022 (33rd)	"Family Day" – Sesame Street‡	HBO Max	
2022 (33rd)	"Berry Bounty Banquet - Part 2" – Strawberry Shortcake: Berry in the Big City	YouTube Kids	
2022 (33rd)	City of Ghosts	Netflix	
2022 (33rd)	"Gonzo-rella" – Muppet Babies	Disney Junior	
2022 (33rd)	"Joie de Jonathan" – Fancy Nancy	Disney Junior	
2022 (33rd)	Ridley Jones	Netflix	
2022 (33rd)	Rugrats	Paramount+	
2022 (33rd)	Summer Camp Island	Cartoon Network/HBO Max	
2022 (33rd)	We The People	Netflix	
2022 (33rd)	"Whatever Floats Your Float" – Madagascar: A Little Wild	Hulu/Peacock	
2023 (34th)	"Adoptasaurus Rex" – Dino Ranch‡	Disney Junior	
2023 (34th)	"Family Picnic" – Sesame Street	HBO Max	
2023 (34th)	Firebuds	Disney Junior	
2023 (34th)	"The Mint Gala" – Strawberry Shortcake: Berry in the Big City	Netflix	
2023 (34th)	Pinecone & Pony	Apple TV+	
2024 (35th)	"Blue River Wedding" – Ada Twist: Scientist‡	Netflix	
2024 (35th)	"Any Way You Slice It" – Strawberry Shortcake: Berry in the Big City	Netflix	
2024 (35th)	Bossy Bear	Nick Jr.	
2024 (35th)	Firebuds	Disney Junior	
2024 (35th)	Monster High	Nickelodeon	
2024 (35th)	Pinecone & Pony	Apple TV+	
2024 (35th)	Princess Power	Netflix	
2024 (35th)	Ridley Jones	Netflix	
2024 (35th)	Summer Camp Island	Cartoon Network	
2024 (35th)	Work It Out Wombats!	PBS Kids	
2025 (36th)	The Fairly OddParents: A New Wish	Nickelodeon	
2025 (36th)	“Aunt Praline’s Sweetie Pie” – Strawberry Shortcake: Berry in the Big City	Paramount+	
2025 (36th)	Firebuds	Disney Junior	
2025 (36th)	“I’m Pogey” Fraggle Rock: Back to the Rock	Apple TV+	
2025 (36th)	Let’s Go, Bananas!	Cartoonito	
2025 (36th)	Monster High	Nickelodeon	
2025 (36th)	“Our Family Musical” Sesame Street	HBO Max	
2025 (36th)	“Princess Royal Wedding” Princess Power	Netflix	
2025 (36th)	Star Wars: Young Jedi Adventures	Disney Jr. / Disney+	
2025 (36th)	Vida the Vet	Netflix	
2026 (37th)	Firebuds	Disney Jr.	
2026 (37th)	Be@rbrick	Apple TV+	
2026 (37th)	“Ghost Town” Mermicorno: Starfall	HBO Max	
2026 (37th)	“No Wrong Way to Be You” Sesame Street	HBO Max	
2026 (37th)	Star Wars: Young Jedi Adventures	Disney Jr. / Disney+	
