= GLAAD Media Award for Outstanding New TV Series =

LGBTQ-themed media award

- Awarded for: Excellence in depiction of the LGBTQ (lesbian, gay, bisexual, transgender, or queer) community in a television series in their first season
- Venue: Varies
- Country: United States
- Presented by: GLAAD
- First award: April 2, 2022; 4 years ago
- Currently held by: Heated Rivalry (2026)

The GLAAD Media Award for Outstanding New TV Series is an annual award that honors television series in their first season for excellence in the depiction of LGBTQ (lesbian, gay, bisexual, transgender, or queer) characters and themes. It is one of several categories of the annual GLAAD Media Awards, which are presented by GLAAD—an American non-governmental media monitoring organization founded in 1985, formerly called the Gay & Lesbian Alliance Against Defamation—at ceremonies in New York City and Los Angeles between March and May.

For a series to be eligible, it must be a scripted comedy or drama series in its first season that premiered in the United States during the eligibility period and include at least one LGBTQ character in a leading, supporting, or recurring capacity. The award may be accepted by the show's producers, writers, and/or actors. Series selected by GLAAD are evaluated based on four criteria: "Fair, Accurate, and Inclusive Representations" of the LGBTQ community, "Boldness and Originality" of the project, significant "Impact" on mainstream culture, and "Overall Quality" of the project. GLAAD monitors mainstream media to identify which series will be nominated, while also issuing a Call for Entries that encourages media outlets to submit programs for consideration. In order for series created by and for LGBTQ audiences to be considered for nomination, they must be submitted after the Call for Entries. Winners are determined by a plurality vote by GLAAD staff and board, donors and volunteers, and selected media industry experts.

The award was first presented at the 33rd GLAAD Media Awards in 2022. As of 2026, the award has been presented to five television series. The inaugural recipient of the award was Hacks. The most recent recipient is Heated Rivalry, which was honored at the 37th GLAAD Media Awards in 2026.

== Winners and nominations ==
Table key
‡	Indicates the winner

2020s winners and nominees
Award year	Work	Network	Ref(s).
2022 (33rd)	Hacks ‡	HBO Max	
2022 (33rd)	4400	The CW	
2022 (33rd)	Chucky	Syfy/USA Network	
2022 (33rd)	Harlem	Prime Video	
2022 (33rd)	The Long Call	BritBox	
2022 (33rd)	The Sex Lives of College Girls	HBO Max	
2022 (33rd)	Sort Of	HBO Max	
2022 (33rd)	With Love	Prime Video	
2022 (33rd)	Y: The Last Man	FX	
2022 (33rd)	Yellowjackets	Showtime	
2023 (34th)	A League of Their Own ‡	Prime Video	
2023 (34th)	Heartbreak High	Netflix	
2023 (34th)	High School	Amazon Freevee	
2023 (34th)	Interview with the Vampire	AMC	
2023 (34th)	Our Flag Means Death	HBO Max	
2023 (34th)	Queer as Folk	Peacock	
2023 (34th)	The Rookie: Feds	ABC	
2023 (34th)	The Sandman	Netflix	
2023 (34th)	Somebody Somewhere	HBO	
2023 (34th)	Willow	Disney+	
2024 (35th)	The Last of Us ‡	HBO	
2024 (35th)	The Buccaneers	Apple TV+	
2024 (35th)	Class	Netflix	
2024 (35th)	Culprits	Hulu	
2024 (35th)	Deadloch	Prime Video	
2024 (35th)	Everything Now	Netflix	
2024 (35th)	Found	NBC	
2024 (35th)	Grease: Rise of the Pink Ladies	Paramount+	
2024 (35th)	The Other Black Girl	Hulu	
2024 (35th)	Tore	Netflix	
2025 (36th)	Agatha All Along ‡	Disney+	
2025 (36th)	Black Doves	Netflix	
2025 (36th)	Brilliant Minds	NBC	
2025 (36th)	Diarra from Detroit	BET+	
2025 (36th)	Fantasmas	HBO	
2025 (36th)	Hazbin Hotel	Prime Video	
2025 (36th)	How to Die Alone	Hulu	
2025 (36th)	Kaos	Netflix	
2025 (36th)	No Good Deed	Netflix	
2025 (36th)	Palm Royale	Apple TV+	
2026 (37th)	Heated Rivalry ‡	Crave/HBO Max	
2026 (37th)	Boots	Netflix	
2026 (37th)	Chad Powers	Hulu	
2026 (37th)	Clean Slate	Prime Video	
2026 (37th)	The Four Seasons	Netflix	
2026 (37th)	The Hunting Wives	Netflix	
2026 (37th)	I Love LA	HBO	
2026 (37th)	Long Story Short	Netflix	
2026 (37th)	Mid-Century Modern	Hulu	
2026 (37th)	Overcompensating	Prime Video	
2026 (37th)	Pluribus	Apple TV	
