= GLAAD Media Award for Outstanding Kids and Family Programming =

Award presented annually by GLAAD for youth-oriented programming

- Awarded for: Outstanding Kids and Family Programming
- Country: United States
- Presented by: GLAAD
- First award: April 12, 2018; 8 years ago
- Currently held by: Adventure Time: Fionna and Cake; XO, Kitty (2026)

The GLAAD Media Award for Outstanding Kids and Family Programming is an annual award that honors children's and family programming for excellence in the treatment of LGBT (lesbian, gay, bisexual, and transgender) characters and themes. It is one of several categories of the annual GLAAD Media Awards, which are presented by GLAAD—an American non-governmental media monitoring organization—at ceremonies held primarily in New York City and Los Angeles between March and May.

The award was first given at the 29th GLAAD Media Awards in 2018 to Andi Mack, a comedy-drama television series that aired on Disney Channel. Concerning the creation of this category, GLAAD CEO Sarah Kate Ellis stated that it was added to "raise the bar for current and future LGBTQ inclusion in this hugely popular and impactful genre", arguing about the importance of younger individuals, that are "coming out earlier and in greater numbers, [to] see their lives and experiences reflected in thoughtful, loving, and affirming ways". Throughout the award's history, there have only been two instances where a tie occurred, both between animated and live-action works: in 2020 where Hulu's The Bravest Knight and Disney+'s High School Musical: The Musical: The Series won, and again the following year with Hulu's First Day and Netflix's She-Ra and the Princesses of Power winning. At the 34th GLAAD Media Awards in 2023, the award was formally split into Animated and Live Action categories.

For a program to be eligible, it must be family-oriented and made for children, tweens, teenagers, and their parents. Furthermore, programs must include at least one LGBT character in a leading, supporting, or recurring capacity; in the absence of a regular LGBT character, the show must feature an LGBT-inclusive episode or story arc. Programs are judged based on the tone of the narrative and the "storytelling techniques required for the age of the intended audience". Children's and family programming selected by GLAAD are evaluated based on four criteria: "Fair, Accurate, and Inclusive Representations" of the LGBT community, "Boldness and Originality" of the project, significant "Impact" on mainstream culture, and "Overall Quality" of the project. GLAAD monitors mainstream media to identify which children's and family programs will be nominated, while also issuing a call for entries that encourages media outlets to submit youth-oriented programming for consideration. By contrast, in order for family programming created by and for LGBT audiences to be considered for nomination, they must be submitted after the call for entries. Winners are determined by a plurality vote by GLAAD staff and its board, Shareholders Circle members, (Note: The Shareholders Circle consists of individuals who have made a donation of $1,500 or more.) volunteers and affiliated individuals.

Since its inception, the award has been given to nine programs. At the 36th GLAAD Media Awards, Jurassic World: Chaos Theory won in the Animation category, with Heartstopper winning in the Live-Action category.

== Winners and nominations ==
Table key
‡	Indicates the winner

Winners and nominees
Award year	Program	Network	Ref(s).
2018 (29th)	Andi Mack ‡	Disney Channel	
2018 (29th)	Danger & Eggs: "Chosen Family"	Amazon Video	
2018 (29th)	Doc McStuffins: "The Emergency Plan"	Disney Channel	
2018 (29th)	The Loud House	Nickelodeon	
2018 (29th)	Steven Universe	Cartoon Network	
2019 (30th)	Steven Universe ‡	Cartoon Network	
2019 (30th)	Adventure Time	Cartoon Network	
2019 (30th)	Andi Mack	Disney Channel	
2019 (30th)	Anne with an E	Netflix	
2019 (30th)	She-Ra and the Princesses of Power	Netflix	
2020 (31st)	The Bravest Knight ‡	Hulu	
2020 (31st)	High School Musical: The Musical: The Series ‡	Disney+	
2020 (31st)	Andi Mack	Disney Channel	
2020 (31st)	Arthur: "Mr. Ratburn and the Special Someone"	PBS	
2020 (31st)	The Loud House	Nickelodeon	
2020 (31st)	Nella the Princess Knight: "A Tale of Two Nellas"	Nick Jr. Channel	
2020 (31st)	Rocko's Modern Life: Static Cling	Netflix	
2020 (31st)	She-Ra and the Princesses of Power	Netflix	
2020 (31st)	Steven Universe: The Movie	Cartoon Network	
2020 (31st)	Twelve Forever	Netflix	
2021 (32nd)	First Day ‡	Hulu	
2021 (32nd)	She-Ra and the Princesses of Power ‡	Netflix	
2021 (32nd)	Adventure Time: Distant Lands: "Obsidian"	HBO Max	
2021 (32nd)	The Baby-Sitters Club: "Mary Anne Saves the Day"	Netflix	
2021 (32nd)	Craig of the Creek	Cartoon Network	
2021 (32nd)	Diary of a Future President	Disney+	
2021 (32nd)	Kipo and the Age of Wonderbeasts	Netflix	
2021 (32nd)	The Loud House	Nickelodeon	
2021 (32nd)	The Owl House	Disney Channel	
2021 (32nd)	Steven Universe	Cartoon Network	
2022 (33rd)	Power Rangers Dino Fury ‡	Nickelodeon / Netflix	
2022 (33rd)	Amphibia	Disney Channel	
2022 (33rd)	The Baby-Sitters Club: "Claudia and the Sad Goodbye"	Netflix	
2022 (33rd)	Centaurworld	Netflix	
2022 (33rd)	Danger Force: "Manlee Men"	Nickelodeon	
2022 (33rd)	Diary of a Future President	Disney+	
2022 (33rd)	Doogie Kameāloha, M.D.	Disney+	
2022 (33rd)	High School Musical: The Musical: The Series	Disney+	
2022 (33rd)	The Loud House	Nickelodeon	
2022 (33rd)	The Owl House	Disney Channel	
2023 (34th)	Animated		
2023 (34th)	Dead End: Paranormal Park ‡	Netflix	
2023 (34th)	Amphibia	Disney Channel	
2023 (34th)	Battle Kitty	Netflix	
2023 (34th)	Big Nate	Nickelodeon	
2023 (34th)	Craig of the Creek	Cartoon Network	
2023 (34th)	The Dragon Prince	Netflix	
2023 (34th)	Jurassic World Camp Cretaceous	Netflix	
2023 (34th)	The Owl House	Disney Channel	
2023 (34th)	The Proud Family: Louder and Prouder	Disney+	
2023 (34th)	Trick or Treat Scooby-Doo!	Cartoon Network	
2023 (34th)	Live Action		
2023 (34th)	Heartstopper ‡	Netflix	
2023 (34th)	Better Nate Than Ever	Disney+	
2023 (34th)	First Day	Hulu	
2023 (34th)	High School Musical: The Musical: The Series	Disney+	
2023 (34th)	Monster High: The Movie	Nickelodeon / Paramount+	
2023 (34th)	Power Rangers Dino Fury	Netflix	
2023 (34th)	Raven's Home	Disney Channel	
2023 (34th)	Rebel Cheer Squad	Netflix	
2023 (34th)	Trevor: The Musical	Disney+	
2023 (34th)	Zombies 3	Disney+	
2024 (35th)	Animated		
2024 (35th)	Hailey's On It! ‡	Disney Channel	
2024 (35th)	Adventure Time: Fionna and Cake	Max	
2024 (35th)	Craig of the Creek	Cartoon Network	
2024 (35th)	The Dragon Prince	Netflix	
2024 (35th)	The Ghost and Molly McGee	Disney Channel	
2024 (35th)	The Loud House	Nickelodeon	
2024 (35th)	Moon Girl and Devil Dinosaur	Disney Channel	
2024 (35th)	Nimona	Netflix	
2024 (35th)	The Proud Family: Louder and Prouder	Disney+	
2024 (35th)	Transformers: EarthSpark	Paramount+	
2024 (35th)	Live Action		
2024 (35th)	Heartstopper‡	Netflix	
2024 (35th)	High School Musical: The Musical: The Series	Disney+	
2024 (35th)	Jane	Apple TV+	
2024 (35th)	Power Rangers Cosmic Fury	Netflix	
2024 (35th)	XO, Kitty	Netflix	
2025 (36th)	Animated		
2025 (36th)	Jurassic World: Chaos Theory ‡	Netflix	
2025 (36th)	The Bravest Knight	Hulu	
2025 (36th)	The Dragon Prince	Netflix	
2025 (36th)	Fright Krewe	(Hulu / Peacock)	
2025 (36th)	Kiff: The Haunting of Miss McGravy’s House	Disney Channel	
2025 (36th)	“I Wanna Dance with My Buddy” Hailey’s On It!	Disney Channel	
2025 (36th)	The Loud House	Nickelodeon	
2025 (36th)	Moon Girl and Devil Dinosaur	Disney Channel	
2025 (36th)	“Powerless” Monsters at Work	Disney Channel	
2025 (36th)	“Summer of Heart Eyes” Primos	Disney Channel	
2025 (36th)	Live Action		
2025 (36th)	Heartstopper ‡	Netflix	
2025 (36th)	Empire Waist	Blue Fox Entertainment	
2025 (36th)	“If You Love Me” Beyond Black Beauty	Amazon Prime Video	
2025 (36th)	Jane	Apple TV+	
2025 (36th)	“Louds in Love” The Really Loud House	Nickelodeon	
2026 (37th)	Animated		
2026 (37th)	Adventure Time: Fionna and Cake ‡	HBO Max	
2026 (37th)	The Bravest Knight	Hulu	
2026 (37th)	Jurassic World: Chaos Theory	Netflix	
2026 (37th)	Moon Girl and Devil Dinosaur	Disney Channel	
2026 (37th)	The Proud Family: Louder and Prouder	Disney+	
2026 (37th)	Live Action		
2026 (37th)	XO, Kitty ‡	Netflix	
2026 (37th)	Goosebumps: The Vanishing	Disney+/Hulu	
2026 (37th)	Jane	Apple TV	
2026 (37th)	School Spirits	Paramount+	
2026 (37th)	"Selamiut" Washington Black	Hulu	

== Multiple wins and nominations ==
=== Programs ===
The following programs received two or more Outstanding Kids and Family Programming awards:

Wins	Program
3	Heartstopper

The following programs received four or more Outstanding Kids and Family Programming nominations:

Nominations	Program
6	The Loud House
4	High School Musical: The Musical: The Series
3	Andi Mack
3	The Bravest Knight
3	Craig of the Creek
3	The Dragon Prince
3	Heartstopper
3	Jane
3	Moon Girl and Devil Dinosaur
3	The Owl House
3	The Proud Family: Louder and Prouder
3	She-Ra and the Princesses of Power
3	Steven Universe
2	Amphibia
2	The Babysitters Club
2	Diary of a Future President
2	First Day
2	Hailey’s On It!
2	Jurassic World: Chaos Theory
2	XO, Kitty

=== Networks ===
The following networks received two or more Outstanding Kids and Family Programming awards:

Wins	Format	Network
7	4 live action, 3 animated	Netflix
2	1 live action, 1 animated	Disney Channel
2	1 live action, 1 animated	Hulu

The following networks received four or more Outstanding Kids and Family Programming nominations:

Nominations	Format	Network
25	10 live action, 15 animated	Netflix
19	4 live action, 14 animated	Disney Channel
12	10 live action, 2 animated	Disney+
11	4 live action, 7 animated	Nickelodeon
9	9 animated	Cartoon Network
8	2 live action, 3 animated	Hulu
3	2 live action, 1 animated	Paramount+
3	3 live action	Apple TV+
3	3 animated	HBO Max/Max
2	1 live action, 1 animated	Amazon Video/Amazon Prime Video

== See also ==
- LGBTQ themes in Western animation
