= 36th GLAAD Media Awards =

LGBT award show

- Date: March 27, 2025
- Location: Los Angeles, California
- Country: United States

The 36th GLAAD Media Awards is the 2025 annual presentation of the GLAAD Media Awards by GLAAD honoring 2024 films, television shows, video games, musicians and works of journalism that fairly, accurately and inclusively represent the LGBT community and issues relevant to the community.

Unlike in previous years, the awards was presented in one ceremony on March 27, 2025, in Los Angeles, California, rather than two separate ceremonies in Beverly Hills, California and New York City. Special recognition was given to DRAG: The Musical, La Verdrag" (Canal Once), OUTLOUD, "Red Ink: A Tribute to Cecilia Gentili," The Stonewall National Monument Visitor Center, "The Q Agenda" (LatiNation), and the New York Liberty.

The category of "Outstanding Blog" was renamed as "Outstanding Independent Journalism" to expand eligibility to more digital news and commentary outlets covering LGBTQ issues.

== Winners and nominees ==
The eligibility period for the 36th GLAAD Media Awards ran from January 1, 2024, to December 31, 2024. All nominees and winners are listed below.

=== Film ===
| Outstanding Film – Wide Release: My Old Ass (Amazon MGM Studios); Cuckoo (Neon); Drive-Away Dolls (Focus Features); Love Lies Bleeding (A24); Mean Girls (Paramount Pictures); Problemista (A24); Queer (A24); Wicked (Universal Pictures) | Outstanding Film – Limited Release: Crossing (MUBI); 20,000 Species of Bees (Film Movement); Backspot (XYZ Films); Before I Change My Mind (Epic Pictures); Big Boys (Dark Star Pictures); Close to You (Greenwich Entertainment); Fitting In (Blue Fox Entertainment); High Tide (Strand Releasing); Housekeeping for Beginners (Focus Features); A Place of Our Own (Dark Star Pictures) | Outstanding Film – Streaming or TV: The Groomsmen: Second Chances (Hallmark); Am I Ok? (Max); Fancy Dance (Apple TV+); Good Grief (Netflix); The Holiday Exchange (Amazon Prime Video / Peacock); Mother of the Bride (Netflix); Ricky Stanicky (Amazon Prime Video); Season's Greetings from Cherry Lane (Hallmark); Sweethearts (Max); Wynonna Earp: Vengeance (Tubi) |

=== Television ===
| Outstanding New Series: Agatha All Along (Disney+); Black Doves (Netflix); Brilliant Minds (NBC); Diarra from Detroit (BET+); Fantasmas (HBO); Hazbin Hotel (Amazon Prime Video); How to Die Alone (Hulu); Kaos (Netflix); No Good Deed (Netflix); Palm Royale (Apple TV+) | Outstanding Limited or Anthology Series: Baby Reindeer (Netflix); Becoming Karl Lagerfeld (Disney+); Carol & The End of the World (Netflix); Eric (Netflix); Expats (Amazon Prime Video); Feud: Capote vs The Swans (FX); Get Millie Black (Max); Mary & George (Starz); The New Look (Apple TV+); Under the Bridge (Hulu) |
| Outstanding Comedy Series: Hacks (Max); Abbott Elementary (ABC); Ghosts (CBS); Loot (Apple TV+); The Sex Lives of College Girls (Max); Shrinking (Apple TV+); Somebody Somewhere (HBO); Sort Of (Max); We Are Lady Parts (Peacock); What We Do in the Shadows (FX) | Outstanding Drama Series: 9-1-1: Lone Star (Fox); Arcane (Netflix); The Chi (Showtime); Doctor Who (BBC/Disney+); Found (NBC); Heartbreak High (Netflix); Interview with the Vampire (AMC); Star Trek: Discovery (Paramount+); The Umbrella Academy (Netflix); Wicked City (ALLBLK) |
| Outstanding Reality Program: The Real Housewives of New York City (Bravo); Bargain Block (HGTV); Big Freedia Means Business (Fuse); The Boyfriend (Netflix); Queer Eye (Netflix); Selling Sunset (Netflix); Southern Charm (Bravo); Wayne Brady: The Family Remix (Freeform); We're Here (HBO); Wiggin' Out with Tokyo Stylez (We TV) | Outstanding Reality Competition Program: RuPaul's Drag Race (MTV); The Amazing Race (CBS); The Boulet Brothers' Dragula (Shudder / AMC+); The Challenge 40: Battle of the Eras (MTV); Finding Mr. Christmas (Hallmark+); Hell's Kitchen: Head Chef's Only (Fox); I Kissed a Boy (Hulu); I Kissed a Girl (Hulu); Top Chef (Bravo); The Voice (NBC) |
| Outstanding Documentary: Will & Harper (Netflix); "Breaking the News" Independent Lens (PBS); "Campbell Addy" Photographer (National Geographic); Chasing Chasing Amy (Level 33 Entertainment); Down in the Valley (Starz); Hidden Master: The Legacy of George Platt Lynes (Greenwich Entertainment); "Hummingbirds" POV (PBS); Lil Nas X: Long Live Montero (HBO); Outstanding: A Comedy Revolution (Netflix); "Who I am Not" POV (PBS) | Outstanding Variety or Talk Show Episode: "Elliot Page Talks Season 4 of The Umbrella Academy, Fighting Anti-LGBTQ Legislation" The View (ABC); The 77th Tony Awards (CBS); The 98th Macy's Thanksgiving Day Parade (NBC); "Bernie Sanders Rips the Democratic Establishment; Trump Allies Claim Massive Mandate: A Closer Look" Late Night with Seth Meyers (NBC); "D.C. Woman Turns Childhood Home Into Communal Living For LGBTQ+ Seniors" The Kelly Clarkson Show (syndicated); "DNA: This is Not My Child / Mom, Why Can't You Accept Me?" Karamo (syndicated); "Laverne Cox Unpacks Anti-LGBTQ+ Legislation, Bullying & Transness for Spirit Day" The Daily Show (Comedy Central); "Libraries" Last Week Tonight with John Oliver (HBO); "Queer Teacher Gets a Life-Changing Surprise!" The Jennifer Hudson Show (syndicated); "A Special Monologue for the Republican in Your Life" Jimmy Kimmel Live (ABC) |

=== Children's and Youth Programming ===
| Outstanding Children's Programming: The Fairly OddParents: A New Wish (Nickelodeon); "Aunt Praline's Sweetie Pie" Strawberry Shortcake: Berry in the Big City (Paramount+); Firebuds (Disney Jr.); "I'm Pogey" Fraggle Rock: Back to the Rock (Apple TV+); Let's Go, Bananas! (Cartoonito); Monster High (Nickelodeon); "Our Family Musical" Sesame Street (Max); "Princess Royal Wedding" Princess Power (Netflix); Star Wars: Young Jedi Adventures (Disney Jr. / Disney+); Vida the Vet (Netflix) | Outstanding Kids and Family Programming - Live Action: Heartstopper (Netflix); Empire Waist (Blue Fox Entertainment); "If You Love Me" Beyond Black Beauty (Amazon Prime Video); Jane (Apple TV+); "Louds in Love" The Really Loud House (Nickelodeon) | Outstanding Kids and Family Programming - Animated: Jurassic World: Chaos Theory (Netflix); The Bravest Knight (Hulu); The Dragon Prince (Netflix); Fright Krewe (Hulu / Peacock); Kiff: The Haunting of Miss McGravy's House (Disney Channel); "I Wanna Dance with My Buddy" Hailey's On It! (Disney Channel); The Loud House (Nickelodeon); Moon Girl and Devil Dinosaur (Disney Channel); "Powerless" Monsters at Work (Disney Channel); "Summer of Heart Eyes" Primos (Disney Channel) |

=== Other ===
| Outstanding Broadway Production: Lempicka, book by Carson Kreitzer, Matt Gould, music by Matt Gould, lyrics by Carson Kreitzer (tie); Oh, Mary!, by Cole Escola (tie); Cult of Love, by Leslye Headland; Illinoise, book by Justin Peck, Jackie Sibblies Drury, music and lyrics by Sufjan Stevens; Mother Play, by Paula Vogel | Outstanding Video Game: Dragon Age: The Veilguard (BioWare / Electronic Arts); Caravan SandWitch (Studio Plane Toast / Dear Villagers); Dread Delusion (Lovely Hellplace / DreadXP); Dustborn (Red Thread Games / Spotlight by Quantic Dream); Fear the Spotlight (Cozy Game Pals / Blumhouse Games); Life is Strange: Double Exposure (Deck Nine / Square Enix); Minds Beneath Us (BearBone Studio); Paper Mario: The Thousand-Year Door (Intelligent Systems / Nintendo); Sorry We're Closed (à la mode games / Akupara Games); Until Then (Polychroma Games / Maximum Entertainment) |
| Outstanding Comic Book: Suicide Squad: Dream Team, by Nicole Maines, Eddy Barrows, Eber Ferreira, José Luís, Adriano Di Benedetto, Adriano Lucas, Becca Carey (DC Comics); Alan Scott: The Green Lantern, by Tim Sheridan, Cian Tormey, Jordi Tarragona, Raúl Fernandez, John Livesay, Matt Herms, Chris Sotomayor, Lucas Gattoni (DC Comics); Avengers Academy: Marvel's Voices, by Anthony Oliveira, Carola Borelli, Bailie Rosenlund, IG Guara, Alba Glez, Elisabetta D'Amico, Pablo Collar, Karen S. Darboe, Carlos Lopez, KJ Díaz, Ian Herring, Frank William, Ariana Maher, Joe Caramagna (Marvel Infinity Comics); Captain Marvel, by Alyssa Wong, Jan Bazaldua, Ruairí Coleman, Roberto Poggi, Bryan Valenza, Carlos Lopez, Ariana Maher (Marvel Comics); I Heart Skull-Crusher, by Josie Campbell, Alessio Zonno, Angel De Santiago, Jim Campbell (BOOM! Studios); The Nice House by the Sea, by James Tynion IV, Álvaro Martínez Bueno, Jordie Bellaire, Andworld Design (DC Comics); NYX, by Jackson Lanzing, Collin Kelly, Francesco Mortarino, Enid Balám, Elisabetta D'Amico, Michael Shelfer, Raúl Angulo, Joe Sabino (Marvel Comics); The Oddly Pedestrian Life of Christopher Chaos, by Tate Brombal based on an idea by James Tynion IV, Isaac Goodhart, Soo Lee, Naomi Franq, Miquel Muerto, Patricio Delpeche, Héctor Barros, Aditya Bidikar (Dark Horse Comics); Poison Ivy, by G. Willow Wilson, Marcio Takara, Luana Vecchio, Haining, Arif Prianto, Hassan Otsmane-Elhaou (DC Comics); Spectregraph, by James Tynion IV, Christian Ward, Aditya Bidikar (DSTLRY) | Outstanding Graphic Novel/Anthology: Becoming Who We Are: Real Stories About Growing Up Trans, [anthology] (A Wave Blue World); Ash's Cabin, by Jen Wang (First Second); Bad Dream: A Dreamer Story, by Nicole Maines, Rye Hickman (DC Comics); Deadendia: The Divine Order, by Hamish Steele (Union Square & Co.); The Deep Dark, by Lee Knox Ostertag (Graphix); The Fox Maidens, by Robin Ha (HarperAlley); Lunar Boy, by Jes Wibowo and Cin Wibowo (HarperAlley); My Fairy Godfather, by Robert Mailer Anderson, Jon Sack (Fantagraphics); The Ribbon Skirt, by Cameron Mukwa (Graphix); The Science of Ghosts, by Lilah Sturges, El Garing, Alitha Martinez, Hassan Otsmane-Elhaou, Jimmy Betancourt (Legendary Comics) |
| Outstanding Music Artist: Doechii, Alligator Bites Never Heal (Top Dawg Entertainment/Capitol Records); Adam Lambert, AFTERS (More is More); Billie Eilish, HIT ME HARD AND SOFT (Darkroom/Interscope); Elton John, Never Too Late: Soundtrack to the Disney+ Documentary (UMG Recordings); Joy Oladokun, OBSERVATIONS FROM A CROWDED ROOM (Verve Forecast/Republic Records); Kali Uchis, ORQUÍDEAS (Geffen Records); Omar Apollo, God Said No (Warner Records); Orville Peck, Stampede (Warner Records); Tove Lo, HEAT (Pretty Swede Records); Victoria Monét, JAGUAR II: Deluxe (Lovett Music/RCA Records) | Outstanding Breakthrough Music Artist: Durand Bernarr (DSing Records); Beabadoobee (Dirty Hit); The Blessed Madonna (Major Recordings / Warner Record); Gigi Perez (Gigi Perez PS/Island); The Last Dinner Party (Island Records); Medium Build (Island Records); Michaela Jaé (TribeDisciples); Remi Wolf (Island Records); Villano Antillano (La Buena Fortuna Music); Young Miko (Wave Music Group/Capitol Records) |
Outstanding Podcast: Baby, This is Keke Palmer (Wondery); But We Loved (iHeart); Las Culturistas (iHeart); Made it Out (Made It Out Media); Queer West (Audible); Rooted Recovery Stories (Promises Behavioral Health/The Cast Collective); "The Science Of Transgender Healthcare, Puberty Blockers, & Conversion Therapy with Dr. Jack Turban" The Checkup with Dr. Mike (DM Operations Inc.); Sibling Rivalry (Studio 71); Surface Level; Tres Leches

=== Journalism ===
| Outstanding TV Journalism Segment: "Big Gay Football" CBS Sports (CBS); "Becoming Che" SC Featured (ESPN); "Demystifying Trans Identities" (Spectrum News 1 Ohio); "Pete and Chasten Buttigieg on Fatherhood" CBS News Sunday Morning (CBS); "Project Asylum: Transgender Asylum Seekers Find Hope Through San Francisco's LGBTQ Asylum Project" CBS News Bay Area (KPIX-TV CBS 5 Bay Area); "Small Town in Arkansas a Safe Haven For LGBTQ+ Residents" GMA3 (ABC); "Spectrum Indigenous Celebrates Pride Month With Two Spirit Powwows" KREM 2 News (KREM-TV CBS 2 Spokane); "Stonewall House" NBC News Now (NBC); "Transgender Pastor In California Builds Inclusive Church For LGBTQ+ Community" CBS Mornings (CBS); "Vogue Realness: Billy Porter & LGBTQIA Community Celebrate Dancer O'Shae Sibley" America In Black (BET+) | Outstanding TV Journalism – Long-Form: "The Life and Death of Blaze Bernstein" 48 Hours (CBS); "American Problems, Trans Solutions" Local, USA (PBS via WORLD Channel); "The Cure for HIV" Scripps News Reports (Scripps News); "Chella Man" It's Ok to Ask Questions (WMAQ-TV NBC 5 Chicago); "Proud Legacy: A NY1 Special" (Spectrum News NY1) |
Outstanding Live TV Journalism – Segment or Special: "Sarah McBride reflects on Becoming First Openly Transgender Person Elected To Congress" PBS NewsHour (PBS); "Africa's Anti-LGBTQ Laws: Impact on Uganda's Economy, Ghana Wants Bill Accelerated" Horizons Middle East & Africa (Bloomberg Television); "Algerian Boxer Imane Khelif Names J.K. Rowling and Elon Musk in Cyberbullying Suit" NBC News Now (NBC); "Democrats are Learning The Wrong Message on Trans Youth" Inside with Jen Psaki (MSNBC); "Finding Love & Light in Unexpected Places: Small Towns Celebrate Pride Across America" Good Morning America (ABC); "Ina Fried Talks Imane Khelif" The Saturday/Sunday Show with Jonathan Capehart (MSNBC); "LGBTQ+ Asylum Seekers flee to U.S. to Save Their Lives" José Díaz-Balart Reports (MSNBC); "Pride Across America" ABC News Group (ABC); "Rep. Leigh Finke Discusses Gender Affirming Healthcare with Pamela Brown" CNN Newsroom (CNN); "Young Voters Could Decide The 2024 Election" The 11th Hour with Stephanie Ruhle (MSNBC)
| Outstanding Print Article: "'Changing The Narrative': Advocates Fight HIV Stigma in Dallas' Latino Community" by Abraham Nudelstejer (The Dallas Morning News); "After Trump's Election Win, Local Trans Community Concerned About Their Future" by DeAsia Paige (The Atlanta Journal Constitution); "'I Want To Exist': Three Days at a Texas Summer Camp for LGBTQ Kids." by Erin Allday (San Antonio Express-News / San Francisco Chronicle); "Joe Locke on 'Heartstopper' Embracing Sex, Being a Queer Marvel Star in 'Agatha' and Why 'There Are Days I Never Want to Play a Gay Character Again'" by Adam B. Vary (Variety); "Meet the Young Transgender Teens Changing America and the World" by Ryan Adamczeski (The Advocate); "Noah J. Ricketts Brings the Bluegrass to Hollywood and Broadway" by Spencer Jenkins (Queer Kentucky); "Opinion: Celebrating 10 Years of Marriage Equality, More LGBTQ+ History Left to Write" by Josiah Robinson (Tulsa World); "Our Queerest Century" [special project] (Los Angeles Times); "Paris Olympics: More Queer Athletes, More Medals, More Pride, Less Grindr" by Dawn Ennis (Washington Blade); "Sasha Velour Sashays Into The Culture Wars" by Maura Judkis (The Washington Post) | Outstanding Magazine Overall Coverage: The Advocate; Allure; Cosmopolitan; The Hollywood Reporter; Metro Weekly; OUT; People; Plus; Variety; Vogue |
| Outstanding Online Journalism Article: "Friends Remember Nex Benedict, Oklahoma Student Who Died After School Fight, as 'Fiery Kid'" by Jo Yurcaba (NBCNews.com); "Afraid Your Child Will Regret Their Transition? Let's Talk About It!" by Ben V. Greene (Romper.com); "CeCé Telfer Was Barred From Competing at The 2024 Paris Olympics as a Trans Woman Athlete. She Has Her Sights Set On L.A. In 2028." by David Artavia (Yahoo.com); "First They Tried to 'Cure' Gayness. Now They're Fixated on 'Healing' Trans People." by Madison Pauly with Henry Carnell (MotherJones.com); "Fleeing the Country and Rationing Testosterone: Transgender Americans' New Reality Under a Trump Presidency" by Beth Greenfield (Fortune.com); "He's 23 and in an Ohio Prison for Exposing Someone to HIV – Even Though He Couldn't Transmit the Virus" with Ken Schneck/Rachel Dissell (TheBuckeyeFlame.com/TheMarshallProject.com); "Missouri Republican's Antigay Slur-Filled Posts Remain on Instagram Despite Violating Meta's Policies" by Christopher Wiggins (Advocate.com); "Thailand Could Soon Legalize Same-Sex Marriage. It Would Change Lives." by Rebecca Root (them.us); "These Trans People And Their Families Can't Afford To Flee To A Friendlier State" by Nico Lang (HuffPost.com); "Your Guide to Accessing Gender-Affirming Care" by Madison Feller (Elle.com) | Outstanding Online Journalism – Video or Multimedia: "Rainbow Girls: 10 Years of Protection and Prejudice" The Picture Show (NPR.org); "Ballin' Out" (OutSports.com); "The Legacy of Cecilia Gentili: First Pride Without Mother" (Time.com); "A Life In Fear: The Dangers Of Finding Love Online As A Queer Woman In Nigeria" (CNN.com); "Love to the Max: Family Bonds Protect a Trans Teen in Texas" (NewYorker.com); "The Past, Present, and Future of Trans Visibility in Fashion" (InStyle.com); "RuPaul, Tina Knowles, Billy Eichner & More Give Ts Madison Her Flowers" (LogoTV.com); "The Uncertain Future Of A Historic LGBTQ+ Safe Space: New York City's People's Beach" (ABCNews.com); "War On Woke: How a Gay Rights Index Once Touted By Walmart And Others Became a Conservative Target" (CNBC.com); "Seat 31: Zooey Zephyr" (NewYorker.com) |
Outstanding Independent Journalism: The 19th; Assigned Media; The Buckeye Flame; The Don Lemon Show; Erin in the Morning; Gaye Magazine; Queer News Daily; The Queer Review; TransLash Media; Under the Desk News

=== Spanish-Language ===
Outstanding Online Journalism Article
- "Jóvenes latinos gay ven un porcentaje creciente de nuevos casos de VIH en EEUU" by Devna Bose, Laura Bargfeld, Phillip Reese, and Vanessa G. Sánchez (APNews.com, KFFHealthNews.org & Univision.com)
  - "Así se desmontan los argumentos de una persona TERF" by Aitana Villegas (Huffingtonpost.es)
  - "Cuando cambiar de nombre es todo un reto: la lucha de las infancias trans en México" by Alicia Fábregas (ElPais.com)
  - "Estudio lo confirma: jóvenes LGBTQ+ en Puerto Rico son más propensos al acoso, la depresión, ideación e intentos suicidas" by David Cordero Mercado (ElNuevoDia.com)
  - "Frida Cartas: "Yo no salí del clóset, salí del útero de mi madre y años más tarde tuve que autoparirme sola" by Diana Massis (BBC Mundo)
  - "Los líderes emberá LGBTI que resisten a las terapias de conversión y a las amenazas de los paramilitares" by Daniela Díaz (ElPais.com)
  - "Mujeres trans en deportes: cuando lo más importante es poder competir" by Oscar Bermeo Ocaña* (Sentiido.com)
  - "Señales de retroceso para la comunidad LGBTQ de Argentina bajo el nuevo gobierno de Javier Milei" by Debora Rey (The Associated Press y El Nuevo Día)
  - "Sindicalista y mujer trans: esta es la historia de Maura Alzate" by Mariana Escobar Bernoske (ElEspectador.com)
  - "'Trump quiere borrarnos': la lucha por los derechos de la comunidad LGBTQ resuena en la convención demócrata" by Albinson Linares (Telemundo.com)

=== Special recognition ===
| Special Recognition: DRAG: The Musical; OUTLOUD; "Red Ink: A Tribute to Cecilia Gentili"; The Stonewall National Monument Visitor Center; "The Q Agenda" (LatiNation); the New York Liberty | Special Recognition (Spanish-Language): La Verdrag" (Canal Once); "The Q Agenda" (LatiNation) |

== See also ==
- List of LGBT-related awards
- 2nd Rainbow Awards
