= Las Culturistas =

Comedy and pop-culture podcast

- Genre: Pop culture; Comedy
- Country of origin: United States
- Language: English

Cast and voices
- Hosted by: Bowen Yang; Matt Rogers

Publication
- Original release: March 9, 2016 – present
- Updates: Weekly

Related
- Website: Official website

Las Culturistas is a pop-culture and comedy podcast co-hosted by Bowen Yang and Matt Rogers, produced by Will Ferrell's Big Money Players podcast network and iHeartRadio. Started in March 2016, it was previously part of the Forever Dog podcast network.

== Format ==
Each week, hosts Rogers and Yang discuss popular culture, current events, and their personal lives.

Many episodes feature guests, whom the hosts invite to discuss their formative cultural experiences with the question, "What was the culture that made you say 'Culture is for me'?"

Throughout the episodes, the hosts will declare certain statements to be "Rules of Culture" by reciting them together in unison and assigning them numbers, such as, "Rule of Culture #1: If you don't love Gaga, you don't love yourself."

Toward the end of every episode, there is a segment called "I Don't Think So, Honey", during which the hosts and any guests are each given sixty seconds to rant about an element of culture they find frustrating. Every episode then ends with the hosts briefly singing a song, usually one that has been discussed at some point during the episode.

The hosts refer to their listeners as Readers and have expanded to refer to them also as Kayteighs, Publicists, Finalists, and Kyles.

Las Culturistas host occasional I Don't Think So, Honey Live shows featuring up to fifty local comedians performing their own versions of the segment.

== Las Culturistas Culture Awards ==
Every June since 2022, Yang and Rogers host an annual live parody award show called the Las Culturistas Culture Awards, which has featured live musical performances by Yang, Rogers, and others; guest appearances by fellow actors, comedians, podcasters, and musicians; and video acceptance speeches from minor and major celebrities including Taylor Swift, Andy Cohen, Ariana Grande, Alan Cumming, Vanderpump Rules' Ariana Madix, Bonnie Milligan, Cate Blanchett, and more. The 2025 Culture Awards were filmed in July, and were broadcast on Bravo with next day availability on Peacock on August 5, 2025.

== Reception ==
The podcast has received critical acclaim. Vulture has praised it for being original and avoiding guests that might rehash stories told elsewhere. Time rated it one of the 50 best podcasts in its 2018 list. It received a Best Podcast nomination for the 11th Shorty Awards in 2019. In 2023 and 2025, it won the Podcast of the Year award at the iHeartRadio Podcast Awards. The podcast has been cited in academic work for the hosts' insight into the entertainment industry. In 2024, it won the Outstanding Podcast award at the GLAAD Media Awards.

== Hiatus ==
On their December 18, 2019, show, "Nasal & Ridiculous," Las Culturistas announced they would be taking a hiatus and that the show would not continue on with the Forever Dog network. In March 2020, Las Culturistas returned with new episodes on Will Ferrell's Big Money Players podcast network with iHeart Radio.

== Awards and nominations ==
Year	Association	Category	Result	Ref.
2019	Shorty Awards	Best Podcast	Nominated	
2021	iHeartRadio Podcast Awards	Best Pop Culture Podcast	Nominated	
2022	iHeartRadio Podcast Awards	Best Comedy Podcast	Nominated	
2023	iHeartRadio Podcast Awards	Best Comedy Podcast	Nominated	
2023	iHeartRadio Podcast Awards	Podcast of the Year	Won	
2024	GLAAD Media Awards	Outstanding Podcast	Won	
