= GLAAD Golden Gate Award =

The GLAAD Golden Gate Award is a special GLAAD Media Award presented annually by the Gay & Lesbian Alliance Against Defamation at the GLAAD Media Awards ceremony held in San Francisco. It is presented to individuals in media and entertainment who have increased the visibility and understanding of the LGBT community.

== List of recipients ==
- 2000 – Margaret Cho
- 2002 – Brooke Shields
- 2003 – Stockard Channing
- 2004 – Megan Mullally
- 2005 – Jennifer Beals
- 2006 – Jennifer Tilly
- 2008 – James Schamus
- 2010 – Cybill Shepherd
- 2011 – Kim Cattrall
- 2012 – Shonda Rhimes
- 2013 – Gavin Newsom
