= GLAAD Media Award =

Award for LGBT representation in media

- Current: 37th GLAAD Media Awards
- Awarded for: Outstanding media portrayals of LGBTQ people
- Country: United States
- Presented by: GLAAD
- First award: 1990
- Website: glaad.org/mediaawards

The GLAAD Media Award is a US accolade bestowed by GLAAD to recognize and honor various branches of the media for outstanding portrayals of LGBTQ people and the issues that affect their lives. In addition to film and television, the Awards also recognize achievements in other branches of the media and arts, including theatre, music, journalism and advertising.

Honorees are selected by a process involving over 700 GLAAD Media Award voters and volunteers and are evaluated using four criteria: "Fair, Accurate and Inclusive Representations" of the LGBT community, "Boldness and Originality" of the project, significant "Cultural Impact" on mainstream culture, and "Overall Quality" of the project. Results are then certified by a "Review Panel" who determine the final list of recipients based on voting results and their own "expert opinions".

The 1st GLAAD Media Awards ceremony honoring the 1989 season was held in 1990, and recognized 34 nominees in 7 competitive categories.

== History ==
The first GLAAD Media Awards were presented by the Gay & Lesbian Alliance Against Defamation in 1990 to honor the 1989 season, and were envisioned as a way to recognize various branches of the media for their fair, accurate and inclusive representations of the lesbian, gay, bisexual and transgender community and the issues that affect their lives.

The 1st Annual Awards ceremony recognized 34 nominees in 7 competitive categories and was a relatively "small" affair. At the 20th Annual Awards ceremony presented in 2009, GLAAD Award Honoree, Phil Donahue said of the first Annual ceremony: "It's unbelievable to think about the power and the warp speed of this revolution. Twenty years ago when I proudly accepted the first GLAAD Media Award…it was a very small crowd. There are more photographers here tonight than there were people then".

For the first six years, winners were announced prior to the ceremony. Beginning with the 7th Annual Awards held in 1996, the change was made to its current format, announcing the winners in competitive categories at the ceremony. The 15th Annual Awards held in 2004 marked the first year nominations were expanded to recognize media in Spanish-language categories. The 16th Annual Awards held in 2005 marked the first year that the ceremonies were televised, first airing on the LGBT-themed Logo channel on July 24, 2005.

== Statuette ==
The original GLAAD Media Award stood approximately 6-inches (15 cm) tall, consisting of a flat, 5-inch (13 cm) square-shaped crystal sculpture with a design of five concentric circles on a "newsprint" background. The sculpture was traditionally etched with the year it was presented followed by the words "GLAAD Media Award" and was mounted perpendicular to its flat, quadrant shaped base.

The award remained unchanged until 2009, when an all new statuette designed by David Moritz of Society Awards was unveiled for the 20th annual GLAAD Media Awards ceremonies. The current statuette stands 12-inches (30.5 cm) tall, consisting of a 9-inch (23 cm) die-cast zinc sculpture, hand finished with a satin texture, plated with a nickel and rhodium finish, and mounted on a 3-inch (7.6 cm) tall, black-stained ash, trapezoidal shaped base.

== Nomination and selection ==
Nominees are selected by GLAAD "Nominating Juries" consisting of over 90 volunteers with interest and expertise in the particular category they are judging. Nominating Juries may select up to ten nominees in each category since 2015; previous presentations only allowed up to five. If no projects are deemed worthy of nomination in a particular category, the jury may choose to not award that category. At the end of the year, the Nominating Juries submit their list of recommended nominees to GLAAD's staff and Board of Directors for approval.

In addition to media monitoring by the juries, GLAAD issues a "Call for Entries", inviting media outlets to submit their work for consideration, however, GLAAD may nominate a mainstream media project even if it is not submitted as part of the call for entries. GLAAD does not monitor media created by and for the LGBT community for defamation, therefore, media outlets created by and for an LGBT audience must submit in order to be considered for nomination.

Candidates considered for nomination are evaluated using four criteria: "Fair, Accurate and Inclusive Representations", meaning that the diversity of the LGBT community is represented, "Boldness and Originality", meaning the project breaks new ground by exploring LGBT subject matter in non-traditional ways, "Cultural Impact", meaning the project impacts an audience that may not regularly be exposed to LGBT issues, and "Overall Quality", meaning a project of extremely high quality which adds impact and significance to the images and issues portrayed.

Over 600 GLAAD Media Award voters participate in the selection of Honorees from the pool of Nominees in each category via online balloting. Voters are made up of three groups: GLAAD staff and board, GLAAD Alliance and Media Circle members, and GLAAD volunteers & allies (which include former Honorees, media industry allies, volunteers from the "Nominating Juries" and "Event Production Teams").

These results are then reviewed for certification by a "Review Panel" which consists of the GLAAD Board co-chairs, senior GLAAD program and communications staff, and media industry experts. Members of the Review Panel are expected to view all of the nominees in each category, and the final list of award recipients is determined by the Review Panel based on the results of the online balloting and their own "expert opinions".

== Categories ==
The first Annual Awards recognized Honorees in just 7 competitive categories, all for television. Over the years, the competitive categories have been expanded to recognize various other branches of the media including, film, theatre, music, print media, digital media, and advertising, as well as establishing additional categories recognizing Spanish-language media and a "Special Recognition" category for media representations that may not meet the criteria of pre-existing categories. Unlike similar awards, the GLAAD Media Awards do not honor individual cast or crew in competitive categories for film or television performances.

While many of the categories have been expanded over time, several early categories have been "merged" or phased out altogether. One notable example being the omission of the "Outstanding Daytime Drama" category in 2011, reflecting the steady decline in popularity of English-language daytime soaps. As of 2018, GLAAD considers nominations in a total of 27 English-language categories and 12 Spanish-language categories, however, If no projects within a category are deemed worthy of recognition, GLAAD may choose to not award the category that year. As of 2023, there are 33 competitive categories:

=== English-language ===
Film
- Outstanding Film – Wide Release (1991-present)
- Outstanding Film – Limited Release (1994-present)
- Outstanding Film – Streaming or TV

Television

- Outstanding Documentary (1990-present)
- Outstanding Comedy Series (1990-present)
- Outstanding Drama Series (1990-present)
- Outstanding Limited or Anthology Series (1994-present)
- Outstanding New TV Series (2023-present)
- Outstanding Reality Program (2004-present)
- Outstanding Reality Competition Program (2023-present)
- Outstanding Children's Programming (2021-present)
- Outstanding Kids and Family Programming - Live Action (2018-present)
- Outstanding Kids and Family Programming - Animated (2023-present)
- Outstanding Variety or Talk Show Episode (2005-present)

Other

- Outstanding Blog (2011-present)
- Outstanding Broadway Production (1991, 1993-present)
- Outstanding Comic Book (1992-present)
- Outstanding Graphic Novel/Anthology (2022-present)
- Outstanding Music Artist (1991-present)
- Outstanding Breakthrough Music Artist (2021-present)
- Outstanding Podcast (2023-present)
- Outstanding Video Game (2019-present)
- Special Recognition

Journalism

- Outstanding TV Journalism – Newsmagazine (2006-present)
- Outstanding TV Journalism Segment (1992-1993, 2006-present)
- Outstanding Newspaper – Overall Coverage
- Outstanding Newspaper Article
- Outstanding Newspaper Columnist
- Outstanding Magazine – Overall Coverage
- Outstanding Magazine Article
- Outstanding Digital Journalism Article
- Outstanding Digital Journalism – Multimedia

=== Spanish-language ===
- Outstanding TV Novela
- Outstanding Daytime Talk Show Episode
- Outstanding Talk Show Interview
- Outstanding TV Journalism – Newsmagazine
- Outstanding TV Journalism Segment
- Outstanding Newspaper Article
- Outstanding Magazine Article
- Outstanding Digital Journalism Article
- Outstanding Digital Journalism – Multimedia
- Outstanding Blog
- Outstanding Music Artist
- Special Recognition

=== Defunct categories ===
- Outstanding Individual Episode (1998-2020)
- Outstanding Daily Drama
- Outstanding New York Theater – Broadway & Off-Broadway
- Outstanding New York Theater – Off-Off Broadway
- Outstanding Los Angeles Theater

== Special awards ==
In addition to the GLAAD Media Awards' competitive categories, special non-competitive "Honorary Awards" have also been presented since the first Awards ceremony. Beginning with just one Honorary Award, then known as the "Special Honoree Award" presented at the first annual GLAAD Media Awards, the Honorary Awards have also been expanded to recognize the diversity of contributions of respective Honorees. The most notable of these Special Honorary Awards are:

Ally Award
Presented twice at the GLAAD Media Awards in New York to Brett Ratner & Mariah Carey. It is presented to a media figure who has consistently used their platform to support and advance LGBT equality and acceptance.
Advocate for Change Award
Presented at the Los Angeles GLAAD Media Awards in 2013. Its inaugural recipient was former U.S. President Bill Clinton for his record of promoting tolerance, including advocating same-sex marriage and calling for the Supreme Court of the United States to strike down the Defense of Marriage Act. The award was presented to Madonna in 2019.
Davidson/Valentini Award
Presented annually at the San Francisco GLAAD Media Awards. It is named in memory of Craig Davidson, GLAAD's first executive director, and his partner Michael Valentini, a GLAAD supporter. It is presented to an openly LGBT individual who has made a significant difference in promoting equal rights for the LGBT community.
Excellence in Media Award
Presented annually at the New York GLAAD Media Awards. It is presented to individuals in the media and entertainment industries who through their work have increased the visibility and understanding of the LGBT community.
Golden Gate Award
Presented annually at the San Francisco GLAAD Media Awards. It is presented to media professionals who have increased the visibility and understanding of the LGBT community.
Pioneer Award
Presented at the GLAAD Media Awards. It is presented to a pioneering individual, group or outlet that has made a significant contribution to the development of LGBT-inclusive media images prior to the existence of the GLAAD Media Awards.
Stephen F. Kolzak Award
Presented annually at the GLAAD Media Awards. It is named after Stephen Kolzak, the Los Angeles casting director who devoted the last part of his life to fighting AIDS-phobia and homophobia in the entertainment industry. The award is given to an openly LGBT member of the entertainment or media community for his or her work toward eliminating homophobia.
Vanguard Award
Presented annually at the Los Angeles GLAAD Media Awards. It is presented to a member of the entertainment community who has made a significant difference in promoting equal rights for LGBT people.
Visibilidad Award
Presented at the GLAAD Media Awards. It is presented to an openly LGBT Spanish-language media professional who has made a significant difference in promoting equal rights for the LGBT community.
Vito Russo Award
Presented annually at the GLAAD Media Awards. It is named in memory of Vito Russo, a founding member of GLAAD, and presented to an openly LGBT media professional who has made a significant difference in promoting equality for the LGBT community.

== Ceremony ==
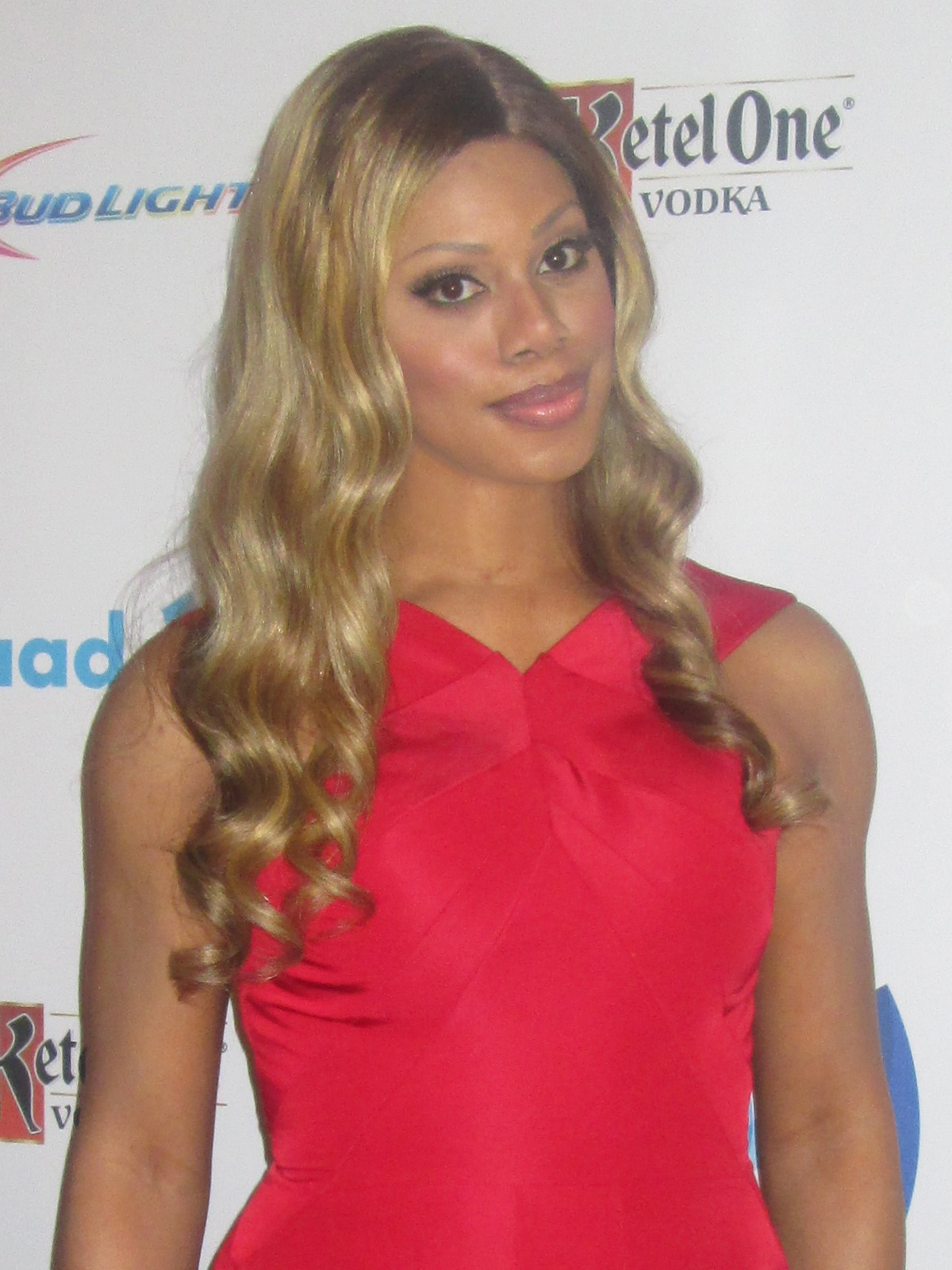
GLAAD Media Award Honoree Laverne Cox at the 25th GLAAD Media Awards, Los Angeles, April 12, 2014.

Award recipients are announced at the annual GLAAD Media Awards banquet ceremonies usually held in New York, Los Angeles, and San Francisco to honor achievements from January 1 to December 31 of the previous calendar year. Over the years, ceremonies have also been held in Washington, D.C., and Miami. Each year's hosts and presenters are usually selected from former Honorees, celebrities and/or prominent public figures known for their contributions to the LGBT community.

The announcement of award recipients in all competitive categories is withheld until the ceremonies. Although presented annually in three cities, time constraints dictate that not all of the awards are presented onstage. Categories presented onstage in their respective cities are chosen to reflect the range of GLAAD's work with the media, representing a mix of entertainment, news, and Spanish-language awards. Recipients who are not announced onstage are instead announced by a listing in the ceremony's program book.

The 16th Annual Awards held in 2005 were the first year that the ceremonies were televised, first airing on the Logo channel on July 24, 2005. Logo continued to air the telecast annually, editing together each city's respective ceremonies for each year into one annual show, as well as airing a retrospective special in 2005 titled "The Best of the GLAAD Media Awards" which documented the history of the first 15 years of the Awards. Logo ceased to televise the ceremony in 2008 when the Bravo network acquired exclusive broadcast rights to air the 19th Annual Awards telecast.

GLAAD Media Awards ceremonies
Ceremony	Date	Venue	City	Host	Broadcaster
1st	April 29, 1990	Time & Life Building	New York City, New York	Phil Donahue	none
2nd	1991	Unknown	New York City, New York	Unknown	none
2nd	April 21, 1991	The Beverly Hilton	Beverly Hills, California (Note: Labeled as Los Angeles.)	Unknown	none
3rd	April 6, 1992	Windows on the World	New York City, New York	Unknown	none
3rd	April 11, 1992	The Beverly Hilton	Beverly Hills, California	Unknown	none
4th	March 20, 1993	The Beverly Hilton	Beverly Hills, California	Unknown	none
4th	March 28, 1993	Plaza Hotel	New York City, New York	Unknown	none
5th	March 13, 1994	Plaza Hotel	New York City, New York	Unknown	none
5th	March 19, 1994	Century Plaza Hotel	Los Angeles, California	Unknown	none
6th	March 12, 1995	Century Plaza Hotel	Los Angeles, California	Unknown	none
6th	March 16, 1995	Waldorf Astoria New York	New York City, New York	Unknown	none
6th	March 19, 1995	National Press Club	Washington, D.C.	Unknown	none
7th	March 7, 1996	Waldorf Astoria New York	New York City, New York	Unknown	none
7th	March 10, 1996	Century Plaza Hotel	Los Angeles, California	Unknown	none
7th	March 13, 1996	National Press Club	Washington, D.C.	Unknown	none
8th	March 16, 1997	Century Plaza Hotel	Los Angeles, California	Unknown	none
8th	March 26, 1997	National Press Club	Washington, D.C.	Unknown	none
8th	March 31, 1997	Sheraton New York Hotel and Towers	New York City, New York	Unknown	none
9th	March 30, 1998	Hilton New York	New York City, New York	Unknown	none
9th	April 4, 1998	George Washington Marriott	Washington, D.C.	Unknown	none
9th	April 19, 1998	Century Plaza Hotel	Los Angeles, California	Unknown	none
10th	March 28, 1999	Hilton New York	New York City, New York	Unknown	none
10th	April 17, 1999	Century Plaza Hotel	Los Angeles, California	Unknown	none
10th	May 8, 1999	JW Marriott Washington, DC	Washington, D.C.	Unknown	none
11th	April 2, 2000	Hilton New York	New York City, New York	Unknown	none
11th	April 15, 2000	Century Plaza Hotel	Los Angeles, California	Unknown	none
11th	May 13, 2000	JW Marriott Washington, DC	Washington, D.C.	Unknown	none
11th	June 3, 2000	Argent Hotel	San Francisco, California	Unknown	none
12th	April 16, 2001	Hilton New York	New York City, New York	Unknown	none
12th	April 28, 2001	The St. Regis Los Angeles	Los Angeles, California	Unknown	none
12th	May 12, 2001	Lisner Auditorium	Washington, D.C.	Unknown	none
12th	June 9, 2001	Westin St. Francis	San Francisco, California	Unknown	none
13th	April 1, 2002	New York Marriott Marquis	New York City, New York	Unknown	none
13th	April 13, 2002	Kodak Theatre	Los Angeles, California	Unknown	none
13th	June 1, 2002	Westin St. Francis	San Francisco, California	Unknown	none
14th	April 7, 2003	New York Marriott Marquis	New York City, New York	Unknown	none
14th	April 26, 2003	Kodak Theatre	Los Angeles, California	Unknown	none
14th	May 31, 2003	Westin St. Francis	San Francisco, California	Unknown	none
15th	March 27, 2004	New York Marriott Marquis	New York City, New York	Unknown	none
15th	April 12, 2004	Kodak Theatre	Los Angeles, California	Unknown	none
15th	June 5, 2004	Westin St. Francis	San Francisco, California	Unknown	none
16th	March 28, 2005	New York Marriott Marquis	New York City, New York	Unknown	Logo
16th	April 30, 2005	Kodak Theatre	Los Angeles, California	Unknown	Logo
16th	June 11, 2005	Westin St. Francis	San Francisco, California	Unknown	Logo
17th	March 27, 2006	New York Marriott Marquis	New York City, New York	Unknown	Logo
17th	April 8, 2006	Kodak Theatre	Los Angeles, California	Unknown	Logo
17th	May 25, 2006	Ritz-Carlton Hotel	Miami, Florida	Unknown	Logo
17th	June 10, 2006	JW Marriott San Francisco Union Square	San Francisco, California	Unknown	Logo
18th	March 26, 2007	New York Marriott Marquis	New York City, New York	Unknown	Logo
18th	April 14, 2007	Kodak Theatre	Los Angeles, California	Unknown	Logo
18th	April 28, 2007	Westin St. Francis	San Francisco, California	Unknown	Logo
18th	May 10, 2007	JW Marriott Marquis Miami	Miami, Florida	Unknown	Logo
19th	March 17, 2008	New York Marriott Marquis	New York City, New York	Unknown	Bravo
19th	April 12, 2008	Seminole Hard Rock Hotel and Casino Hollywood	Hollywood, Florida (Note: Labeled as Miami.)	Unknown	Bravo
19th	April 26, 2008	Kodak Theatre	Los Angeles, California	Unknown	Bravo
19th	May 10, 2008	JW Marriott San Francisco Union Square	San Francisco, California	Unknown	Bravo
20th	March 28, 2009	New York Marriott Marquis	New York City, New York	Unknown	Unknown
20th	April 18, 2009	Nokia Theatre	Los Angeles, California	Unknown	Unknown
20th	May 9, 2009	Hilton San Francisco Union Square	San Francisco, California	Unknown	Unknown
21st	March 13, 2010	New York Marriott Marquis	New York City, New York	Alan Cumming	Unknown
21st	April 18, 2010	Hyatt Regency Century Plaza	Los Angeles, California	Candis Cayne; Wilson Cruz	Unknown
21st	June 5, 2010	Westin St. Francis	San Francisco, California	Bruce Vilanch	Unknown
22nd	March 19, 2011	New York Marriott Marquis	New York City, New York	Andy Cohen	Unknown
22nd	April 10, 2011	Westin Bonaventure Hotel	Los Angeles, California	none	Unknown
22nd	May 14, 2011	San Francisco Marriott Marquis	San Francisco, California	Naya Rivera	Unknown
23rd	March 24, 2012	New York Marriott Marquis	New York City, New York	Naya Rivera; Cory Monteith	Unknown
23rd	April 21, 2012	Westin Bonaventure Hotel	Los Angeles, California	none	Unknown
23rd	June 2, 2012	San Francisco Marriott Marquis	San Francisco, California	Dianna Agron	Unknown
24th	March 16, 2013	New York Marriott Marquis	New York City, New York	none	Unknown
24th	April 20, 2013	JW Marriott Los Angeles L.A. LIVE	Los Angeles, California	none	Unknown
24th	May 11, 2013	Hilton San Francisco Union Square	San Francisco, California	none	Unknown
25th	April 12, 2014	The Beverly Hilton	Beverly Hills, California	none	Unknown
25th	May 3, 2014	Waldorf Astoria New York	New York City, New York	none	Unknown
26th	March 21, 2015	The Beverly Hilton	Beverly Hills, California	none	Unknown
26th	May 9, 2015	Waldorf Astoria New York	New York City, New York	none	Unknown
27th	April 4, 2016	The Beverly Hilton	Beverly Hills, California	Laverne Cox	Logo TV
27th	May 14, 2016	Waldorf Astoria New York	New York City, New York	none	Logo TV
28th	April 1, 2017	The Beverly Hilton	Beverly Hills, California	Cameron Esposito	Unknown
28th	May 6, 2017	New York Hilton Midtown	New York City, New York	Ross Mathews	Unknown
29th	April 12, 2018	The Beverly Hilton	Beverly Hills, California	Wanda Sykes	Unknown
29th	May 5, 2018	New York Hilton Midtown	New York City, New York	Ross Mathews	Unknown
30th	March 28, 2019	The Beverly Hilton	Beverly Hills, California	Ross Mathews	Unknown
30th	May 4, 2019	New York Hilton Midtown	New York City, New York	Shangela	Unknown
31st	July 30, 2020	none	online (Note: This event was held virtually.)	Fortune Feimster; Gina Yashere	Facebook; YouTube
32nd	April 8, 2021	none	online	Niecy Nash	Hulu
33rd	April 2, 2022	The Beverly Hilton	Beverly Hills, California	Bob the Drag Queen; Eureka O'Hara; Shangela	Hulu
33rd	May 6, 2022	New York Hilton Midtown	New York City, New York	Cody Rigsby; Peppermint	Hulu
34th	March 30, 2023	The Beverly Hilton	Beverly Hills, California	Margaret Cho	Hulu
34th	May 13, 2023	New York Hilton Midtown	New York City, New York	Harvey Guillén	Hulu
35th	March 14, 2024	The Beverly Hilton	Beverly Hills, California	Wayne Brady	Hulu
35th	May 12, 2024	New York Hilton Midtown	New York City, New York	Ross Mathews	Hulu
36th	March 27, 2025	The Beverly Hilton	Beverly Hills, California	Michael Urie	Hulu
37th	March 5, 2026	The Beverly Hilton	Beverly Hills, California	Jonathan Bennett	Hulu

== See also ==
- List of American television awards
- List of LGBT-related awards
- Felix-Rexhausen Award
- Rainbow Awards
