= Detroit Land Bank Authority =

Public authority in Detroit, Michigan, United States

- Abbreviation: DLBA
- Type: Public-benefit corporation
- Professional title: Equal housing opportunity provider
- Location: Detroit, US
- Website: www.buildingdetroit.org

The Detroit Land Bank Authority is a public authority that owns and manages approximately 100,000 parcels of property in the city of Detroit, making it the city's largest landowner.

Occasionally framed as a quasi-governmental entity, the Detroit Land Bank operates a number of programs to reduce the number of Detroit properties that are currently in public ownership. Funding sources include federal grants (Hardest Hit Funds) as well as financial support from the operating budget of the City of Detroit and private philanthropic donations. The Detroit Land Bank was originally created in 2008 at a much smaller scale, but began expanding into its current iteration in 2014, when properties owned by various public entities were consolidated into one agency. The property inventory of the Detroit Land Bank consists of vacant lots, abandoned houses, and many other structures that were often forced into tax foreclosure. The Detroit Land Bank sells houses on its website through multiple programs, including Auction, Own It Now, and Rehabbed & Ready. If Detroit residents live next door to a publicly owned vacant lot, they can purchase it for $100 through the Land Bank's "Side Lot Program". Other major initiatives of the organization include demolition, community partnership, nuisance abatement, and economic development.
