= The Come Up (TV series) =

2022 television documentary series

- Genre: Documentary
- Directed by: Jessica Chermayeff; Ana Veselic
- Starring: Taofeek Abijako; Fernando Casablancas; Ben Hard; Claude Shwartz; Ebon Trower; Sophia Wilson
- Country of origin: United States
- Original language: English
- No. of episodes: 8

Production
- Executive producers: Megan Sanchez-Warner; Jessica Chermayeff; Ana Veselic; Anne Alexander
- Production company: Cousins

Original release
- Network: Freeform
- Release: September 13 – September 27, 2022

The Come Up is an American eight-part television documentary series which premiered on September 13, 2022, on Freeform. The series follows six up-and-coming artists and entertainers in a "post-pandemic" New York City.

== Cast ==
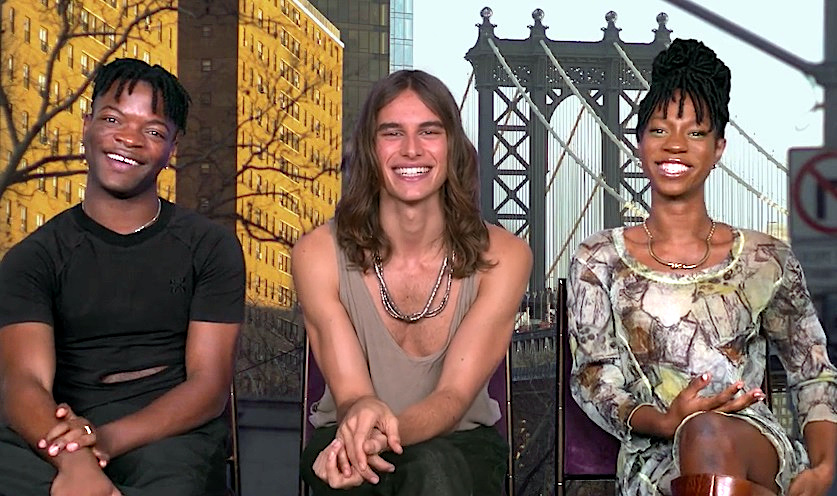
Cast of The Come Up 2022

- Taofeek Abijako, a Nigerian-born fashion designer who had become the youngest to exhibit at New York Fashion Week.
- Fernando Casablancas, the son of modeling agent John Casablancas.
- Ben Hard, a stage actor, stand-up comedian, photographer, and videographer.
- Claude Shwartz, a stage actress.
- Ebon Trower, a club promoter and fashion model.
- Sophia Wilson, a photographer.

== Production ==
On April 5, 2022, it was announced that Freeform had ordered the series under the working title Day to Night, as part of a new slate of non-scripted programming. In August 2022, the series was retitled The Come Up, and its first four episodes were set to premiere on September 13, 2022. Freeform president Tara Duncan stated that the series' cast members were "pursuing love and art on their own terms, [and] redefining what success means".

== Episodes ==
No.	Title	Original release date	U.S. viewers (millions)
1	"Bring It - Whatever 'It' Is"	September 13, 2022	N/A
2	"Jewels of the Dimes Square Crown"	September 13, 2022	N/A
3	"I Saw Your Little Kiss"	September 13, 2022	N/A
4	"The Vibe Is the Vibe Is the Vibe"	September 13, 2022	N/A
5	"Polyamory Shmamory"	September 20, 2022	0.05
6	"The Rules of Raving"	September 20, 2022	0.05
7	"Facing Ghosts"	September 27, 2022	N/A
8	"Will Anyone Show?"	September 27, 2022	N/A
