= Imara Jones =

Transgender rights activist

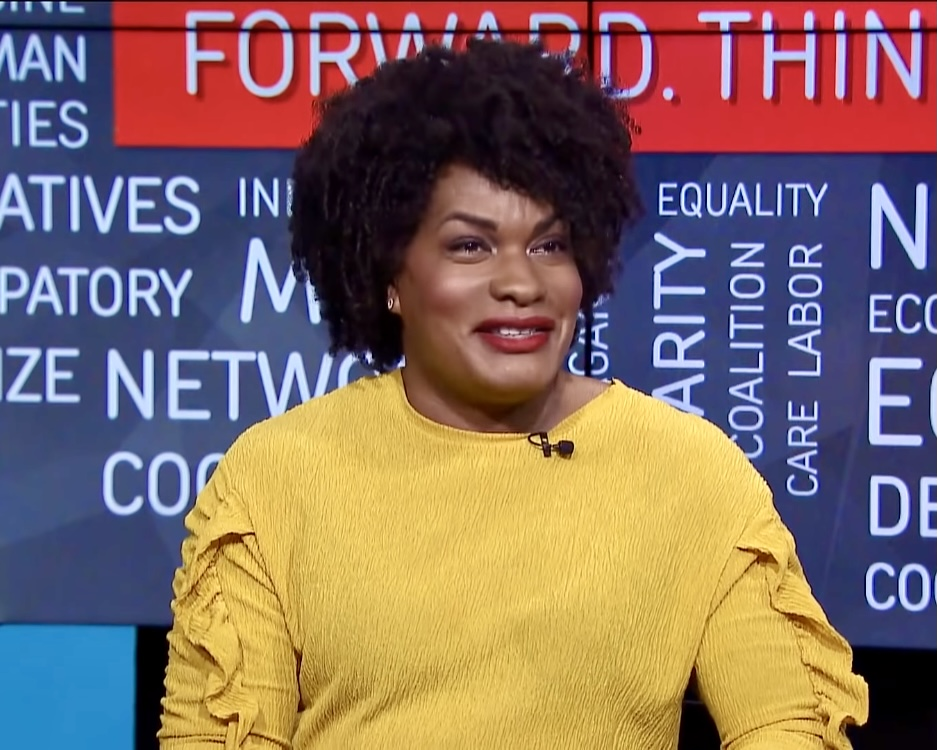
- Jones in 2018
- Education: Columbia University (BA); London School of Economics (MS)
- Occupations: Political journalist Activist
- Website: Official website

Imara Jones is an American political journalist and transgender activist who is the creator of TransLash Media, a cross-platform journalism, personal storytelling and narrative project. She was also the host of The Last Sip, a weekly, half-hour news show which targeted Millennials of color, especially women and the LGBTQ community. She is transgender.

In 2019, she chaired the first-ever United Nations High Level Meeting on Gender Diversity with over 600 participants.

Jones’ work as a host, on-air news analyst, and writer focuses on social justice and equity issues. She has been featured in a number of news outlets such as The Guardian, The Nation, MSNBC, CNBC, NPR, Mic, TheGrio, ColorLines and the In The Thick podcast. She was also interviewed for the New York City Transgender Oral History Project in collaboration with the New York Public Library.

Jones has held economic policy posts in the Clinton White House and communications positions at Viacom, where she led the award-winning Know HIV-AIDS campaign. She holds degrees from the London School of Economics and Columbia University. Jones is currently a Soros Equality Fellow and on the board of the Anti Violence Project and the New Pride Agenda.

== Education and early life ==
Jones holds an undergraduate degree in political science from Columbia University, and a master's degree in economics from the London School of Economics. Prior to her career in journalism, Jones worked on international trade policy at the Clinton White House, and as an executive at Viacom.

== Awards and titles ==
Jones has won Emmy and Peabody awards for her work. She was named a 2018 Champion of Pride by The Advocate magazine.

In 2023, Time magazine included Jones in the Time 100 list of the most influential people of 2023.
