= Generation Drag =

American television series

- Genre: Documentary
- Country of origin: United States
- Original language: English

Production
- Executive producers: Tyra Banks; Jasmine Stodel; Clinton Irey; Hayley Lozitsky; David St. John; Rob Schwarze; Ollie Brack
- Producer: Monkey Kingdom
- Production company: Discovery+

Original release
- Release: June 1, 2022

Generation Drag is a television series produced by Tyra Banks for Discovery+. The show features children ages 12 to 17 preparing for a drag ball along with their families. Reception to the show has been mixed; while some groups have praised the premise, others have criticized it and have made accusations of grooming. The show premiered on June 1, 2022.

== Background and production ==
The Dragutante drag ball was created in March 2019 by Robin Fulton, the mother of one of the contestants on the show. On April 26, 2022, a Deadline Hollywood exclusive announced the upcoming series. The series was produced by Monkey Kingdom, a subsidiary of NBCUniversal International Networks, along with Cat Fight Productions and Banks' production company Bankable Productions. Banks was listed as the executive producer along with Jasmine Stodel, Clinton Irey, Hayley Lozitsky, David St. John, Rob Schwarze, and Ollie Brack.

== Premise and performers ==
The series, "which follows five teens as they get ready for an iconic drag showcase", shows performers and their families as they prepare for Dragutante, which is held in Denver, Colorado. In a press release, Banks stated:

"I have such admiration and respect for these teens. They are bravely navigating coming into their own in a world that can be very challenging and not always accepting. What is so beautiful is seeing their parents and siblings supporting them. These teens' laser-focused tenacity inspires my team and me and we are honored to share their stories. I can't wait for these popping personalities to show their fierceness to the world."

Following are the names and ages of the performers at time of filming:

Contestant	Drag name	Age
Bailey	Nemo	15
Jameson	Ophelia Peaches	17
Nabela	Dunkashay Monroe	12
Noah	Poptart	16
Vinny	Vinessa Shimmer	12

- Bailey: Bailey Mosling is a 15-year-old transgender boy from Middleton, Wisconsin born to Luke and Dana Mosling. After expressing interest in the series through an Instagram casting call, Mosling learned his mother had already applied for him. Mosling uses he/him pronouns while out of drag and she/her pronouns while in drag as Nemo.
- Jameson: Jameson Lee is a 17-year-old writer, activist, and drag performer who started performing in drag at 13 under the name Ophelia Peaches. Robin Fulton is Lee's mother and is the founder of the Dragutante ball. Lee performed in Denver's 2019 Pride celebration.
- Nabela: Nabela is a 12-year-old transgender girl who performs under the name Dunkashay Monroe. Her family is Hispanic and traditional Catholic. She is "obsessed" with the reality television series RuPaul's Drag Race.
- Noah: Noah Montgomery is a 16-year-old transgender girl who is soft spoken and performs under the name Poptart. Her mother, Robin Montgomery, is supportive. For Poptart's first performance, her outfit was inspired by Vincent van Gogh's The Starry Night.
- Vinny: Vinny is a 12 year old boy whose bedroom is named the "Pink Palace". He performs under the name Vinessa Shimmer.

== Release ==
The series was released on the Discovery+ streaming platform on June 1, 2022, the first day of Pride Month. All six episodes were released the same day. The release was included as part of the platform's new hub called Always Proud, which features LGBT content. Other series released on the platform with Generation Drag included Trixie Motel with Trixie Mattel, and The Book of Queer.

No.	Title	Release date
1	Born This Way	June 1, 2022
2	Raising Queens	June 1, 2022
3	A Family That Slays Together	June 1, 2022
4	Just Be a Queen	June 1, 2022
5	A Wig and a Prayer	June 1, 2022
6	Getting a Little Bit Sparkly	June 1, 2022

== Reception ==
Reception for the show has been mixed. Writing for The Daily Beast, Jordan Julian stated, "...these inspiring kids [are] trailblazing against hate". Collider writer Tamera Jones stated the series "...will be full of not just glamor and sparkles but heart." Queerty stated the ball gives the children "a safe space to be their own drag superhero." Writing for The Advocate, Rachel Shatto stated the series was "heartfelt" and "feels both like a balm and a spark of hope." Screen Rant's Gina Wurtz wrote, "The new reality series will undoubtedly help other teens in the community feel seen and accepted. It will also open conversations and help parents better understand their children."

=== Criticism ===
After the series' announcement in late April, conservative media and individuals were largely critical. Politician Lauren Boebert stated the show amounted to "grooming" since it features children. She retweeted a tweet by Libs of TikTok creator Chaya Raichik with the caption "Siri, define grooming." The Advocate stated the tweet is "in keeping with the right’s current — deeply cynical and homophobic — midterm strategy of equating anything LGBTQ-related to grooming and pedophilia."

Christian Broadcasting Network writer Billy Hallowell wrote a highly critical review, stating "This tragic move [to create the show] comes amid increased debate over the impact of LGBTQ content on children. This series ups the ante on Hollywood’s presentation of such content and continues the cultural narrative of pushing back against biblical truths and norms." Jay W. Richards of The Heritage Foundation told The Christian Post "Anyone that has seen a drag queen performance recognizes that it's usually a flamboyant and highly caricatured treatment of femininity and also highly sexualized. So the very idea that you would have any kind of drag for young kids, I think it's just absolutely outrageous."

Bobby Burack of Outkick wrote, "Good to see Discovery trying to follow in the footsteps of Cuties on Netflix, another perverted show that sexualizes minors." The American Society for the Defense of Tradition, Family and Property started a petition to have the series cancelled which was signed by over 7,600 supporters.

Townhall writer Madeline Leesman called the show "moral decay", while political commentator Debra Soh stated the show would feature the contestants "pouting and gyrating while wearing little clothing" and compared the experience to a child beauty pageant.
