= Bargain Block =

- Genre: Reality; lifestyle; home improvement
- Starring: Keith Bynum; Evan Thomas; Shea Hicks-Whitfield
- Country of origin: United States
- Original language: English
- No. of seasons: 5
- No. of episodes: 38

Production
- Production locations: Detroit, Michigan
- Camera setup: Single-camera
- Running time: 60 minutes
- Production company: High Noon Entertainment

Original release
- Network: HGTV
- Release: April 14, 2021 – September 10, 2025

Bargain Block was a reality television show on HGTV following couple Keith Bynum and Evan Thomas as they buy, renovate, and design houses in Detroit. Thomas handles building and construction, while Bynum focuses on design; realtor Shea Hicks-Whitfield co-stars in the show. Bynum and Thomas often live in the houses as they work on them. It was produced by High Noon Entertainment.

Bargain Block premiered on April 14, 2021, with nine episodes. A 10-episode second season was broadcast in 2022, and the third season of Bargain Block began airing in August 2023 and featured 11 episodes. The series was cancelled after its fourth season, but 4 more episodes that were already recorded were broadcast as season 5 in August and September 2025.

== Production ==
Bynum and Thomas were first introduced to television after Bynum appeared in 2017 on an episode of Tiny Paradise ("Tiny House, Mountain Vistas").

Around 2015, Bynum was inspired to flip homes in Detroit after seeing a social media post of someone traveling there and buying ten houses. He and Thomas purchased a home in the city in 2017. They filmed a pilot episode in 2019 and the rest of the first season in 2020, when Hicks-Whitfield was brought into the production. The Detroit Land Bank Authority has said it is "extremely pleased" with the work done by Bynum and Thomas.

Bynum has an MBA from Texas Tech University, and Thomas has a PhD in physics from the University of Colorado Boulder. He and Bynum also operate a store in Detroit called Nine Design + Homes. Previously, in 2011, Bynum operated a home decor company with his sister called JoniKeith Co.
