= Family Karma =

- Also known as: Indian-ish
- Genre: Reality
- Starring: Amrit Kapai; Anisha Ramakrishna; Bali Chainani; Brian Benni; Shaan Patel; Vishal Parvani; Nicholas Kouchoukos; Richa Sadana; Dillon Patel; Rish Karam
- Country of origin: United States
- Original language: English
- No. of seasons: 3
- No. of episodes: 32

Production
- Executive producers: Steven Weinstock; Glenda Hersh; Lauren Eskelin; Michelle Schiefen; Ian Gelfand; Michael Meinecke; Lucas Howe; Swaga Deb
- Camera setup: Multi-camera
- Running time: 42 minutes
- Production company: Truly Original

Original release
- Network: Bravo
- Release: March 8, 2020 – February 26, 2023

Family Karma is an American reality television series that premiered on Bravo on March 8, 2020.

The show chronicles the lives of several Indian-American families over three generations who relocated to the Miami, Florida area around the same time.

== Cast ==
=== Timeline of cast members ===
Cast member	Seasons		
Cast member	1	2	3
Brian Benni	Main	Main	Main
Bali Chainani	Main	Main	Main
Amrit Kapai	Main	Main	Main
Vishal Parvani	Main	Main	Main
Shaan Patel	Main	Main	
Anisha Ramakrishna	Main	Main	Main
Monica Vaswani	Main	Main	Main
Rish Karam		Main	Main
Dillon Patel	Guest	Main	
Friends of the cast
Nicholas Kouchoukos	Friend	Friend	Friend
Richa Sadana	Friend	Friend	Friend
Nick Benni	Guest	Friend	
Monica Shah		Friend	

== Episodes ==
=== Series overview ===
Season	Episodes	Originally released	
Season	Episodes	First released	Last released
1	8	March 8, 2020	April 26, 2020
2	9	June 2, 2021	July 28, 2021
3	15	November 6, 2022	February 26, 2023

=== Season 1 (2020) ===
No. overall	No. in season	Title	Original release date	U.S. viewers (millions)
1	1	"Family Secrets"	March 8, 2020	0.740
A close knit group of Indian friends and their families balance modern Miami living with their traditional Indian upbringings. It's Diwali season, so that means new beginnings for Vishal and his fiancé Richa, whose two-year engagement has the entire community talking. Although Vishal proposed to Richa two years ago, their wedding has been postponed because Richa's mother doesn't approve as she wants a more traditional Indian engagement. When Vishal invites his future mother-in-law to the annual Diwali Gala, she tells multiple people at the gala her true feelings about Vishal, calling him a moron and a weak person. Meanwhile, former playboy Brian has eyes for his childhood best friend Monica, while Amrit talks about his experience of being an openly gay Indian.
2	2	"Family Fun in Flannel"	March 15, 2020	0.625
With the dirt on his family out in the open, Vishal does what he does best - sweeps it back under the rug, refusing to discuss in detail the comments his mother-in-law made about him at the gala. This doesn't sit well with his close friend Anisha who looks to her friend Bali for some no nonsense straight talk. Anisha tells Bali she feels like she is being ignored by Vishal since the gala. Later on, at a dinner with her long-distance boyfriend, O'Malley Dreisbach, and some friends, Bali tells Vishal about Anisha's feelings. Vishal and Amrit both feel Anisha is overreacting, going as far as to say that Vishal and Amrit are closer friends than Vishal and Anisha. Amrit even suggests that Anisha is only doing this because she might have a crush on Vishal. Despite the tension, it’s all smiles and flannel at a local pumpkin patch, until Brian drops a bombshell on Monica telling her his true feelings for her. Monica feels uneasy about this because she's already made her feelings to Brian known in the past and has been rejected each time.
3	3	"A Game of Telephone"	March 22, 2020	0.638
After admitting his feelings to a skeptical Monica, Brian hopes to shed his playboy label and prove they can be more than just friends. Meanwhile, Vishal and Anisha’s cold war heats up when mutual friend Bali relays damaging information to Anisha, telling her about the comments Vishal and Amrit made at the dinner party. Anisha is upset not only at the fact that she feels like Vishal and Amrit were downplaying her friendship with Vishal but also because she felt that Amrit's comments about her having a crush on Vishal implied that she is a home-wrecker.
4	4	"Sari, Not Sari"	March 29, 2020	0.611
Diwali may be a time of forgiveness, but some people missed the memo. After finding out that Bali told Anisha about the comments made at the dinner, an argument between Vishal, Amrit and Bali erupts at the annual Fire Tower celebration. Bali feels like Amrit and Vishal were both being rude and downplaying Anisha's friendship with Vishal. Vishal and Amrit on the other hand feel Bali was overreacting and making the comments made at the dinner seem worse than they actually were. Meanwhile, Amrit welcomes his boyfriend Nicholas to town for a reality check on their future and Monica finally reckons with the truth behind Brian’s unmasked feelings.
5	5	"Frienemies for Life"	April 5, 2020	0.656
After the fireworks of Diwali, Vishal hopes to repair his friendship with Anisha at Bali's Not-so-Friendsgiving. Meanwhile, you could cut the awkward tension with a carving knife as Brian puts Monica on blast for stringing him along.
6	6	"Karma's a Beach"	April 12, 2020	0.690
It's off to Key West for a weekend of fun, sun... and no parental supervision. While alpha males Brian and Shaan butt heads, Monica tests Anisha's patience with her "good girl" image. Storm clouds gather when an innocent game takes a scandalous turn, causing Monica to draw a line in the sand.
7	7	"I Kinda Don't Like You"	April 19, 2020	0.701
With his engagement eminent, Vishal prepares for the return of his mother-in-law Lopa, who badmouthed his family at the Gala. Meanwhile, Amrit throws a launch party for his new firm, but what starts as a professional event, turns into a circus when Monica, Anisha and Bali have it out in front of everyone.
8	8	"An Engagement to Remember"	April 26, 2020	0.712
Vishal and Richa's engagement party has finally arrived, and it's up to Vishal to bring the fractured families together one more time. As everyone gathers, relationships are tested when Amrit's mom introduces his boyfriend as only a "friend," and Anisha must confront the realities of her personal life, or lack thereof.

=== Season 2 (2021) ===
No. overall	No. in season	Title	Original release date	U.S. viewers (millions)
9	1	"Welcome Back Karma"	June 2, 2021	N/A
Anisha starts to secure her future by freezing her eggs; Vishal reveals a shocking secret; this tight-knit community is put to the test when an argument breaks out at Brian's 29th birthday bash.
10	2	"Not So Happy Hour"	June 9, 2021	N/A
With her egg retrieval drawing near, Anisha ponders what's next for her dating life - or lack thereof. Meanwhile, Brian tries to prove himself to Monica 2.0 with an old fashioned Guyanese coconut ritual. As the drama between Vishal and the Patel brothers continues, Auntie Happy Hour turns into an explosive cocktail mixer.
11	3	"So You Think You Can Garba?"	June 16, 2021	0.43
After months of fighting, Vishal and Richa sit down in an attempt to salvage their broken relationship. Anisha, with her eggs now successfully frozen, tests the dating waters.
12	4	"Resting Witch Face"	June 23, 2021	0.42
When Amrit and Nicholas throw a Halloween housewarming party, long simmering tensions in the friend group finally come to a head. Meanwhile, Brian begins to question his relationship, and Monica visits her mom as she tries to repair her fractured family.
13	5	"Family Blessings"	June 30, 2021	0.38
It's a Diwali to remember as Amrit prepares to come out to the matriarch of his family - his grandmother. The Aunties host a raucous high tea, while Brian and Anisha attempt a ritual to rid themselves of bad energy.
14	6	"Good Vibration"	July 7, 2021	0.46
With Anisha’s dating life flatlining, Dillon takes her to a sex shop to get her “back in the saddle.” Meanwhile, Nicholas and Amrit visit his Nani for the first time since coming out, as Brian considers harboring a secret from his new girlfriend.
15	7	"Lips Are Sealed"	July 14, 2021	0.41
With Amrit planning to propose to Nicholas, his friends and family try to keep the secret under wraps. Meanwhile, Brian copes with the loss of his job and Anisha shakes off the cobwebs and goes on a blind date.
16	8	"Checklist Please"	July 21, 2021	0.43
Monica braces for the worst when she convinces her estranged parents to have dinner together for the first time in 13 years. On the other hand, an old grudge between Lopa and Chitra rears its head and Brian finally reaches a breaking point in his relationship.
17	9	"One Last Proposal"	July 28, 2021	0.44
Vishal plans an epic week of surprises to get the ring back on Richa’s finger, but first, their moms must meet up to settle old scores. Meanwhile, Anisha considers a life away from home, and the Aunties try to “out party” the kids.

=== Season 3 (2022–23) ===
No. overall	No. in season	Title	Original release date	U.S. viewers (millions)
18	1	"My Big Fat Indian Wedding"	November 6, 2022	0.37
19	2	"Vish Gets Rich"	November 13, 2022	0.38
20	3	"The Blackout"	November 20, 2022	0.36
21	4	"Drag Me to Brunch"	November 27, 2022	0.38
22	5	"Rumor Has It"	December 4, 2022	0.49
23	6	"Bros Before Booze"	December 11, 2022	0.38
24	7	"The Dysfunctional Dinner"	December 18, 2022	0.47
25	8	"The Auntie Brunch"	January 1, 2023	0.39
26	9	"Cooked and Served"	January 8, 2023	0.37
27	10	"Project Karma"	January 15, 2023	0.40
28	11	"Analyze Vish"	January 22, 2023	0.38
29	12	"Holi Moly"	January 29, 2023	0.34
30	13	"Groomzilla"	February 5, 2023	0.28
31	14	"Wedding Woes"	February 19, 2023	0.40
32	15	"Love Wins"	February 26, 2023	0.49
