= GLAAD Media Award for Outstanding Video Game =

Award for video games

- Awarded for: Excellence in depiction of the LGBT (lesbian, gay, bisexual, and transgender) community in video games
- Venue: Varies
- Country: United States
- Presented by: GLAAD
- First award: March 28, 2019; 7 years ago
- 2026 winner(s): Lost Records: Bloom & Rage

The GLAAD Media Award for Outstanding Video Game is an annual award that honors video games for excellence in the depiction of LGBT (lesbian, gay, bisexual, and transgender) characters and themes. It is one of several categories of the annual GLAAD Media Awards, which are presented by GLAAD—an American non-governmental media monitoring organization founded in 1985—at ceremonies in New York City and Los Angeles between March and May.

The award was first given at the 30th GLAAD Media Awards in 2019 to The Elder Scrolls Online: Summerset, an expansion pack developed by ZeniMax Online Studios and published by Bethesda Softworks for The Elder Scrolls Online. The 32nd ceremony in 2021 marks the only instance where a tie has occurred, with The Last of Us Part II (developed by Naughty Dog and published by Sony Interactive Entertainment) and Tell Me Why (developed by Dontnod Entertainment and published by Xbox Game Studios) both winning the award.

For a video game to be eligible, it must contain "outstanding LGBTQ-inclusive content", consisting of LGBT characters and stories that are "authentic and impactful". An important criterion is to what extent the LGBT-inclusive content is integrated into the gameplay, specifically in regard to player agency and the game's world. Said LGBT-inclusive content must be revealed either within the game itself, or alternate media that are canonical to the game's world. Since 2021, only video games from major developers and publishers are eligible as standard, although a game from non-major developers and publishers can still be nominated if it achieves a similar level of visibility and impact to a mainstream work. If a game was released prior to the eligibility period, it can still be nominated if "substantial new first-party content" is released during the eligibility period, with said content being evaluated.

Video games selected by GLAAD are evaluated based on four criteria: "Fair, Accurate, and Inclusive Representations" of the LGBT community, "Boldness and Originality" of the project, significant "Impact" on mainstream culture, and "Overall Quality" of the project. GLAAD monitors mainstream media to identify which video games will be nominated, while also issuing a Call for Entries that encourages media outlets to submit games for consideration. Video games created by and for an LGBT audience must be submitted in order to be considered for nomination, as GLAAD does not monitor such works for defamation. Winners are determined by a plurality vote by GLAAD staff and board, Shareholders Circle members, (Note: The Shareholders Circle consists of individuals who have made a donation of $1,500 or more.) as well as volunteers and affiliated individuals. Since 2019, the award has been given to nine video games. The most current recipient of the award is Lost Records: Bloom & Rage, developed by Don't Nod, which won at the 37th GLAAD Media Awards in 2026.

The award has received some criticism, especially during 2019 and 2020, for its emphasis on mainstream Triple-A video games, which is often viewed as occurring at the expense of indie ones. Furthermore, criticism has also been aimed at the fact many of the mainstream games nominated contained minimal levels of LGBT-inclusive content and representation.

== History ==
In September 2018, GLAAD announced the introduction of a category at the GLAAD Media Awards for recognizing video games. According to Zeke Stokes, the Vice President of Programs, GLAAD had been interested in the video game medium for years. Some of the factors that led to the creation of the Outstanding Video Game category were, according to Stokes, 2017 being a turning point in the industry—given the plethora of LGBT-inclusive video games released in that year—as well as video games being one of the primary sources of entertainment for youngsters.

Stokes acknowledged that in contrast to films and television series, video games and especially Triple-A games rarely include LGBTQ characters and themes. While independent games are more inclusive of such content, GLAAD is interested in Triple-A games including LGBT themes, especially given the size of the industry. Prior to announcing the creation of the category, GLAAD had consulted various gaming studios, to ensure that the category would have "weight and meaning and attract submissions to give the industry an optimistic path forward".

In January 2019, GLAAD announced the inaugural Outstanding Video Game nominees, one of which was Assassin's Creed Odyssey. The game's Legacy of the First Blade downloadable content attracted controversy for featuring a storyline placing the player character Alexios or Kassandra in an unavoidable heterosexual relationship that results in an offspring. In a statement addressing the game's inclusion, GLAAD's Associate Director of Gaming Blair Durkee also criticized the storyline for giving the impression that sexual orientation can be changed and that LGBT individuals can "choose to conform to heteronormative expectations in spite of their identities". However, she defended the nomination of Assassin's Creed Odyssey, acknowledging that progress can be complicated and that in order to motivate video game developers and publishers to continue making "these types of bold moves in the future, we must allow for growth, acknowledge that missteps do occur, and give proper credit where credit is due".

== Winners and nominees ==
Table key
‡	Indicates the winner

Winners and nominees
Award year	Game	Developer	Publisher	Ref(s).
2019 (30th)	The Elder Scrolls Online: Summerset ‡	ZeniMax Online Studios	Bethesda Softworks	
2019 (30th)	Assassin's Creed Odyssey	Ubisoft Quebec	Ubisoft	
2019 (30th)	Guild Wars 2: Path of Fire	ArenaNet		
2019 (30th)	Pillars of Eternity II: Deadfire	Obsidian Entertainment	Versus Evil	
2019 (30th)	The Sims Mobile	Maxis	EA Mobile	
2020 (31st)	The Outer Worlds ‡	Obsidian Entertainment	Private Division	
2020 (31st)	Apex Legends	Respawn Entertainment	Electronic Arts	
2020 (31st)	Borderlands 3	Gearbox Software	2K Games	
2020 (31st)	Overwatch	Blizzard Entertainment		
2020 (31st)	The Walking Dead: The Final Season	Telltale Games; Skybound Games	Skybound Games	
2021 (32nd)	The Last of Us Part II ‡	Naughty Dog	Sony Interactive Entertainment	
2021 (32nd)	Tell Me Why ‡	Dontnod Entertainment	Xbox Game Studios	
2021 (32nd)	Assassin's Creed Valhalla	Ubisoft Montreal	Ubisoft	
2021 (32nd)	Borderlands 3: Guns, Love, and Tentacles	Gearbox Software	2K Games	
2021 (32nd)	Bugsnax	Young Horses		
2021 (32nd)	Hades	Supergiant Games		
2021 (32nd)	If Found...	Dreamfeel	Annapurna Interactive	
2021 (32nd)	Ikenfell	Happy Ray Games	Humble Games	
2021 (32nd)	Immortals Fenyx Rising	Ubisoft Quebec	Ubisoft	
2021 (32nd)	World of Warcraft: Shadowlands	Blizzard Entertainment		
2022 (33rd)	Life Is Strange: True Colors ‡	Deck Nine	Square Enix	
2022 (33rd)	Boyfriend Dungeon	Kitfox Games		
2022 (33rd)	Far Cry 6	Ubisoft Toronto	Ubisoft	
2022 (33rd)	The Gardener and the Wild Vines	Finite Reflection Studios		
2022 (33rd)	Kena: Bridge of Spirits	Ember Lab		
2022 (33rd)	Psychonauts 2	Double Fine	Xbox Game Studios	
2022 (33rd)	Rainbow Billy: The Curse of the Leviathan	ManaVoid Entertainment	Skybound Games	
2022 (33rd)	Tom Clancy's Rainbow Six Siege	Ubisoft Montreal	Ubisoft	
2022 (33rd)	Unpacking	Witch Beam	Humble Games	
2022 (33rd)	Unsighted	Studio Pixel Punk	Humble Games	
2023 (34th)	Apex Legends ‡	Respawn Entertainment	Electronic Arts	
2023 (34th)	Desta: The Memories Between	Ustwo		
2023 (34th)	Haven	The Game Bakers		
2023 (34th)	I Was a Teenage Exocolonist	Northway Games	Finji	
2023 (34th)	Need for Speed Unbound	Criterion Games	Electronic Arts	
2023 (34th)	Signalis	rose-engine	Humble Games	
2023 (34th)	The Quarry	Supermassive Games	2K	
2023 (34th)	Tiny Tina's Wonderlands	Gearbox Software	2K	
2023 (34th)	World of Warcraft: Dragonflight	Blizzard Entertainment		
2023 (34th)	Wylde Flowers	Studio Drydock		
2024 (35th)	Baldur's Gate 3 ‡	Larian Studios		
2024 (35th)	Goodbye Volcano High	KO_OP		
2024 (35th)	Horizon Forbidden West: Burning Shores	Guerrilla Games	Sony Interactive Entertainment	
2024 (35th)	Little Goody Two Shoes	AstralShift	Square Enix	
2024 (35th)	Overwatch 2	Blizzard Entertainment		
2024 (35th)	Stray Gods: The Roleplaying Musical	Summerfall Studios	Humble Games	
2024 (35th)	Tchia	Awaceb		
2024 (35th)	Thirsty Suitors	Outerloop Games	Annapurna Interactive	
2024 (35th)	This Bed We Made	Lowbirth Games		
2024 (35th)	Too Hot to Handle 2	Nanobit	Netflix	
2025 (36th)	Dragon Age: The Veilguard ‡	BioWare	Electronic Arts	
2025 (36th)	Caravan SandWitch	Studio Plane Toast	Dear Villagers	
2025 (36th)	Dread Delusion	Lovely Hellplace	DreadXP	
2025 (36th)	Dustborn	Red Thread Games	Spotlight by Quantic Dream	
2025 (36th)	Fear the Spotlight	Cozy Game Pals	Blumhouse Games	
2025 (36th)	Life is Strange: Double Exposure	Deck Nine	Square Enix	
2025 (36th)	Minds Beneath Us	BearBone Studio		
2025 (36th)	Paper Mario: The Thousand-Year Door	Intelligent Systems	Nintendo	
2025 (36th)	Sorry We’re Closed	à la mode games	Akupara Games	
2025 (36th)	Until Then	Polychroma Games	Maximum Entertainment	
2026 (37th)	Lost Records: Bloom and Rage ‡	Don't Nod		
2026 (37th)	Ambrosia Sky: Act One	Soft Rains		
2026 (37th)	Assassin's Creed Shadows	Ubisoft		
2026 (37th)	The August Before	Silly Little Games	Catoptric Games	
2026 (37th)	Cabernet	Party for Introverts	Akupara Games	
2026 (37th)	The Great Villainess: Strategy of Lily	One or Eight	Alliance Arts	
2026 (37th)	Hades II	Supergiant Games		
2026 (37th)	Old Skies	Wadjet Eye Games		
2026 (37th)	Road to Empress	New One Studio		
2026 (37th)	The Roottrees are Dead	Evil Trout Inc.		

== Criticism ==
Following the category's announcement, Polygon's Owen S. Good lamented that, given the award's eligibility criteria, indie games inclusive of LGBT characters and themes such as Tacoma, Butterfly Soup, and Dream Daddy could not be nominated. CJ Adriessen of Destructoid was disappointed by the inaugural nominees in 2019, arguing that The Missing: J.J. Macfield and the Island of Memories deserved a nomination given its positive and respectful representation of trans people, and described the game's exclusion as having "le[ft] a rotten taste in [his] mouth".

Also discussing the category's inaugural nominees, Jay Castello of Rock Paper Shotgun criticized the inclusion of Assassin's Creed Odyssey, particularly in light of its Legacy of the First Blade DLC. Castello argued that—especially given GLAAD's own criticisms of the DLC—Odyssey "wasn't, in fact, 'outstanding'", pointing out that all optional love interests in it are playersexual, and how the game does not offer enough same-sex options for Alexios. Furthermore, they argued that indie games such as Heaven Will Be Mine and Hardcoded, which deal heavily with LGBT themes and are made by LGBTQ+ people—unlike Assassin's Creed Odyssey and The Elder Scrolls Online: Summerset—were more deserving of recognition.

Imogen Beckhelling, also of Rock Paper Shotgun, would go on to criticize the 2020 nominees, arguing that it is still "missing the point", pointing out how in Overwatch both Tracer and Soldier: 76 are revealed to be queer only in the tie-in comics, outside of the game. While Beckhelling believed that LGBT representation in video games is important, and progress in Triple-A games should be celebrated, she argued that indie games deserve more recognition, singling out Heart of the Woods for praise.

Regarding the 2022 ceremony, Jade King described the nominees as consisting of "both triple-A titles and indie hits". While King acknowledged some of the nominees' representation was minimal and the games were included likely to "make up the numbers", she recognized that progress is not a linear process, and described the list as being well-founded.
