= 33rd GLAAD Media Awards =

Annual US media awards ceremony

- Date: April 2, 2022; May 6, 2022
- Location: The Beverly Hilton (Beverly Hills, California); New York Hilton Midtown (New York, New York)
- Country: United States
- Hosted by: Bob the Drag Queen; Eureka O'Hara; Shangela

The 33rd GLAAD Media Awards is a 2022 annual presentation of the GLAAD Media Awards, presented by GLAAD honoring the 2021 media season. It was held on April 2, 2022 in Los Angeles and was later held on May 6, 2022 in New York City. The awards honor films, television shows, video games, musicians and works of journalism that fairly, accurately and inclusively represent the LGBT community and issues relevant to the community. GLAAD announced the 198 nominees split across 28 categories on January 19, 2022 on TikTok. For the first time since 2019, the winners were announced in an in-person ceremony. Michaela Jaé Rodriguez, Kacey Musgraves, Judith Light and Wilson Cruz received special recognition awards for their advocacy.

== Nominees ==
The nominees were announced on GLAAD's TikTok page on January 19, 2022.

Once announced, winners once will be listed first, highlighted in boldface, and indicated with a double dagger (‡).

=== Film ===
**Outstanding Film – Wide Release**: **Eternals (Walt Disney Studios Motion Pictures)**‡; Everybody's Talking About Jamie (Amazon Studios); The Mitchells vs. the Machines (Netflix); tick, tick... BOOM! (Netflix); West Side Story (Walt Disney Studios Motion Pictures)	**Outstanding Film – Limited Release**: **Parallel Mothers (Sony Pictures Classics)**‡; Breaking Fast (Vertical Entertainment); Gossamer Folds (Indican Pictures); The Obituary of Tunde Johnson (Wolfe Video); Plan B (Hulu); Port Authority (Momentum Pictures); Shiva Baby (Utopia); Swan Song (Magnolia Pictures); Tu Me Manques (Dark Star Pictures); Twilight's Kiss (Strand Releasing)

=== Television ===
**Outstanding Documentary**: **Changing the Game (Hulu)**‡; Cured (PBS/Independent Lens); Flee (NEON); The Lady and the Dale (HBO); The Legend of the Underground (HBO); No Ordinary Man (Oscilloscope Laboratories); Nuclear Family (HBO); Pier Kids (PBS/POV); Pray Away (Netflix); Pride (FX)	**Outstanding Comedy Series**: **Saved by the Bell (Peacock)**‡; Dickinson (Apple TV+); Gentefied (Netflix); Love, Victor (Hulu); The Other Two (HBO Max); Sex Education (Netflix); Shrill (Hulu); Special (Netflix); Twenties (BET); Work in Progress (Showtime)
**Outstanding Drama Series**: **Pose (FX)**‡; 9-1-1: Lone Star (FOX); Batwoman (The CW); The Chi (Showtime); Doom Patrol (HBO Max); Good Trouble (Freeform); Grey's Anatomy (ABC); The L Word: Generation Q (Showtime); Star Trek: Discovery (Paramount+); Supergirl (The CW)	**Outstanding New TV Series**: **Hacks (HBO Max)**‡; 4400 (The CW); Chucky (Syfy/USA Network); Harlem (Amazon Prime Video); The Long Call (BritBox); The Sex Lives of College Girls (HBO Max); Sort Of (HBO Max); With Love (Amazon Prime Video); Y: The Last Man (FX); Yellowjackets (Showtime)
**Outstanding TV Movie**: **Single All the Way (Netflix)**‡; The Christmas House 2: Deck Those Halls (Hallmark Channel); The Fear Street Trilogy (Netflix); Nash Bridges (USA Network); Under the Christmas Tree (Lifetime)	**Outstanding Limited or Anthology Series**: **It's a Sin (HBO Max)**‡; Dopesick (Hulu); Halston (Netflix); Little Birds (Starz); Love Life (HBO Max); Master of None Presents: Moments in Love (Netflix); Rūrangi (Hulu); Station Eleven (HBO Max); Vigil (Peacock); The White Lotus (HBO)
**Outstanding Reality Program**: **RuPaul's Drag Race (VH1)**‡ (TIE); **We're Here (HBO)**‡ (TIE); 12 Dates of Christmas (HBO Max); Dancing with the Stars (ABC); Family Karma (Bravo); I Am Jazz (TLC); Legendary (HBO Max); MTV's Following: Bretman Rock (MTV); Queer Eye (Netflix); The Voice (NBC)	**Outstanding Children's Programming**: **"Family Day" – Sesame Street (HBO Max)**‡; "Berry Bounty Banquet - Part 2" – Strawberry Shortcake: Berry in the Big City (WildBrain Studios/YouTube Kids); City of Ghosts (Netflix); "Gonzo-rella" – Muppet Babies (Disney Junior); "Joie de Jonathan" – Fancy Nancy (Disney Junior); Ridley Jones (Netflix); Rugrats (Paramount+); Summer Camp Island (Cartoon Network/HBO Max); We The People (Netflix); "Whatever Floats Your Float" – Madagascar: A Little Wild (Hulu/Peacock)
**Outstanding Kids and Family Programming**: **Power Rangers Dino Fury (Nickelodeon/Netflix)**‡; Amphibia (Disney Channel); Centaurworld (Netflix); "Claudia and the Sad Goodbye" – The Baby-Sitters Club (Netflix); Diary of a Future President (Disney+); Doogie Kameāloha, M.D. (Disney+); High School Musical: The Musical: The Series (Disney+); The Loud House (Nickelodeon); "Manlee Men" – Danger Force (Nickelodeon); The Owl House (Disney Channel)	**Outstanding Variety or Talk Show Episode**: **"Elliot Page" – The Oprah Conversation (Apple TV+)**‡; "Bisexual Superman Is Not Ruining Your Childhood, B*tch Please" – The Amber Ruffin Show (Peacock); "Culture War! Diverse Pilots and Trans Rights" – The Daily Show with Trevor Noah (Comedy Central); "Jenny Hagel Investigates Why America's Lesbian Bars Are Vanishing" – Late Night with Seth Meyers (NBC); "Mj Rodriguez on Historic Emmy Nomination and Hopes for Trans Community's Future" – The View (ABC)

=== Journalism ===
**Outstanding TV Journalism Segment**: **"HIV/AIDS: 40 Years Later" – Today (NBC)** ‡; "Capehart Condemns Marjorie Taylor Greene's Transphobic Speech Against Equality Act" – The Sunday Show with Jonathan Capehart (MSNBC); "Danica Roem to LGBTQ Americans: You Have to Care About Politics" – State of the Union (CNN); "McBride On Anti-Trans Bills: 'This Is Legislative Bullying Plain & Simple'" – Stephanie Ruhle Reports (MSNBC); "Valedictorian Says His Graduation Speech on Mental Health & LGBTQ Identity Was Cut Off" – GMA3: What You Need To Know (ABC)	**Outstanding TV Journalism – Long-Form**: **"Pride of The White House" (MSNBC)** ‡; "Anderson Speaks to Legendary AIDS and Gay Rights Activist" – Anderson Cooper Full Circle (CNNgo); "Gay Panic" – This is Life with Lisa Ling (CNN); "Life After Pulse" (WESH); "Mama Gloria" AfroPop: The Ultimate Cultural Exchange (PBS); "PRIDE on ABC News Live: What's Next for the LGBTQ+ Community" (ABC News Live); "Trans in Texas" – United Shades of America (CNN); Trans in Trumpland (Topic); "TransAmerica" – (NBC News NOW); "The Week in Pride" – The Week with Joshua Johnson (MSNBC)
**Outstanding Print Article**: **"Lawmakers Can't Cite Local Examples of Trans Girls in Sports" by David Crary & Lindsay Whitehurst (The Associated Press)** ‡; "Billy Porter Breaks a 14-Year Silence: 'This Is What HIV-Positive Looks Like Now'" by Billy Porter, as told by Lacey Rose (The Hollywood Reporter); "Books Probed by a Texas Lawmaker by Women, People of Color, LGBTQ Writers. They're Asking: 'Really?'" by Talia Richman & Corbett Smith (The Dallas Morning News); "Bowen Yang is Defining Funny for a New Generation" by David Canfield (Entertainment Weekly); "Diary of an ICE Detainee" by Yariel Valdes Gonzalez (Washington Blade); "Elliot Page is Ready for This Moment" by Katy Steinmetz (TIME); "The Hearts of Venezuela" by Taylor Hirschberg (Out); "Inside the Sparkling, Rainbow-Filled World of JoJo Siwa" by Jason Sheeler (People); "Keeping Trans Kids From Medicine Doesn't Make Them Disappear" by Jennifer Finney Boylan (The New York Times); "The Year of the Black Queer Revolution" by Ernest Owens (Rolling Stone)
**Outstanding Magazine Overall Coverage**: **The Advocate**‡; Entertainment Weekly; People; POZ; Variety
**Outstanding Online Journalism Article**: **"'No Time For Intolerance:' Dr. Rachel Levine Has A Job To Do" by Dawn Ennis (Forbes.com)** ‡; "Across the South, a Trans Housing Movement Grows" by Raquel Willis (VOGUE.com); "As Anti-Trans Violence Surges, Advocates Demand Policy Reform" by Jo Yurcaba (NBCNews.com); "Let's Talk About (Queer) Sex: The Importance of LGBTQ-inclusive Sex Education in Schools" by David Oliver (USAToday.com); "LGBT+ Afghans Fear Being Forgotten 100 Days Since Taliban Takeover" by Hugo Greenhalgh (Openlynews.com); "Megan Rohrer, the Evangelical Lutheran Church's First Trans Bishop, Wants to Get Messy" by Nico Lang (them.us); "No, DaBaby, HIV Will Not 'Make You Die in 2 to 3 weeks.' Here's the Truth." by David Artavia (Yahoo.com); "T.J. Osborne is Ready to Tell His Story" by Sam Lansky (TIME.com); "What I've Learned After Living with HIV in Secret for Years" by Tony Morrison (GoodMorningAmerica.com); "The Word Missing From the Vast Majority of Anti-Trans Legislation? Transgender" by Orion Rummler & Kate Sosin (19thnews.org)
**Outstanding Online Journalism – Video or Multimedia**: **"Transnational" [series] by Eva Reign, Alyza Enriquez, Freddy McConnell, Vivek Kemp, Courtney Brooks, Sarah Burke, Hendrik Hinzel, Alyza Enriquez, Dan Ming, Trey Strange, and Daisy Wardell (VICE News)** ‡; "+Talk: HIV & Faith" by Karl Schmid, Mike Spierer, Brent Zacky, and Victor Barreiro (Plus Life Media); "Caretakers" [series] by Geena Rocero, Jon Mallow, Dan Greenberg, Sheena Alexis Suarez, Erin McIntyre, Chelsea Rugg, Shant Alexander, and Victoria Malabrigo (PBS.com); "Covid Confessions: Drag Performers Share Their Experiences Working During The Pandemic" by Alec Fischer (Fischr Media); "For Ruth Ellis Center Staff, Helping LGBTQ Homeless Youth is Personal" by Scott Gatz, John Halbach, Maria Tridas, and Emily Geraghty (LGBTQ Nation); "How Queer Characters Have Evolved In Children's Animation" by Chris Snyder, Kyle Desiderio, Jess Chou, A.C. Fowler, Kuwilileni Hauwanga, Abbey White, and Kalai Chik (Insider); "Legendary" [series] by Peppermint, Matt McDonough, Jennifer Tiexiera, Michael Seligman, Julia Hoff, Ryan Murray, Ximena Sanchez, and Tom Lofthouse (NowThis/Discovery+); "Meet the Logo Legends: Brooklyn Trans Liberation" by Terron Moore, Sean Devaney, Sam Manzella, Christopher Rudolph, and Zachary O'Connor (Logo); "The Power of Layshia Clarendon" by Katie Barnes, Jennifer Karson-Strauss, Andy Sharp, and Jennifer Holt (ESPN.com); "Tyra Banks Interview: SI Swimsuit Cover Model Leyna Bloom" (Sports Illustrated Swimsuit)

=== Other ===
**Outstanding Broadway Production**: **Company** ‡; **Thoughts of a Colored Man** ‡; Chicken & Biscuits	**Outstanding Video Game**: **Life Is Strange: True Colors (Deck Nine Games/Square Enix)**‡; Boyfriend Dungeon (Kitfox Games); Far Cry 6 (Ubisoft); The Gardener and the Wild Vines (Finite Reflection Studios); Kena: Bridge of Spirits (Ember Lab); Psychonauts 2 (Double Fine/Xbox Game Studios); Rainbow Billy: The Curse of the Leviathan (ManaVoid Entertainment/Skybound Games); Tom Clancy's Rainbow Six Siege (Ubisoft); Unpacking (Witch Beam/Humble Games); Unsighted (Studio Pixel Punk/Humble Games)
**Outstanding Graphic Novel/Anthology**: **Cheer Up! Love and Pompoms, by Crystal Frasier, Val Wise, Oscar O. Jupiter (Oni Press)**‡; DC Pride [anthology] (DC Comics); Eighty Days, by A.C. Esguerra (Archaia/BOOM! Studios); The Girl from the Sea, by Lee Knox Ostertag, Maarta Laiho (Graphix/Scholastic); Girl Haven, by Lilah Sturges, Meaghan Carter, Joamette Gil (Oni Press); I Am Not Starfire, by Mariko Tamaki, Yoshi Yoshitani, Aditya Bidikar (DC Comics); Marvel's Voices: Pride [anthology] (Marvel Comics); Renegade Rule, by Ben Kahn, Rachel Silverstein, Sam Beck, Jim Campbell (Dark Horse Comics); The Secret to Superhuman Strength, by Alison Bechdel, Holly Rae Taylor (Mariner Books/HMH); Shadow Life, by Hiromi Goto, Ann Xu (First Second/Macmillan)	**Outstanding Comic Book**: **Crush and Lobo by Mariko Tamaki (DC Comics)**‡; Aquaman: The Becoming by Brandon Thomas (DC Comics); Barbalien: Red Planet by Tate Brombal and Jeff Lemire (Dark Horse Comics); The Dreaming: Waking Hours by G. Willow Wilson (DC Comics); Guardians of the Galaxy by Al Ewing (Marvel Comics); Harley Quinn: The Animated Series - The Eat. Bang! Kill. Tour by Tee Franklin (DC Comics); Killer Queens by David M. Booher (Dark Horse Comics); Star Wars: Doctor Aphra by Alyssa Wong (Marvel Comics); Superman: Son of Kal-El by Tom Taylor (DC Comics); Wynd by James Tynion IV (Boom! Studios)
**Outstanding Music Artist**: **Lil Nas X, Montero (Columbia Records)** ‡; Brandi Carlile, In These Silent Days (Low Country Sound/Elektra Records); Brockhampton, Roadrunner: New Light, New Machine (RCA Records/Question Everything); Demi Lovato, Dancing with the Devil... the Art of Starting Over (Island Records); Elton John, The Lockdown Sessions (Interscope Records); Halsey, If I Can't Have Love, I Want Power (Capitol Records); Kaytranada, Intimidated (RCA Records); Melissa Etheridge, One Way Out (BMG); Mykki Blanco, Broken Hearts and Beauty Sleep (Transgressive Records); St. Vincent, Daddy's Home (Loma Vista Recordings)	**Outstanding Breakthrough Music Artist**: **Lily Rose, Stronger Than I Am (Big Loud Records/Back Blocks Music/Republic Records)**‡; Arlo Parks, Collapsed in Sunbeams (Transgressive Records); Asiahn, The Interlude (Third&Hayden/Motown); Girl in Red, If I Could Make It Go Quiet (AWAL); Jake Wesley Rogers, Pluto (Facet/Warner Records); Japanese Breakfast, Jubilee (Dead Oceans); Joy Oladokun, In Defense of My Own Happiness (Amigo Records/Verve Forecast/Republic Records); Lauren Jauregui, Prelude (Attunement Records/AWAL); Lucy Dacus, Home Video (Matador Records); Vincint, There Will Be Tears (Vincint Cannady)
**Outstanding Blog**: **Pittsburgh Lesbian Correspondents** ‡; Holy Bullies and Headless Monsters; Mombian; My Fabulous Disease; The Reckoning

=== Spanish Language ===
**Outstanding Spanish-Language Scripted Television Series**: **Maricón perdido (HBO Max)**‡; #Luimelia (Atresplayer Premium); Manual Para Galanes (Pantaya); Pequeñas Victorias (ViacomCBS International Studios/Oficina Burman/Amazon Prime Video); Todo lo otro (HBO Max)	**Outstanding Spanish-Language TV Journalism**: **"Orgullo LGBTQ: 52 Años de Lucha y Evolución" (WNJU/Telemundo 47)**‡; "Grupo Firme en Contra del Acoso" – Despierta América (Univision); "El Mes del Orgullo" (CNN en Español); "Impacto Positivo: Bamby Salcedo" – Primer Impacto (Univision); "Preocupa Exclusión de Niñas Trans en Equipos Femeninos" – Hoy Día (Telemundo)
**Outstanding Spanish-Language Online Journalism Article**: **"Claudia: La Enfermera Trans que Lucha Contra el Covid en Ciudad Juárez" for Louisa Reynolds (Nexos)** ‡; **"Somos Invisibles": La Discriminación y los Riesgos se Multiplican para los Indígenas LGBTQ+" for Albinson Linares (Telemundo)** ‡; "Anacaona Reyes: Visibiliza a la Comunidad Trans y Educa Desde el Capitolio" por Maricarmen Rivera (El Vocero); "Ana Macho: Sobre Hacer Música Que Rebasa Límites" for Ronald Avila (El Nuevo Día); "Ángel Cruz Aprendió a "Desaprender" los Credos Sociales" for José Karlo Pagán Negrón (Primera Hora); "Así Viven la Menstruación los Hombres Trans" for Miriam Martínez (Vice); "Casa Frida Rescata a Pareja Gay de Homofobia en Jamaica" for Edgar Ulises (Homosensual.com); "En Casa con Kany García y Jocelyn Trochez" for Carole Joseph (People en Español); "Oyuki, la Madre Trans de Seis Hijos que Rompe Prejuicios en México" for Eduard Ribas i Admetlla (EFE); "Una Vida Transgénero: 'Es Momento de que nos Dejemos Ver'" for Marcos Billy Guzman (El Nuevo Día)	**Outstanding Spanish-Language Online Journalism – Video or Multimedia**: **"Expulsados México: Cómo la Comunidad Transgénero se Unió para Ayudar a los Migrantes" for Patricia Clarembaux, Anna Clare Spelman, y Celemente Sánchez (Univision Noticias)** ‡; "Alexa: Su Vida y la Justicia que no llega a un Año de su Asesinato" for Marcos Billy Guzmán y Adlín González (El Nuevo Día); "Marcha del Orgullo LGBTI: Día de Festejo, Pero También de Protesta" for Jair Cabrera Torres (La Jornada); "Ser Mujer, ser Trans y ser Mapuche" for Natalia Barrera Francis, Paula Daibert, and Claudia Escobar (AJ+ Español); "Vogue en el Paro Nacional y Transmilenio: ¿Qué hay detrás?" for Jahira Quintero, Pilar Cuartas Rodríguez, Laura Salomón, Dani Jara, Piisciiss, Nova and Axid (La Disidencia - El Espectador)

=== Special Recognition ===
**Special Recognition**: All Boys Aren't Blue by George Matthew Johnson [filmed reading + performance]; Alok Vaid-Menon – 4D with Demi Lovato (Cadence13/OBB Sound/SB Projects); CODED: The Hidden Love of J.C. Leyendecker (Paramount+); Jeopardy! Champion Amy Schneider; The Laverne Cox Show (Shondaland Audio/iHeartMedia); Life Out Loud with LZ Granderson (ABC News); Outsports' Coverage of the Tokyo 2020 Olympics and Paralympics	**Special Recognition (Spanish-Language)**: Celebrando el Mes del Orgullo (Telemundo)

- Stephen F. Kolzak Award: Michaela Jaé Rodriguez
- Vanguard Award: Kacey Musgraves
- Excellence in Media Award: Judith Light
- GLAAD Vito Russo Award: Wilson Cruz
