= GLAAD Media Award for Outstanding Limited or Anthology Series =

Annual US television award

- Awarded for: Excellence in depiction of the LGBT (lesbian, gay, bisexual, and transgender) community in miniseries / anthology series
- Venue: Varies
- Country: United States
- Presented by: GLAAD
- Currently held by: Wayward (2026)

The GLAAD Media Award for Outstanding Limited or Anthology Series is an annual award that honors miniseries and anthology series for excellence in the treatment of LGBT (lesbian, gay, bisexual, and transgender) characters and themes. It is one of several categories of the annual GLAAD Media Awards, which are presented by GLAAD—an American non-governmental media monitoring organization—at ceremonies held primarily in New York City and Los Angeles between March and May.

GLAAD recognized the ABC miniseries The Women of Brewster Place at the 1st GLAAD Media Awards in 1990. In 1994, Fox's Doing Time on Maple Drive became the first television film to be recognized by GLAAD, in the Outstanding TV Movies category. Following this, various television films and miniseries would be recognized as separate categories. By the 14th GLAAD Media Awards, in 2003, GLAAD merged the two categories into one named Outstanding Television Film, with HBO's film The Laramie Project winning. At the 19th GLAAD Media Awards in 2008, the category was expanded to also include anthology series, with Here's The DL Chronicles winning. The award remained as such until the 31st GLAAD Media Awards in 2020, where it was separated into two distinct categories: one for television films, the other for limited or anthology series. Further changes took place in 2023 during the 34th GLAAD Media Awards, where television films became part of the Outstanding Film – Streaming or TV category. Despite these reorganizations, GLAAD considers the television films recognized from 2020 to 2022 as part of this award category.

For a limited or anthology series to be eligible, it must include at least one LGBT character in a leading, supporting, or recurring capacity. The award may be accepted by any of the series' producers, writers, or actors. Limited and anthology series selected by GLAAD are evaluated based on four criteria: "Fair, Accurate, and Inclusive Representations" of the LGBT community, "Boldness and Originality" of the project, significant "Impact" on mainstream culture, and "Overall Quality" of the project. GLAAD monitors mainstream media to identify which series will be nominated, while also issuing a Call for Entries that encourages media outlets to submit programmes for consideration. By contrast, in order for series created by and for LGBT audiences to be considered for nomination, they must be submitted after the Call for Entries. Winners are determined by a plurality vote by GLAAD staff and its board, Shareholders Circle members, (Note: The Shareholders Circle consists of individuals who have made a donation of $1,500 or more.) volunteers and affiliated individuals.

Since its inception, the award has been given to 37 works. The only anthology series to have received multiple nominations are FX's American Horror Story and HBO's The White Lotus, both of which have only won once. American Horror Story won for its second season—subtitled Asylum—in 2013, while The White Lotus won for its second season at the 34th GLAAD Media Awards in 2023.

== Winners and nominations ==
Table key
‡	Indicates the winner

=== 1990s ===
1990s winners and nominees
Award year	Work	Network	Ref(s).
1990 (1st)	The Women of Brewster Place ‡	ABC	
1991 (Note: Given as a Vito Russo Film Award) (2nd)	Oranges Are Not the Only Fruit ‡	PBS	
1993 (4th)	Doing Time on Maple Drive ‡	Fox	
1994 (5th)	And the Band Played On ‡	HBO	
1995 (6th)	Tales of the City ‡	PBS	
1996 (7th)	Serving in Silence: The Margarethe Cammermeyer Story ‡	NBC	
1997 (8th)	Two Mothers for Zachary ‡	ABC	
1997 (8th)	Losing Chase	Showtime	
1998 (9th)	Any Mother's Son ‡	Lifetime	
1998 (9th)	Breaking the Code	PBS	
1998 (9th)	In the Gloaming	HBO	
1998 (9th)	The Twilight of the Golds	Showtime	
1999 (10th)	More Tales of the City ‡	Showtime	
1999 (10th)	Blind Faith	Showtime	
1999 (10th)	Gia	HBO	
1999 (10th)	Labor of Love	Lifetime	
1999 (10th)	My Own Country	Showtime	

=== 2000s ===
2000s winners and nominees
Award year	Work	Network	Ref(s).
2000 (11th)	Execution of Justice ‡	Showtime	
2000 (11th)	The Unknown Cyclist	Starz	
2001 (12th)	If These Walls Could Talk 2 ‡	HBO	
2001 (12th)	Chutney Popcorn	Sundance TV	
2001 (12th)	Common Ground	Showtime	
2001 (12th)	Holiday Heart	Showtime	
2001 (12th)	The Truth About Jane	Lifetime	
2002 (13th)	What Makes a Family ‡	Lifetime	
2002 (13th)	Anatomy of a Hate Crime	MTV	
2002 (13th)	Further Tales of the City	Showtime	
2002 (13th)	A Glimpse of Hell	FX	
2002 (13th)	Stranger Inside	HBO	
2003 (14th)	The Laramie Project ‡	HBO	
2003 (14th)	The Badge	Starz	
2003 (14th)	Bobbie's Girl	Showtime	
2003 (14th)	The Matthew Shepard Story	NBC	
2004 (15th)	Angels in America ‡	HBO	
2004 (15th)	Cambridge Spies	BBC America	
2004 (15th)	Normal	HBO	
2004 (15th)	Soldier's Girl	Showtime	
2004 (15th)	Tipping the Velvet	BBC America	
2005 (16th)	Jack ‡	Showtime	
2005 (16th)	The Blackwater Lightship	CBS	
2006 (17th)	The Long Firm ‡	BBC America	
2006 (17th)	Partner(s)	Lifetime	
2007 (18th)	A Girl Like Me: The Gwen Araujo Story ‡	Lifetime	
2007 (18th)	Wedding Wars	A&E	
2008 (19th)	The DL Chronicles ‡	Here	
2008 (19th)	Daphne	Logo	
2008 (19th)	The State Within	BBC America	
2009 (20th)	East Side Story ‡	Logo	
2009 (20th)	Affinity	Logo	
2009 (20th)	Ice Blues: A Donald Strachey Mystery	Here	
2009 (20th)	Oh Happy Day	Logo	
2009 (20th)	On the Other Hand, Death: A Donald Strachey Mystery	Here	

=== 2010s ===
2010s winners and nominees
Award year	Work	Network	Ref(s).
2010 (21st)	Prayers for Bobby ‡	Lifetime	
2010 (21st)	An Englishman in New York	Logo	
2010 (21st)	Pedro	MTV	
2010 (21st)	Torchwood: Children of Earth	BBC America	
2012 (23rd)	Cinema Verite ‡	HBO	
2013 (24th)	American Horror Story: Asylum ‡	FX	
2013 (24th)	Hit & Miss	Audience	
2013 (24th)	Political Animals	USA	
2014 (25th)	Behind the Candelabra ‡	HBO	
2014 (25th)	In the Flesh	BBC America	
2015 (26th)	The Normal Heart ‡	HBO	
2016 (27th)	Bessie ‡	HBO	
2016 (27th)	Banana	Logo	
2016 (27th)	Cucumber	Logo	
2017 (28th)	Eyewitness ‡	USA	
2017 (28th)	London Spy	BBC America	
2017 (28th)	Looking: The Movie	HBO	
2017 (28th)	The Rocky Horror Picture Show: Let's Do the Time Warp Again	Fox	
2017 (28th)	Vicious: The Finale	PBS	
2018 (29th)	When We Rise ‡	ABC	
2018 (29th)	American Horror Story: Cult	FX	
2018 (29th)	Feud: Bette and Joan	FX	
2018 (29th)	Godless	Netflix	
2018 (29th)	Queers	BBC America	
2019 (30th)	The Assassination of Gianni Versace: American Crime Story ‡	FX	
2019 (30th)	American Horror Story: Apocalypse	FX	
2019 (30th)	Life-Size 2	Freeform	
2019 (30th)	Sense8: Amor Vincit Omnia	Netflix	
2019 (30th)	A Very English Scandal	Amazon	

=== 2020s ===
2020s winners and nominees
Award year	Work	Network	Ref(s).
2020 (31st)	Limited Series		
2020 (31st)	Tales of the City ‡	Netflix	
2020 (31st)	Mrs. Fletcher	HBO	
2020 (31st)	The Red Line	CBS	
2020 (31st)	When They See Us	Netflix	
2020 (31st)	Years and Years	HBO	
2020 (31st)	TV Movie		
2020 (31st)	Transparent: Musical Finale ‡	Amazon Prime Video	
2020 (31st)	Deadwood: The Movie	HBO	
2020 (31st)	Let It Snow	Netflix	
2020 (31st)	Rent: Live	Fox	
2020 (31st)	Trapped: The Alex Cooper Story	Lifetime	
2021 (32nd)	Limited Series		
2021 (32nd)	I May Destroy You ‡	HBO	
2021 (32nd)	Dispatches from Elsewhere	AMC	
2021 (32nd)	The Haunting of Bly Manor	Netflix	
2021 (32nd)	Hollywood	Netflix	
2021 (32nd)	Little Fires Everywhere	Hulu	
2021 (32nd)	TV Movie		
2021 (32nd)	Uncle Frank ‡	Amazon Studios	
2021 (32nd)	Alice Júnior	Netflix	
2021 (32nd)	Bad Education	HBO	
2021 (32nd)	The Christmas House	Hallmark Channel	
2021 (32nd)	The Christmas Setup	Lifetime	
2021 (32nd)	Dashing in December	Paramount Network	
2021 (32nd)	La Leyenda Negra	HBO Latino/HBO Max	
2021 (32nd)	The Thing About Harry	Freeform	
2021 (32nd)	Unpregnant	HBO Max	
2021 (32nd)	Your Name Engraved Herein	Netflix	
2022 (33rd)	TV Movie		
2022 (33rd)	Single All the Way ‡	Netflix	
2022 (33rd)	The Christmas House 2: Deck Those Halls	Hallmark Channel	
2022 (33rd)	The Fear Street Trilogy	Netflix	
2022 (33rd)	Nash Bridges	USA Network	
2022 (33rd)	Under the Christmas Tree	Lifetime	
2022 (33rd)	Limited or Anthology Series		
2022 (33rd)	It's a Sin ‡	HBO Max	
2022 (33rd)	Dopesick	Hulu	
2022 (33rd)	Halston	Netflix	
2022 (33rd)	Little Birds	Starz	
2022 (33rd)	Love Life	HBO Max	
2022 (33rd)	Master of None Presents: Moments in Love	Netflix	
2022 (33rd)	Rūrangi	Hulu	
2022 (33rd)	Station Eleven	HBO Max	
2022 (33rd)	Vigil	Peacock	
2022 (33rd)	The White Lotus	HBO	
2023 (34th)	The White Lotus ‡	HBO	
2023 (34th)	American Horror Story: NYC	FX	
2023 (34th)	The Ignorant Angels	Hulu	
2023 (34th)	The Best Man: The Final Chapters	Peacock	
2023 (34th)	Welcome to Chippendales	Hulu	
2024 (35th)	Fellow Travelers ‡	Showtime	
2024 (35th)	Black Cake	Hulu	
2024 (35th)	Bodies	Netflix	
2024 (35th)	The Confessions of Frannie Langton	BritBox	
2024 (35th)	The Fall of the House of Usher	Netflix	
2024 (35th)	The Full Monty	FX on Hulu	
2024 (35th)	The Lost Flowers of Alice Hart	Amazon Prime Video	
2024 (35th)	Queen Charlotte: A Bridgerton Story	Netflix	
2024 (35th)	Scott Pilgrim Takes Off	Netflix	
2024 (35th)	Transatlantic	Netflix	
2025 (36th)	Baby Reindeer ‡	Netflix	
2025 (36th)	Becoming Karl Lagerfeld	Disney+	
2025 (36th)	Carol & The End of the World	Netflix	
2025 (36th)	Eric	Netflix	
2025 (36th)	Expats	Amazon Prime Video	
2025 (36th)	Feud: Capote vs The Swans	FX	
2025 (36th)	Get Millie Black	Max	
2025 (36th)	Mary & George	Starz	
2025 (36th)	The New Look	Apple TV+	
2025 (36th)	Under the Bridge	Hulu	
2026 (37th)	The Beast in Me (TV series)	Netflix	
2026 (37th)	Chief of War	Apple TV+	
2026 (37th)	Devil in Disguise: John Wayne Gacy	Peacock	
2026 (37th)	Hal & Harper	Mubi	
2026 (37th)	“Hotel Reverie” Black Mirror	Amazon Prime Video	
2026 (37th)	Lost Boys and Fairies	BritBox	
2026 (37th)	Mr Loverman	BritBox	
2026 (37th)	Nine Perfect Strangers	Hulu	
2026 (37th)	Prime Target	Apple TV+	
2026 (37th)	Wayward	Netflix	
