= 32nd GLAAD Media Awards =

Glaad Media Awards

- Date: April 8, 2021
- Hosted by: Niecy Nash

The 32nd GLAAD Media Awards is the 2021 annual presentation of the GLAAD Media Awards, presented by GLAAD honoring the 2020 media season. It was held on April 8, 2021. The awards honor films, television shows, video games, musicians and works of journalism that fairly, accurately and inclusively represent the LGBT community and issues relevant to the community. GLAAD announced the 198 nominees split across 28 categories on January 28, 2021 on TikTok. A new category was created for Children's Programming, honoring televised works aired for younger children. The winners were announced in a virtual ceremony hosted by Niecy Nash. The show featured performances from Chika, Rebecca Black and Nash's wife Jessica Betts.

== Winners and nominees ==
The nominees were announced by Josie Totah, Shangela, and Jonathan Bennett on GLAAD's TikTok page on January 28, 2021. The winners were announced in a virtual ceremony on April 8, 2021, hosted by Niecy Nash.

Winners are listed first, highlighted in boldface, and indicated with a double dagger (‡).

=== Film ===
| **Outstanding Film – Wide Release**: **Happiest Season (Hulu)**‡; The Craft: Legacy (Sony Pictures); Ma Rainey's Black Bottom (Netflix); The Old Guard (Netflix); The Prom (Netflix) | **Outstanding Film – Limited Release**: **The Boys in the Band (Netflix)**‡; Ammonite (Neon); And Then We Danced (Music Box Films); The Half of It (Netflix); I Carry You with Me (Sony Pictures Classics); Kajillionaire (Focus Features); The Life Ahead (Netflix); Lingua Franca (ARRAY); Monsoon (Strand Releasing); The True Adventures of Wolfboy (Vertical Entertainment) |

=== Television ===
| **Outstanding Comedy Series**: **Schitt's Creek (Pop)**‡; Big Mouth (Netflix); Dead to Me (Netflix); Everything's Gonna Be Okay (Freeform); Harley Quinn (HBO Max); Love, Victor (Hulu); Saved by the Bell (Peacock); Sex Education (Netflix); Superstore (NBC); Twenties (BET) | **Outstanding Drama Series**: **Star Trek: Discovery (CBS All Access)**‡; 9-1-1: Lone Star (Fox); Killing Eve (BBC America); P-Valley (Starz); Ratched (Netflix); Supergirl (The CW); The Umbrella Academy (Netflix); Vida (Starz); The Wilds (Amazon); Wynonna Earp (Syfy) |
| **Outstanding TV Movie**: **Uncle Frank (Amazon Studios)**‡; Alice Júnior (Netflix); Bad Education (HBO); The Christmas House (Hallmark Channel); The Christmas Setup (Lifetime); Dashing in December (Paramount Network); La Leyenda Negra (HBO Latino/HBO Max); The Thing About Harry (Freeform); Unpregnant (HBO Max); Your Name Engraved Herein (Netflix) | **Outstanding Limited or Anthology Series**: **I May Destroy You (HBO)**‡; Dispatches from Elsewhere (AMC); The Haunting of Bly Manor (Netflix); Hollywood (Netflix); Little Fires Everywhere (Hulu) |
| **Outstanding Documentary**: **Disclosure (Netflix)**‡; Circus of Books (Netflix); Equal (HBO Max); For They Know Not What They Do (First Run Features); Howard (Disney+); Mucho Mucho Amor: The Legend of Walter Mercado (Netflix); Scream, Queen! My Nightmare on Elm Street (Virgil Films/Shudder); Visible: Out on Television (Apple TV+); We Are the Radical Monarchs (POV/PBS); Welcome to Chechnya (HBO) | **Outstanding Reality Program**: **We're Here (HBO)**‡; Deaf U (Netflix); Legendary (HBO Max); Queer Eye (Netflix); RuPaul's Drag Race (VH1) |
| **Outstanding Variety or Talk Show Episode**: **"Lilly Responds to Comments About Her Sexuality" – A Little Late with Lilly Singh (NBC)**‡; "Andy Cohen Calls for Change So He Can Donate His Plasma" – Watch What Happens Live with Andy Cohen (Bravo); "Black Trans Lives Matter" – Full Frontal with Samantha Bee (TBS); "Emily's Coming Out Story" – Red Table Talk: The Estefans (Facebook Watch); "Laverne Cox – Exploring Trans Representation with 'Disclosure'" – The Daily Show with Trevor Noah (Comedy Central) | **Outstanding Scripted Television Series (Spanish-Language)**: **Veneno (HBO Max)**‡; Ana (Amazon/Comedy Central/Pantaya); Élite (Netflix); #Luimelia (Atresplayer Premium); Someone Has to Die (Netflix) |
| **Outstanding Children's Programming**: **The Not-Too-Late Show with Elmo (HBO Max)**‡; "Challenge of the Senior Junior Woodchucks!" – DuckTales (Disney XD); "Dogbot" – Clifford the Big Red Dog (PBS); "Nancy Plays Dress Up" – Fancy Nancy (Disney Junior); Summer Camp Island (HBO Max) | **Outstanding Kids & Family Programming**: **First Day (Hulu)**‡; **She-Ra and the Princesses of Power (DreamWorks Animation/Netflix)**‡; Craig of the Creek (Cartoon Network); Diary of a Future President (Disney+); Kipo and the Age of Wonderbeasts (DreamWorks Animation/Netflix); The Loud House (Nickelodeon); "Mary Anne Saves the Day" – The Baby-Sitters Club (Netflix); "Obsidian" – Adventure Time: Distant Lands (HBO Max); The Owl House (Disney Channel); Steven Universe (Cartoon Network) (Note: Aired as Steven Universe Future) |

=== Journalism ===
| Award | Nominees |
|---|---|
| Outstanding TV Journalism Segment | **"Dwyane Wade One-On-One: Basketball Legend Opens Up About Supporting Transgender Daughter" – Good Morning America (ABC)**‡; "Black Trans Activists on Being the 'Blueprint for the Struggle for Black Freedom'" – MSNBC Live with Hallie Jackson (MSNBC); "Faith, Foster Care and LGBTQ Rights Collide in Supreme Court" – ABC News Prime (ABC News Live); "One-on-One with Transportation Secretary Nominee Pete Buttigieg" – State of the Union (CNN); "Trans and Non-Binary People Face Voting Barriers Ahead of 2020 Election" (CBSN) |
| Outstanding TV Journalism – Long-Form | **"ABC News Joe Biden Town Hall" (ABC)**‡; "The Deciders" (CBS); "Pride and Protest: Being Black and Queer in America in 2020" (NBC News Now); "Pride on ABC News Live: The Landmark Decision" (ABC News Live); "Prideland" (PBS) |
| Outstanding Print Article | **"20 LGBTQ+ People Working to Save Lives on the Frontline" by Diane Anderson-Minshall, David Artavia, Tracy Gilchrist, Desiree Guerrero, Jeffrey Masters, Donald Padgett, and Daniel Reynolds (The Advocate)**‡; "The AIDS Quilt Marches Home" by Jason Sheeler (People); "As Homeless Shelters Brace for Funding Cuts, LGBTQ Youths Take Desperate Measures to Get By" by Samantha Schmidt (The Washington Post); "Delaware's Sarah McBride Makes History as the Nation's First Openly Transgender State Senator" by Meg Ryan (Delaware Today); "How a March for Black Trans Lives Became a Huge Event" by Anushka Patil (The New York Times); "It's Time for a New Tipping Point for Transgender Folks in Hollywood" by Tre'vell Anderson (Out); "LGBTQ Americans Are Getting Coronavirus, Losing Jobs. Anti-Gay Bias is Making it Worse for Them." by Petruce Jean-Charles (USA Today); "Lutheran High School Athletic Trainer, Coach Says She Was Fired for Being Gay" by Arika Herron (The Indianapolis Star); "States Won't Collect LGBTQ Data on COVID-19 — and Advocates Aren't Happy" by Chris Johnson (Washington Blade); "Why Billy Porter is a National Treasure" by Tre'vell Anderson (Essence) |
| Outstanding Magazine Overall Coverage | **People**‡; The Advocate; Billboard; Plus; Variety |
| Outstanding Online Journalism Article | **"Gay Men Speak Out After Being Turned Away from Donating Blood During Coronavirus Pandemic: 'We are Turning Away Perfectly Healthy Donors'" by Tony Morrison and Joel Lyons (GoodMorningAmerica.com)**‡; "The Battle Over Title IX and Who Gets to be a Woman in Sports: Inside the Raging National Debate" by Katie Barnes (espnW.com); "Here's how Reggie Greer Takes on LGBTQ Outreach for Joe Biden in this 'Very Personal' Election" by John Gallagher (LGBTQNation.com); "No Medicine, No Food: Coronavirus Restrictions Amplify Health Risks to LGBT+ People with HIV" by Nita Bhalla and Oscar Lopez (Openlynews.com); "An Oral History of Fashion's Response to the AIDS Epidemic" (series) by Phillip Picardi (VOGUE.com); "Queer Spaces Project' (series) by Nico Lang, Samantha Allen, Marke B., Matt Baume, Steven Blum, Alexander Cheves, Devlyn Camp, Michael Cuby, James Factora, KC Hoard, Sophie Hurwitz, Michelle Kim, and Daniel Villareal (them.us); "Trans Athletes' Fight for Inclusion in World Rugby" (series) by Dawn Ennis, Alex Reimer, Karleigh Webb, and Cyd Zeigler (Outsports.com); "Trans Freedom Fighters" (series) by Sam Levin (TheGuardian.com); "Trans, Imprisoned — and Trapped" by Kate Sosin (NBCNews.com); "'You Don't Belong Here': In Poland's 'LGBT-Free Zones' Existing is an Act of Defiance" by Ivana Kottasová and Rob Picheta (CNN.com) |
| Outstanding Online Journalism – Video or Multimedia | **"Stop Killing Us: Black Transgender Women's Lived Experiences" by Talibah Newman Ometu, Thomas Blount, Juliana Schatz Preston, and Mariah Dupont (Complex World)**‡; "A Closer Look: Transgender in Kashmir" by Robert Leslie, Bhat Burhan & Saqib Mugloo (Business Insider); "I'm an Immigrant Fighting for Queer Rights and Racial Justice" by Abigail E. Disney, Catherine King, Maria Nunez, Sharmeen Obaid-Chinoy, Patty Quillin, Julie Parker Benello, Susan Sherrerd, and Lynda Weinman (Refinery29); "They Will See You: LGBTQ+ Visibility in Advertising" by Brent Miller, Otto Bell, and Jordan Shavarebi (Great Big Story); "Why LGBTQ Rights Hinge on the Definition of 'Sex'" by Laura Bult, Ranjani Chakraborty, Melissa Hirsch, and Sidnee King (Vox) |
| Outstanding Spanish-Language TV Journalism | **"La Hermana de Aleyda Ortiz Narra Cómo Salió del Clóset y Cómo se lo Comunicó a su Familia" – Despierta América (Univision)**‡; "Decisión de la Corte Suprema Para Comunidad LGBTQ" – Un Nuevo Día (Telemundo); "Proyecto ser Humano: La Terapia del Engaño" – Camilo (CNN en Español); "Refugio para Pacientes de COVID-19 y Comunidad LGBTI en México" – Un Nuevo Día (Telemundo); "Sanación Milagrosa" – Despierta América (Univision) |
| Outstanding Spanish-Language Online Journalism Article | **"Desapareció en México, Solo se Hallaron sus Restos: La Historia de la Doctora María Elizabeth Montaño y su Importancia para la Comunidad Trans" by Albinson Linares and Marina E. Franco (Telemundo.com)**‡; "El Brutal Asesinato de una Mujer Transgénero Conmociona a Puerto Rico y Renueva una Conversación Sobre la Transfobia" by Harmeet Kaur and Rafy Rivera (CNNEspañol.com); "Entrevistas para el mes del Orgullo LGBT+" by Paula Velasco, Aurora Villaseñor, and Sofía Viramontes (Gatopardo.com); "Elliot Page y el Dilema Social del Género" by Marcos Billy Guzmán (ElNuevoDía.com); "La Historia de un Amor Moderno" by María Torres Clausell (Quién.com) |
| Outstanding Spanish-Language Online Journalism – Video or Multimedia | **"Soy Trans: El Camino a un Nuevo Despertar" by Sarah Moreno, Esther Piccolino, and José Sepúlveda (El Nuevo Herald)**‡; "Abril Zamora: Sin Filtros" (Elle España); "Ciudad de México Prohibe las 'Terapias' Contra la Homosexualidad" by Elías Camhaji, Jonás Cortés, and Rodrigo Floriano (El País); "La Liga Deportiva de la Diversidad" by Lucía Anaya (Vice en Español); "Mujeres LGBT+ en México: Ari Vera" (Homosensual) |

=== Other ===
| Award | Nominees |
|---|---|
| Outstanding Blog | **TransGriot**‡; Gays with Kids; JoeMyGod; Pittsburgh Lesbian Correspondents; The Reckoning |
| Outstanding Comic Book | **Empyre, Lords of Empyre: Emperor Hulkling, Empyre: Aftermath Avengers, written by Al Ewing, Dan Slott, Chip Zdarsky, Anthony Oliveira (Marvel Comics)**‡; Far Sector, written by N. K. Jemisin (DC Comics); Guardians of the Galaxy, written by Al Ewing (Marvel Comics); Juliet Takes a Breath, written by Gabby Rivera (BOOM! Studios); Lois Lane, written by Greg Rucka (DC Comics); The Magic Fish, written by Trung Le Nguyen (Random House Graphic); Suicide Squad, written by Tom Taylor (DC Comics); Wynd, written by James Tynion IV (BOOM! Studios); X-Factor, written by Leah Williams (Marvel Comics); You Brought Me the Ocean, written by Alex Sanchez (DC Comics) |
| Outstanding Music Artist | **Sam Smith – Love Goes (Capitol)**‡; Adam Lambert – Velvet (More Is More/Empire); Brandy Clark – Your Life Is a Record (Warner Records); Halsey – Manic (Capitol); Kehlani – It Was Good Until It Wasn't (Atlantic); Lady Gaga – Chromatica (Streamline/Interscope); Miley Cyrus – Plastic Hearts (RCA); Pabllo Vittar – 111 (BMT/Sony Music Brasil); Peppermint – A Girl Like Me: Letters to My Lovers (Producer Entertainment Group); Ricky Martin – Pausa (Sony Latin) |
| Outstanding Breakthrough Music Artist | **Chika – Industry Games (Warner Records)**‡; Arca – KiCk i (XL); FLETCHER – The (S)ex Tapes (Capitol); Keiynan Lonsdale – Rainbow Boy (Keiynan Lonsdale); Kidd Kenn – Child's Play (Island Records); Orville Peck – Show Pony (Columbia/Sub Pop); Phoebe Bridgers – Punisher (Dead Oceans); Rina Sawayama – Sawayama (Dirty Hit/Avex Trax); Trixie Mattel – Barbara (Producer Entertainment Group/ATO Records); Victoria Monét – Jaguar (Tribe Records) |
| Outstanding Video Game | **The Last of Us Part II (Sony Interactive Entertainment)**‡; **Tell Me Why (Xbox Game Studios)**‡; Assassin's Creed Valhalla (Ubisoft); Borderlands 3: Guns, Love, and Tentacles (2K Games); Bugsnax (Young Horses); Hades (Supergiant Games); If Found... (Annapurna Interactive); Ikenfell (Humble Games); Immortals Fenyx Rising (Ubisoft); World of Warcraft: Shadowlands (Blizzard Entertainment) |

=== Special Recognition ===
- After Forever (Amazon)
- New Hollywood (Deadline)
- Happiest Season Soundtrack (Facet/Warner Records)
- Noah's Arc: The 'Rona Chronicles (Patrik Ian-Polk Entertainment)
- Out (Pixar/Disney+)
- Razor Tongue (YouTube)
- "The Son" – Little America (Apple TV+)
