= 37th GLAAD Media Awards =

LGBT award show

- Date: March 5, 2026
- Location: Los Angeles, California
- Country: United States
- Hosted by: Jonathan Bennett

Television/radio coverage
- Network: Hulu

The 37th GLAAD Media Awards is the 2026 annual presentation of the GLAAD Media Awards by GLAAD honoring 2025 films, television shows, video games, musicians and works of journalism that fairly, accurately and inclusively represent the LGBT community and issues relevant to the community. The show was hosted by American actor Jonathan Bennett and broadcast on Hulu for the sixth consecutive year. Demi Lovato was set to perform at the ceremony.

== Winners and nominees ==
The eligibility period for the 37th GLAAD Media Awards ran from January 1, 2025, to December 31, 2025. Nominees were announced on January 7, 2026.

Winners are listed first and highlighted in bold.

=== Film ===
**Outstanding Film – Wide Release**: **Kiss of the Spider Woman (Lionsgate Films/Roadside Attractions/LD Entertainment)**; Blue Moon (Sony Pictures Classics); Christy (Black Bear Pictures); Clown in a Cornfield (RLJE Films/Shudder); Downton Abbey: The Grand Finale (Focus Features); The History of Sound (Mubi); I Know What You Did Last Summer (Sony Pictures Releasing); On Swift Horses (Sony Pictures Classics); Twinless (Roadside Attractions); The Wedding Banquet (Bleecker Street)	**Outstanding Film – Limited Release**: **A Nice Indian Boy (Blue Harbor Entertainment) (TIE)**; **Plainclothes (Magnolia Pictures) (TIE)**; Cactus Pears (Strand Releasing); Fairyland (Lionsgate Films/Willa); Griffin in Summer (Vertical); I Wish You All the Best (Lionsgate Films); Ponyboi (Fox Entertainment); The Queen of My Dreams (Product of Culture/Willa); Sorry, Baby (A24); Young Hearts (Strand Releasing)	**Outstanding Film – Streaming or TV**: **Queen of Coal (Netflix)**; 10Dance (Netflix); The Christmas Baby (Hallmark Channel); Echo Valley (Apple TV); Hedda (Amazon MGM Studios); A Keller Christmas Vacation (Hallmark Channel); Noah's Arc: The Movie (Paramount+); Oh. What. Fun. (Prime Video); The Old Guard 2 (Netflix); The Parenting (HBO Max)

=== Television ===
**Outstanding New Series**: **Heated Rivalry (Crave/HBO Max)**; Boots (Netflix); Chad Powers (Hulu); Clean Slate (Prime Video); The Four Seasons (Netflix); The Hunting Wives (Netflix); I Love LA (HBO); Long Story Short (Netflix); Mid-Century Modern (Hulu); Overcompensating (Prime Video); Pluribus (Apple TV)	**Outstanding Limited or Anthology Series**: **Wayward (Netflix)**; The Beast in Me (Netflix); Chief of War (Apple TV); Devil in Disguise: John Wayne Gacy (Peacock); Hal & Harper (Mubi); Hotel Reverie, Black Mirror (Netflix); Lost Boys and Fairies (Britbox); Mr Loverman (Britbox); Nine Perfect Strangers (Prime Video); Prime Target (Apple TV)
**Outstanding Comedy Series**: **Palm Royale (Apple TV)**; Abbott Elementary (ABC); Big Boys (Hulu); Ghosts (CBS); Hacks (HBO); Hazbin Hotel (Prime Video); Loot (Apple TV); The Righteous Gemstones (HBO); Survival of the Thickest (Netflix); The Upshaws (Netflix)	**Outstanding Drama Series**: **Stranger Things (Netflix)**; Brilliant Minds (NBC); The Buccaneers (Apple TV); Doctor Who (Disney+); The Gilded Age (HBO); The Last of Us (HBO); Power Book III: Raising Kanan (Starz); The Sandman (Netflix); Severance (Apple TV); Yellowjackets (Showtime)
**Outstanding Reality Program**: **Southern Hospitality (Bravo)**; Back to the Frontier (Magnolia Network); House on Fire (BET+); Jay & Pamela (TLC); June Farms (Prime Video); Love on the Spectrum (Netflix); Next Gen NYC (Bravo); Selling Sunset (Netflix); Southern Charm (Bravo); The Ultimatum: Queer Love (Netflix)	**Outstanding Reality Competition Program**: **The Traitors (Peacock)**; American Ninja Warrior (NBC); The Boulet Brothers' Dragula: Titans (AMC+/Shudder); Dancing with the Stars (ABC); Finding Mr. Christmas (Hallmark Channel); I Kissed a Boy (Hulu); I Kissed a Girl (Hulu); Project Runway (Freeform); RuPaul's Drag Race (MTV); The Voice (NBC)
**Outstanding Documentary**: **Come See Me in the Good Light (Apple TV)**; Amy Bradley Is Missing (Netflix); Enigma (HBO); Heightened Scrutiny (Fourth Act Film); I'm Your Venus (Netflix); In Transit (Prime Video); Love & Rage: Munroe Bergdorf (Peacock); "A Mother Apart" POV (PBS); Pee-Wee as Himself (HBO); Sally (National Geographic)	**Outstanding Variety or Talk Show Episode**: **"Guest Host Alan Cumming on Attacks Against the Trans Community & Bringing Kindness Back in America", Jimmy Kimmel Live (ABC)**; "Greg Mathis Jr. Opens Up About Living As His Authentic Self", Tamron Hall (Syndicated); "JHud Surprises Black Gay Weddings Founders with Special Anniversary Gift", The Jennifer Hudson Show (Syndicated); "Kelly Clarkson Celebrates Trans Day of Visibility With 'TRANSA' Creator Massima Bell", The Kelly Clarkson Show (Syndicated); Las Culturistas Culture Awards (Bravo/Peacock); "Laverne Cox and George Wallace Star In Norman Lear's Final Show, 'Clean Slate'" The View (ABC); "Max Salvador and Victoria SanJuan", Watch What Happens Live with Andy Cohen (Bravo); "New York Pride Week and Corporate Sponsors Pull Back by Trump", The Late Show with Stephen Colbert (CBS); "Trans Athletes", Last Week Tonight with John Oliver (HBO); "Transgender Soldiers Explain Why Trump's Military Ban is Bogus", The Daily Show (Comedy Central)

=== Children's and Youth Programming ===
**Outstanding Children's Programming**: **Firebuds (Disney Jr.)**; Bearbrick (Apple TV); "Ghost Town", Mermicorno: Starfall (HBO Max); "No Wrong Way to Be You", Sesame Street (HBO Max); Star Wars: Young Jedi Adventures (Disney Jr./Disney+)	**Outstanding Kids and Family Programming - Live Action**: **XO, Kitty (Netflix)**; Goosebumps: The Vanishing (Disney+/Hulu); Jane (Apple TV); School Spirits (Paramount+); "Selamiut", Washington Black (Hulu)	**Outstanding Kids and Family Programming - Animated**: **Adventure Time: Fionna and Cake (HBO Max)**; The Bravest Knight; Jurassic World: Chaos Theory (Netflix); Moon Girl and Devil Dinosaur (Disney Channel); The Proud Family: Louder and Prouder (Disney+)

=== Other ===
**Outstanding Broadway Production**: **Liberation**; Oedipus; Purpose; Redwood; Smash	**Outstanding Video Game**: **Lost Records: Bloom & Rage (Don't Nod)**; Ambrosia Sky: Act One (Soft Rains); Assassin's Creed Shadows (Ubisoft); The August Before (Silly Little Games/Catoptric Games); Cabernet (Party for Introverts/Akupara Games); The Great Villainess: Strategy of Lily (One or Eight/Alliance Arts); Hades II (Supergiant Games); Old Skies (Wadjet Eye Games); Road to Empress (New One Studio); The Roottrees are Dead (Evil Trout Inc.)
**Outstanding Comic Book**: **Avengers Academy: Marvel's Voices by Anthony Oliveira, Elsa Sjunneson, Carola Borelli, Bailie Rosenlund, Pablo Collar, Charles Stewart III, Alti Firmansyah, Minkyu Jung, KJ Díaz, Ruth Redmond, Dono Sánchez-Almara, Ariana Maher, Joe Caramagna (Marvel Infinity Comics)**; Absolute Green Lantern by Al Ewing, Jahoy Lindsay, Jason Howard, Riley Rossmo, Sid Kotain, Iñaki Azpiazu, Pressy, Lucas Gattoni (DC Comics); The Department of Truth by James Tynion IV, Martin Simmonds, Letizia Cadonici, Aditya Bidikar, Jordie Bellaire, Dylan Todd (Image Comics); Exceptional X-Men by Eve Ewing, Carmen Carnero, Federica Mancin, Nolan Woodard, Travis Lanham (Marvel Comics); Minor Arcana by Jeff Lemire, Patricio Delpeche, Letizia Cadonici, Steve Wands (Boom! Studios); The Oddly Pedestrian Life of Christopher Chaos: Children of the Night Tate Brombal based on an idea by James Tynion IV, Isaac Goodhart, Priscilla Petraites, Miquel Muerto, Aditya Bidikar (Dark Horse Comics); Poison Ivy by G. Willow Wilson, Marcio Takara, Brian Level, Atagun Ilhan, Mark Buckingham, Arif Prianto, Lee Loughridge, Hassan Otsmane-Elhaou, Tom Napolitano (DC Comics); Runaways by Rainbow Rowell, Elena Casagrande, Roberta Ingranata, Lee Ferguson, Dee Cunniffe, Travis Lanham (Marvel Comics); Secret Six by Nicole Maines, Stephen Segovia, Cian Tormey, Roger Cruz, Rain Beredo, Steve Wands (DC Comics); Wynd: The Power of the Blood by James Tynion IV, Michael Dialynas, Andworld Design, Nancy Mojica, Madison Goyette (Boom! Studios)	**Outstanding Graphic Novel/Anthology**: **Gaysians, by Mike Curato (Algonquin Books)**; Cannon by Lee Lai (Drawn & Quarterly); Dan in Green Gables by Rey Terciero, Claudia Aguirre (Penguin Workshop); First Kiss with Fangs, by Marker Snyder (Holiday House); Hey, Mary!, by Andrew Wheeler, Rye Hickman, Hank Jones, Frank Cvetkovic (Oni Press); It Rhymes with Takei, by George Takei, Harmony Becker, Steven Scott, and Justin Eisinger (Top Shelf Productions); Low Orbit, by Kazimir Lee (Top Shelf Productions); A Song for You and I, by K. O'Neill (Random House Graphic); Spent, by Alison Bechdel, Holly Rae Taylor, Jon Chad (Mariner Books); Trans History: From Ancient Times to the Present Day, by Alex L. Combs, Andrew Eakett, Tif Bucknor (Candlewick Press)
**Outstanding Music Artist**: **Young Miko, Do Not Disturb**; Conan Gray, Wishbone; Durand Bernarr, Bloom; Elton John & Brandi Carlile, Who Believes in Angels?; Ethel Cain, Willoughby Tucker, I'll Always Love You; G Flip, Dream Ride; Lady Gaga, Mayhem; Maren Morris, Dreamsicle; Reneé Rapp, Bite Me; Ty Herndon, Thirty Vol.1	**Outstanding Breakthrough Music Artist**: **Katseye**; Amaarae; Chris Housman; Destin Conrad; Eli; Frankie Grande; Guitarricadelafuente; Shygirl; Snow Wife; Wet Leg
**Outstanding Podcast**: **Handsome Podcast (Headgum)**; The Bald and the Beautiful (Studio 71); Las Culturistas (IHeartMedia); The Daily Beans Podcast (MSW Media); Outlaws with TS Madison (IHeartMedia); The Read (Loud Speakers Network); Shut Up Evan (Acast); So True with Caleb Hearon (Wave); Tactful Pettiness (PodcastOne); We Can Do Hard Things (Audacy)	**Outstanding Podcast Episode**: **"Chappell Roan: Are People Scared of Me?", Call Her Daddy (The Unwell Network/SiriusXM) (TIE)**; **"Straight Panic, Gay Excellence", I've Had It (PodcastOne) (TIE)**; "All-American Grift: We Investigated Trump's Favorite Sports Troll", Pablo Torre Finds Out (Meadowlark Media); "Carl Nassib", The Pivot Podcast (Shots Studio); "Dispatches From the Living Memory of Trans People of Color", Code Switch (NPR); "SERIAL KILLER: The Doodler", Crime Junkie (Audiochuck); "Niecy Nash-Betts Opens Up About the Love That Changed Everything", House Guest (Scott Evans/Spotify); "The Paper Doll: Dylan Mulvaney", Between Us with Heather and Terry Dubrow (IHeartMedia); "Rachel Maddow: Trump's Alaska Summit With Putin Is an 'Abject Humiliation'", Pivot with Kara Swisher and Scott Galloway (New York Magazine/Vox Media); "Reneé Rapp", Good Hang with Amy Poehler (The Ringer/Spotify)
**Outstanding Magazine Overall Coverage**: **People**; The Advocate; Cosmopolitan; Gaye Magazine; The Hollywood Reporter; Out; POZ; Rolling Stone; Time; Variety

=== Journalism ===
**Outstanding TV Journalism – Long-Form**: **A Transgender Marine Speaks Out (NBC 7 San Diego)**; Heart of Pride (CBS 3 Philadelphia); HIV Unwrapped (Hulu/ABC Localish); Late to the Party: Coming Out Later in Life (ABC); Living in Pryde (GBH Boston); Living Proof (Hulu); Pride 2025 – Rise Up: Pride in Protest. (ABC 7 New York); Pride Edition 2025 | Storytellers (LATV); Shaye & Amanda Scott (NBC 5 Chicago); Still Marching: A NY1 Pride Month Special (Spectrum News NY1)	**Outstanding Online or Print Journalism Article**: **"As the first out trans person in Congress, Sarah McBride is ready to fight for us" by Christopher Wiggins (The Advocate)**; "Detransition is rare, but it's driving anti-trans policy anyway" by Orion Rummler (19thNews.org); "He fled Iraq after he was jailed for being gay. Now Donald Trump is making his life hell." by Daniel Villareal (LGBTQNation.com); "I Spent Eight Years in Conversion Therapy Mistaking Shame for Faith" by TImothy Schraeder Rodriguez (Time); "King of Olympus" by Robert W. Fieseler (64 Parishes); "Queer in present danger: Richmond's LGBTQ+ community finding safe spaces in difficult times" by Justin Lo (Richmond Times-Dispatch); "The Rainbows They Tried to Erase" by David Clarke (OutSmart); "Tramell Tillman on His Emotional Coming Out Story, 'Severance' Delays and Acting With Tom Cruise the Day After He Got 'Mission: Impossible' Script" by Clayton Davis (Variety); "Trans people didn't ask to get pulled into any of this" by Mel Woods (Xtra); "Vivian Jenna Wilson on Being Elon Musk's Estranged Daughter, Protecting Trans Youth and Taking on the Right Online" by Ella Yurman (Teen Vogue)

=== Spanish ===
**Outstanding Scripted Television Series**: **Mariliendre (Atresplayer)**; El fin del amor (Prime Video); Mujeres con Hombreras (Adult Swim/HBO Max); Olympo (Netflix); Serpientes y escaleras (Netflix)	**Outstanding TV Journalism**: **Ni hombre, ni mujer: Intersexual by Noticias Telemundo (Telemundo)**; **Orgullo 2025 Avances, Desafíos y Caminos by Spectrum News (Spectrum)**; Brasil: iglesias promueven la detransición de género by En Foco (France 24 Español); De maquillar reinas de belleza a preso en El Salvador by Noticias Telemundo (Telemundo); La historia del Stonewall Inn y la importancia de Nueva York para la comunidad LGBTQ+ by Noticiero Univision 41 (Univision); Ola arcoíris recorre América: ¿en qué punto están los derechos LGBTIQ+ en el continente? by Ellas Hoy (France 24 Español); El Orgullo, colores de libertad. (CNN en Español); Raúl González revela por qué calló sobre su orientación sexual by ¡Despierta América! (N+ Univision); Spirit Day una fecha para combatir el bullying a la comunidad LGBTQ+ by Hoy Día (Telemundo); Wendy Guevara, la sexta desigual by Desiguales (Spectrum News NY1) (N+ Univision)
**Outstanding Online Journalism Article**: **My Coming Out Story by Quién [serie] (Quien.com)**; 10 íconos LGBT+ que marcaron la historia de México by Yet Akatzin Almazán (Homosensual.com); Las cosas positivas de la masculinidad que descubrí al transicionar como hombre trans by Ronald Alexander Ávila-Claudio (BBC.com); Cuando la rebeldía perdura: envejecer siendo LGBTIQ+ by Mariana Escobar Bernoske (ElEspectador.com); El largo camino de las familias diversas para adoptar en México: 'Lo que se busca es que los niños tengan un hogar by Paola Alín (ElPaís.com); El Orgullo, colores de libertad. (CNN en Español); Latinas trans denuncian que administración Trump 'envalentona' más ataques y discriminación en NYC by Edwin Martínez (ElDiarioNY.com); La Niñez Trans Existe by David Cordero-Mercado (ElNuevoDia.com); La realidad de muchos jóvenes de la comunidad LGBTQ en México: poca aceptación familiar e ideas de suicidio by Karen Esquivel (CNN.com); Que Nadie Te Diga Que no–El cine transfeminista de Gaby Castillo by Andrea Domínguez and Andrés Camilo Gómez (sentiido.com); Un tercio de los mexicanos ha presenciado algún acto de violencia contra el colectivo LGTBIQ+ by Elena San José (El País.com)	**Outstanding Online Journalism – Video or Multimedia**: **¿Tienes HIV, Mijo? A Mother's Journey by Living y Ready (LATV)**; Amor y crianza diversa: la historia de cómo Sergio y Juan Pablo adoptaron a Amalia (El Espectador); Hemos Estado. Nuestra historia nunca se detiene (Pride Mx); Hombre o mujer, ¿y nada más? Historia sobre el género y la identidad (DW Español); El Nuevo Reggaeton Sin Censura by Dosis con Michelle Galvan (Univision)
**Outstanding Scripted Television Series**: **Before We Forget (Twenty Nine Palms Ent.)**	Special Recognition Andry Hernández Romero

== See also ==
- List of LGBT-related awards
- 3rd Rainbow Awards
