= Lost Records: Bloom & Rage =

2025 adventure game

- Developer: Don't Nod Montréal
- Publisher: Don't Nod
- Director: Michel Koch
- Producers: Luc Baghadoust; Catherine Vincelli; Valentin Rossero
- Designer: Baptiste Moisan
- Programmer: Yvan Poeymirou
- Artist: Sam Bradley
- Writers: Desiree Cifre; Nina Freeman; Jean-Luc Cano
- Composers: Milk & Bone; Ruth Radelet; Nora Kelly
- Engine: Unreal Engine 5
- Platforms: PlayStation 5; Windows; Xbox Series X/S
- Release: February 18, 2025 (Tape 1); April 15, 2025 (Tape 2)
- Genre: Adventure
- Mode: Single-player

Lost Records: Bloom & Rage is a two-part adventure game developed by Don't Nod Montréal and published by Don't Nod. The plot focuses on four teenage girls: Swann, Nora, Autumn, and Kat, who go on a journey of self-discovery and forge unbreakable bonds during the summer of 1995. Running concurrently with the main plot, the girls reunite 27 years later, where they confront the long-buried secret that made them promise to never speak again.

Bloom & Rage was released for PlayStation 5, Windows, and Xbox Series X/S in two parts. The first part was released on February 18, 2025, and the second on April 15. The game received generally positive reviews upon release.

== Gameplay ==
Players make narrative decisions throughout the game as "part of recreating the story with choice and consequences" according to creative director Michel Koch. Unlike many other narrative-based games with an ensemble of main characters, Bloom & Rage has one playable character, Swann. Koch said the decision was made because having perspectives change between characters can cause a disconnect for players "from what's happening on the screen."

A major gameplay mechanic of Bloom & Rage is the use of Swann's camcorder. As Swann, the player has the freedom to record different subjects in each environment and edit them into her "memoir".

== Plot ==
=== Tape 1: Bloom ===
In November 2022, 43-year-old Swann Holloway (Olivia Lepore) travels from Vancouver back to her hometown of Velvet Cove, Michigan, to reunite with a group of friends whom she has not seen for 27 years. After arriving at the Blue Spruce bar, she converses with the friendly bartender Gus (Alex Bisping) before reuniting with Autumn Lockhart (Andrea Carter), who is now a social worker based in Atlanta and divorced with a son. Autumn explains that she contacted Swann after receiving a mysterious package addressed to "Bloom & Rage", a punk band they created in the summer of 1995. Together, they begin reminiscing about how they first met and the events that led to their mutual agreement to part ways and never speak again.

In July 1995, Swann is a 16-year-old aspiring filmmaker in the process of creating a memoir about Velvet Cove using her camcorder before she and her parents move to Vancouver. She visits a local video rental store and meets Autumn and her best friend, Nora Malakian (Amelia Sargisson), for the first time. While filming outside the store, Swann is harassed by Dylan Mikaelsen (Victoria Diamond) and her boyfriend Corey Litchfield (Jordan Dawson) until Dylan's younger sister, Kathryn "Kat" Mikaelsen (Natalie Liconti), arrives and defends Swann alongside Nora and Autumn. Angered by their interference, Corey steals Autumn's keys and tosses them away. The four girls spend the evening working together to recover the keys, and quickly bond after discovering they have much in common.

Two days later, Nora and Autumn invite Swann and Kat to watch them practice playing their guitars for their amateur punk band. Swann suggests they film a music video while Kat starts writing an original song and names the band Bloom & Rage. The girls later hike along a forest trail to film scenes for their music video. After watching the sunset together at an overlook, they become lost in the dark until they stumble upon an abandoned cabin. Swann breaks into the cabin and decides to make it the band's secret hideout. The girls later return during the day to clean and decorate the cabin before spending the next two weeks bonding and enjoying their summer. Kat takes the others to a secluded forest clearing and presents them with her finished song, declaring it to be a curse on all those who have wronged them. After making a blood pact, they agree to hold a concert to debut the song.

In 2022, while Autumn is distracted by work duties on her phone, Swann talks to Gus and Pam (Leni Parker), a regular at the bar, who discuss the seemingly supernatural occurrences that have happened in the town over the years. Nora soon arrives at the bar, now a successful fashion influencer based in Los Angeles with a wife and children, and reunites with Swann and Autumn. While Autumn desires to open the mysterious package and confront their shared past, Nora instead wants to avoid it and move on. The three women struggle to remember exactly why they parted ways and recount the night they discovered the Abyss.

In 1995, the girls spend a night at the cabin and play truth or dare, but Kat later disappears while the others are asleep. Swann finds her at the forest clearing where their blood pact was made, only now a glowing Abyss is at its center. After Nora and Autumn join them, they believe that tossing something into the Abyss will grant them a wish, and they each wish to stay together. The following day, still reeling from their discovery, they collectively stand up to Corey when he attempts to take Kat back to her strict parents, making them believe their wishes worked. The girls later hold their concert outside the Blue Spruce, which angers the locals, including Dylan and Corey. When the power is suddenly cut off, ending their concert early, Kat becomes enraged, her nose bleeds heavily, and she collapses. Dylan reveals to the others that Kat is dying from leukemia before she and Corey drive her away.

=== Tape 2: Rage ===
In 2022, despite Nora and Autumn's concerns, Swann opens the package to reveal a lockbox that Kat prepared for them in 1995 to remember her by. Swann attempts to open the box's padlock, which is inscribed with four symbols, but it remains firmly locked, and a frustrated Nora heads outside to calm her nerves. After potentially helping Gus and Pam realize their mutual attraction for each other, Swann comforts Nora and tries to convince her to stay. If Swann's relationship with Nora and Autumn is high enough, one or both of them will agree to stay with her; otherwise, they will leave the bar early to avoid finding out what is inside the lockbox.

In August 1995, Kat is admitted to the hospital while Swann, Nora, and Autumn are punished for holding the concert. Swann is forced to clean up the aftermath of the concert outside the Blue Spruce, where she apologizes to Dylan, who confesses her doubts regarding her relationship with the increasingly antagonistic Corey and claims that Kat is no longer allowed to associate with Swann and her friends. Feeling lonely, Swann returns to the cabin, where she runs into Autumn. Swann can attempt to help Autumn calm down after she experiences a panic attack, and if successful, Autumn makes a wish at the Abyss for them to remain friends forever. Swann later meets with Nora, and they head to the Mikaelsen Ranch to break Kat out. After sneaking past Corey, Swann climbs into Kat's bedroom window to find that Kat had cut her hair short out of frustration. Before they can escape, Corey barges in and becomes violent, forcing Swann to leave both Kat and her camcorder behind. Despite their failure, Swann and Nora watch a meteor shower at the overlook, where Autumn can potentially join them.

Days before Swann is set to move away, a severely weakened Kat invites the others to meet her at the Abyss, where she claims to hear a voice guiding her from within. The girls then don masks and vandalize the Mikaelsen Ranch's gift shop as part of Kat's revenge against her overbearing family. They free the ranch's captive deer, including Kat's pet doe Gertie, but Dylan and Corey arrive, forcing the girls to flee into the woods. Corey relentlessly pursues them but is slowed down by the herd of deer. The girls reach the cabin and barricade themselves inside, where they each choose a symbol inscribed on the door's padlock before chanting the combination and dancing together, which binds it shut. Dylan and Corey soon reach the cabin, which Corey sets ablaze, while the girls flee toward the Abyss.

When Corey reaches the Abyss, he tosses Swann's camcorder inside and corners the girls. Depending on Swann's previous choices, either Corey becomes enraged or Kat becomes possessed due to their proximity to the Abyss. If Corey is enraged, Swann can choose to attack him and help Kat push him into the Abyss. Swann can also choose to protect Kat with Nora and Autumn's help, causing a supernatural force to lift Corey into the air and pull him into the Abyss. If Kat is possessed, Swann can choose to stop her from being violent towards Corey, but he will then drag Kat into the Abyss with him. Swann can also choose to do nothing, and Dylan will help Kat push Corey into the Abyss instead. The outcome of all choices results in the Abyss closing up and the girls promising to forget what happened and never speak again to avoid being incriminated for Corey's disappearance. They tearfully say goodbye to each other before sealing their pact, and if Kat is still with them, she vanishes, having offered herself to the Abyss.

In 2022, Swann, as well as Nora and Autumn if either or both of them stayed, finally recover their memories, and the padlock glows, allowing Swann to unlock it. Inside the lockbox, she finds a letter written by Kat on the last day they saw each other, along with an assortment of mementos from their time together, and missing posters of Corey and Kat. Swann also finds her old camcorder before deciding to leave the Blue Spruce. Depending on whether Swann is alone or with Nora or Autumn, she will either reminisce alone at the remains of the cabin, with Nora at her old house, or with Autumn outside the abandoned video rental store; if both Nora and Autumn stayed with Swann, they perform Kat's song together at the Blue Spruce before departing, having rekindled their friendship. All outcomes conclude with Swann watching her Bloom & Rage music video on the camcorder, followed by a final recording from Kat asking Swann to find her. Swann is then drawn to the forest clearing by Kat's voice, where she finds the Abyss open again and decides to enter it.

== Development ==
In 2020, Don't Nod created its Montréal studio and commenced production on its inaugural project, with a total of six projects in development, with multiple staff members from Life Is Strange and Life Is Strange 2. A teaser image was released in a 1990s setting of a person's bedroom. Lost Records: Bloom & Rage was announced at the 2023 Game Awards.

The studio had considered creating a studio in Montréal since 2014, but did not do so until the completion of Life Is Strange 2. Due to Square Enix's ownership of the publishing rights to the Life Is Strange franchise, they stopped working on the series and decided to work on new titles that they could self-publish. As a result, the Montréal studio was established in 2020 and commenced development and production of Bloom & Rage. Musician Nora Kelly composed song "See You in Hell" for the game.

It was decided that the game would feature adults as well as teenagers. Due to the production team being French, they hired two American writers, Desiree Cifre and Nina Freeman, for their knowledge of American culture and to ensure the characters were authentic in 2022 and 1995. Koch revealed that the game is being worked on "as the foundation for a possibly larger universe", while producer Luc Baghadoust said that there will be more games in the Lost Records label, with Bloom & Rage being the first in the series.

== Release ==
Lost Records: Bloom & Rage was released in two parts, dubbed "tapes". Tape 1 was released on February 18, 2025, and Tape 2 on April 15, for PlayStation 5, Windows, and Xbox Series X/S. It was originally planned to be released in late 2024 but was delayed to avoid competition with Life Is Strange: Double Exposure. The second part was originally set to be released a month after the first, but was delayed to April to refine the experience. Koch said the team hopes it will "give us space to let the events of the story sink in, and possibly even bring us together to theorize about what will happen next", comparing the situation to how fans did a lot of theorizing between the weekly episodes of Game of Thrones. The game was included in the PlayStation Plus Extra/Premium subscription service at launch.

== Reception ==
=== Critical response ===
Reception

Aggregate scores
Aggregator	Score
Metacritic	PS5 (Tape 1): 75/100 (Tape 2): 69/100; Win (Tape 1): 84/100 (Tape 2): 78/100; XSXS (Tape 1): 81/100 (Tape 2): 79/100
OpenCritic	72% recommend

Review scores
Publication	Score
Eurogamer	Tape 1: 4/5; Tape 2: 3/5
GamesRadar+	Tape 1: 4.5/5; Tape 2: 4.5/5
Hardcore Gamer	Tape 1: 4/5; Tape 2: 4.5/5
TechRadar	Tape 1: 4.5/5; Tape 2: 4/5
The Guardian	Tape 1: 4/5; Tape 2: 4/5

According to review aggregator website Metacritic, Lost Records: Bloom & Rage received "generally favorable" reviews from critics, with the exception of the PlayStation 5 version of Tape 2, which received "mixed or average" reviews. OpenCritic determined that 73% of critics recommended the game.

=== Sales ===
Don't Nod said in April 2025 that the financial results were "in line with forecasts". In October, the company said in its half-year financial results that the game performed "below expectations".

=== Accolades ===
Year	Award	Category	Result	Ref.
2025	Golden Joystick Awards	Best Storytelling	Nominated	
2025	The Game Awards 2025	Games for Impact	Nominated	
2026	15th New York Game Awards	Herman Melville Award for Best Writing in a Game	Pending	
2026	15th New York Game Awards	Great White Way Award for Best Acting in a Game (Amelia Sargisson as Nora)	Pending	
2026	37th GLAAD Media Awards	Outstanding Video Game	Won	
