= The Great Villainess: Strategy of Lily =

2025 video game

- Developer: Alliance Arts, One or EIGHT, WSS Playground
- Publisher: Alliance Arts
- Platforms: Microsoft Windows; Nintendo Switch 2 PlayStation 5
- Release: Windows: WW: July 24, 2025; PS5, Switch 2: WW: December 2, 2026
- Mode: Single-player

The Great Villainess: Strategy of Lily is a 2025 turn-based strategy video game.

== Gameplay ==
Taking place in a historical setting with modern elements, the game follows Scarlet—an infamously violent duchess who is falsely accused of assassinating the Emperor—alongside her accomplice Lily, a livestreaming engineer.

During gameplay, the player is provided with a map of locations. Each turn, the player is allowed to move their units from one location to another connected location. Moving units to a location that contains enemy units triggers a turn-based battle that the player can control directly or automate. In battles, the player's units earn a shared resource called MP (Morale Points) from using attacks or taking damage, and MP can be spent to use stronger abilities. Units have HP (Horde Points), which function as health points while also determining attack power; if the player's units are occupying locations on the map that are linked to Scarlet's base, then the Supply Line will restore HP to those units outside of battle. The player is also given a regular opportunity to position Lily's airship on the map and use its abilities; using these livestream abilities costs energy, and fully depleting the airship's energy makes it unusable for a turn.

Lily has the ability to capture enemy generals (bosses), and the player is given the choice of sparing or executing these characters. Sparing generals allows the player to use them as units and can grant additional livestream effects, executing generals makes Scarlet stronger, and both decisions affect the game's story.

If either Scarlet or Lily dies, the player is shown a lighthearted game over cutscene titled Dead End Theater, where both characters discuss the previous battle among other things.

== Reception ==
Reception

Aggregate score
Aggregator	Score
Metacritic	78/100

Review scores
Publication	Score
RPGamer	3.5/5
Checkpoint Gaming	8/10

The Great Villainess: Strategy of Lily received generally favorable reviews, according to the review aggregation website Metacritic.

The A.V. Club praised the game's approach to gender roles and sapphic content, comparing Scarlet to other lesbian and bisexual protagonists in "villainess isekai" media.

At the 37th GLAAD Media Awards, The Great Villainess: Strategy of Lily was nominated for Outstanding Video Game.
