= Under the Christmas Tree =

2021 romantic comedy television film

- Promotional poster
- Genre: Romantic comedy Christmas; LGBTQ
- Written by: Michael J. Murray
- Directed by: Lisa Rose Snow
- Starring: Tattiawna Jones; Elise Bauman; Ricki Lake
- Original language: English

Production
- Running time: 84 minutes

Original release
- Network: Lifetime (U.S.)
- Release: December 19, 2021

Under the Christmas Tree is a 2021 romantic comedy Christmas television film directed by Lisa Rose Snow in her feature film directorial debut. The film premiered on Lifetime on December 19, 2021, as part of the network's "It's a Wonderful Lifetime" holiday movie slate. Telling the story of government worker Charlie (Tattiawna Jones) attempting to secure a Christmas tree from business owner Alma (Elise Bauman), the film was Lifetime's first lesbian Christmas movie. It received generally positive reviews and was nominated at the 33rd GLAAD Media Awards for Outstanding TV Movie.

== Plot ==
Under assignment from the state of Maine to locate and secure a Christmas tree for the annual tree lighting ceremony in the state's capital, "tree whisperer" Charlie Freemont and her assistant Rohan travel to the town of Camden. They find their ideal tree on the property of the Alma Beltran and her parents, the proprietors of a century-old Christmas goods business. The Beltrans receive a report from a consultant providing several ideas to modernize their business, which Alma, whose parents are retiring from the company at the end of the year, rebuffs. Charlie formally meets Alma at her friend Marie's pâtisserie, where the two hit it off.

Charlie and Rohan visit the Beltrans to ask about acquiring the tree, not knowing that Alma is their daughter. Although her parents favor the plan, Alma disagrees that the tree should be cut down. She texts Charlie to decline the offer and later, Charlie shows up at her business where the two spend time together. Alma's mother tells Charlie about the town's annual gingerbread decorating competition, which Charlie enters. She and Alma are randomly paired and win the event, after which point Charlie tells Alma she hopes Alma has reconsidered her offer to use the tree, but Alma has not.

The next day, Charlie invites Alma on a date to the pâtisserie, where the pair kisses. After the date, Alma learns that the consultant has recommended the Beltrans move their warehouse to Arizona, while Charlie learns that legally, she only needs Alma's parents' signatures to acquire the tree. She intends to tell Alma about this development but decides not to after the pair spends time viewing the tree together. On a phone call at a party that night, Rohan tells Sonal (his mother and Charlie's boss) that they have not yet secured the tree and accidentally delivers the news to her about not needing Alma's signature.

Sonal comes to town the next day. Charlie protests that she is still attempting to find a new tree, but after Alma happens by, Sonal makes Charlie tell Alma that they can take the tree without her permission. Alma leaves angrily. Charlie and Rohan go into a nearby reforestation project area and find a new tree after following the hoots of an owl Charlie saved in a previous year. Charlie and Alma tearfully say goodbye to each other. As Charlie is about to leave the next day, she receives the trophy she and Alma won from the gingerbread competition.

At the Camden tree lighting ceremony, Alma tells her parents she will not be moving the company to Arizona. Charlie appears and tells Alma that she was successful in finding a new tree and the she plans to apply to be the executive director of the reforestation project. The pair decide to attempt to start a relationship in Camden and the Beltrans invite Charlie onstage as a member of their family to light the tree with them.

== Cast ==
- Tattiawna Jones as Charlie Freemont
- Elise Bauman as Alma Beltran
- Ricki Lake as Marie
- Enrico Colantoni as Mr. Beltran
- Wendy Crewson as Isabella Beltran
- Shawn Ahmed as Rohan
- Sonia Dhillon Tully as Sonal

== Production ==
Under the Christmas Tree was the feature film directorial debut of Lisa Rose Snow. Michael J. Murray wrote the script for the film, which was the first produced by the Lifetime network to feature a lesbian love story. Murray had previously written a number of other Christmas movies including The Christmas Setup (2020), Lifetime's first Christmas movie to feature gay male leads.

Principal photography for the film took place primarily in Ottawa, Ontario Canada, in September 2021. The film was announced in late September as one of 35 holiday movies produced by Lifetime in its 2021 "It's a Wonderful Lifetime" holiday movie slate.

== Release ==
Under the Christmas Tree premiered on Lifetime on December 19, 2021. It was also made available to stream on Lifetime's website. The network promoted the film as its first lesbian Christmas movie.

== Reception ==
In Autostraddle, Heather Hogan called the movie "a very sweet, very low stakes romantic comedy" and described it as subversive for being a straightforward, tropey Christmas romance movie featuring two queer female leads. Brett White, writing for Decider, praised Under the Christmas Tree not just as a quality queer Christmas romantic comedy but a quality Christmas romantic comedy in general. White lauded the performances of Jones, Bauman, and Colantoni, and wrote favorably of Snow's direction, which he called "visually interesting, where camera shots enhance the chemistry between performers". In Slate, Christina Cauterucci described the film as "a delightful addition to the chaste holiday rom-com canon" but found a joke about a strap-on dildo in the film incongruous, calling it "bad, bad writing". Reflecting on the joke, Cauterucci wrote that "Queer love is so mainstream it's corny", describing Alma and Charlie's relationship as "played as a parent-friendly, almost childlike endeavor".

Under the Christmas Tree was nominated at the 33rd GLAAD Media Awards for Outstanding TV Movie, ultimately losing to Netflix's gay Christmas movie Single All the Way.
