= Heaven Will Be Mine =

2018 visual novel video game

- Developers: Pillow Fight Games; Worst Girl Games (mobile)
- Publisher: Pillow Fight Games
- Director: Aevee Bee
- Artist: Max Schwartz
- Writer: Aevee Bee
- Composer: Alec Lambert
- Engine: Unity
- Platforms: Microsoft Windows; OS X; Linux; iOS
- Release: July 25, 2018
- Genre: Visual Novel
- Mode: Single-player

Heaven Will Be Mine is a sci-fi romance visual novel developed by American studios Pillow Fight Games and Worst Girl Games for Windows, Mac, Linux, and iOS. The story is set in an alternate history post-Cold War universe wherein humanity has split into three warring factions, known as the Memorial Foundation, Cradle's Graces, and the Celestial Mechanics. Over the course of the game the player, through combat interactions with the other two faction pilots, can gradually push one of these three factions toward dominance over space and humanity's future.

The player can follow the story by selecting one of three characters, each with her own unique backstory, personality, and faction alignment, though this alignment may change over the course of the narrative depending on player choices.

Heaven Will Be Mine's gameplay is primarily text-based, with certain situations where the player can make decisions that will determine the outcome of the game.

== Gameplay ==
A potential choice in one of the game's paths.

The gameplay in Heaven Will Be Mine is focused primarily around player choice. The game is divided into 8 days wherein the player may choose from two missions, either of which will increment the "day" amount by one. The mission picked per day will not prevent the player from picking the other mission the following day, and the mission selected per day does not change the occurrences within each mission.

After a mission begins, a text exchange will play between the player's chosen character and her support technician, followed by the mission itself beginning and usually an encounter with an enemy pilot. At the culmination of each mission, the player will be faced with a choice, which may involve intentionally losing a fight to win an opponent's affection or something less tangible, such as fighting with words rather than fighting with weapons. Each decision will be marked with "Betray" or "Loyal," which will signify whether or not said decision will align with the player character's default faction. Every "loyal" decision will increment the player's alignment by 12.5%, and every "betray" decision will increment the player's alignment toward the enemy's faction by 25%. The player alignment can be viewed on the "Alignment" page between missions.

Whichever faction the player has the most affinity with by the game's end will trigger that faction's ending.

== Plot ==
The background of Heaven Will Be Mine begins after humanity has reached the cosmos. The "Cold War", in this alternate universe, instead refers to humanity collectively coming together to combat what it believes to be a hostile alien presence referred to as an "Existential Threat." Humanity has built a score of space-traversing fighting robots, known as Ship-Selves, to combat this threat. These machines connect to their pilots, effectively allowing their pilots to become their ships, sensing what they sense, feeling what they feel. The space program also developed a Lunar Gravity Well Generator in order for these ships, and humanity in general, to survive in the vacuum of space.

Despite the initial reference to the Existential Threat as a nemesis of all humanity, the Threat is revealed to be little more than a shadow created by the gravitational presence of humanity itself, and is easily destroyed. The "Earth" faction, known as the Memorial Foundation, brands the space program a failure, and demands that the colonies of humans in space and on Mars leave their colonies and return to Earth. The Martian colonies, known as Cradle's Graces, declare independence instead, refusing to return to Earth, and a stalemate begins between them and the Memorial Foundation. While this occurs, the Celestial Mechanics faction, composed of the other space colonies, recognizes that the Memorial Foundation has branded all of those in space as mutants, which it will use as a pretense to weaponize the discontent still simmering on Earth after the initial failure to find an Existential Threat. They devise their own plan to take control of the Lunar Gravity Well and all of the space-dwelling colonies.

Heaven Will Be Mine's plot, from this point, may take a number of different directions, depending on the character chosen and the arrangement of player choices afterwards. Whatever the arrangement of choices, the player's character will engage with the other two factions' pilots in combat, though this combat occurs only in text and is often interspersed by romantic feints between both pilots. Most of the choices found in each mission will allow the player to grow closer to another faction's pilot, thereby betraying their own faction in order to garner the affection of both the opposing faction and the opposing pilot.

=== Themes ===
The writing team for Heaven Will Be Mine has stated that many of the themes that appear within the game are more developed, more mature versions of the themes found in the team's prior game We Know the Devil. Such themes include social isolation, lesbianism, homophobia, transphobia, and self-actualization, among others.

== Reception ==
USgamer lauded the game for its "vibe, driven heavily by its pulsing music, UI, and art design." Polygon and Wired have noted that the game's story is rather abstract and may be difficult to follow for those who do not play through it repeatedly.

Colin Spacetwinks for Giant Bomb nominated Heaven Will Be Mine for the number 2 spot on their list of best games of 2018, citing the "dreamlike drifting internal monologues" and the game's modern use of communication as reason for its placement. Vice Waypoint's Austin Walker gave the game a similar position on a similar list, as he praised the game's protagonists and world-building.
