= Ikenfell =

2020 video game

- Developer: Happy Ray Games
- Publisher: Humble Games
- Programmer: Chevy Ray Johnston
- Artists: Chevy Ray Johnston; Hunter Russell
- Writers: Chevy Ray Johnston; Joanna Blackhart; Jeriko Green; Aivi Tran
- Composers: Aivi & Surasshu; Sabrielle Augustin
- Platforms: Microsoft Windows; macOS; Nintendo Switch; PlayStation 4; Xbox One
- Release: WW: October 8, 2020
- Genre: Role-playing
- Mode: Single-player

Ikenfell (/ˈɪkɛnfɛl/ IK-en-fel) is a role-playing video game developed by Happy Ray Games and published by Humble Games. It was released for Windows, macOS, Nintendo Switch, PlayStation 4, and Xbox One on October 8, 2020.

The tactical combat system involves players battling on an isometric grid, but also includes timing-based elements akin to the Paper Mario series. In the story, the player initially controls Maritte Hildegaard, a non-magical teenage girl who journeys to the titular magical school Ikenfell, in an attempt to investigate the disappearance of her witch sister Safina. While trying to enter the school, she suddenly gains magical powers, concurring with mysterious changes in magic that some link to the mysterious Dark Fold.

Reviews from critics were mixed. Some reviewers largely praised the game's combat and story, while others described it as having potential, but let down by flaws in those systems.

== Gameplay ==
Ikenfell's battle system features player characters (here, Rook, Pertisia, and Petronella) on an isometric grid.

Ikenfell is a turn-based tactical role-playing video game. It uses various 2.5D perspectives to display characters and the game world. Like older Paper Mario games and Super Mario RPG, the outcome of both player and enemy moves during combat depends on timed button presses. The playing field is composed of a grid, upon which both the player and enemies can move, with their position affecting what moves can be performed and how efficient they are. As the game advances, the attack patterns and timing become more complex, providing greater difficulty. For accessibility, there are options to both partially and completely disable combat timing.

Characters are managed with a party system; although the player initially only controls Maritte, they later gain control of other characters, each with their own unique skillset. Three characters in the player's battle can engage in battle at any time; these can be changed at save points (which are represented by cats).

Like most traditional Japanese-style RPGs, gameplay also consists of parts outside battle which characters can navigate. Much of Ikenfell's gameplay involves these, which include exploration, adventure, and puzzle-solving portions. There are no random encounters and as such fightable enemies are always visible in the world. Battle only ensues if the party reaches one, allowing the player to evade combat.

== Plot ==
Players initially control Maritte Hildegaard, a teenager who travels to the magical school of Ikenfell to find her sister Safina, who has gone missing since summer break. Although she is initially non-magical, she soon mysteriously develops pyromancy while trying to enter Ikenfell, after which she learns bizarre and unprecedented magical events began occurring across the school grounds not long after the students left for the break, and thus the school is currently on lockdown. She encounters non-binary alchemist Petronella, a close friend of Safina, who has had an emotional breakdown due to the latter's disappearance, and tells Maritte of a secret passage of Safina's they use to get into the school.

Once inside, they discover Safina's dorm room blocked by a magic seal. After fighting lightning magician Gilda, who is attracted to Maritte, they join up with fellow student Rook. With Rook and Safina's rival Pertisia, they successfully enter it by disguising Maritte as her sister. Inside, they retrieve the Prism Heart, a creation of Safina that allows the user to see through deception, which she had used for research with older student Ima. Meeting with Ima and Gilda, they go to the Summerstone, a large orb which imprisons the Dark Fold, a destructive wave of magic seemingly precipitating the strange events. At the stone, they successfully fight experienced coven magician Bax and his partner Ibn, who are also looking for Safina. Using the Prism Heart, they reveal that the Summerstone is merely an illusion, and Safina destroyed the actual stone.

Believing her sister wanted to free the Dark Fold, Maritte has a panic attack and rids herself of her magic, and decides to leave Ikenfell. Ima asks the school's raven deity to remove Maritte and get help, but it refuses to do either, instead sending the party to the ancient ruins of old Ikenfell. There, they discover that a squad tried to defend an important plant, the Sapling, from the Dark Fold. Aeldra, the current headmistress of Ikenfell, was the only survivor, using her friends' magic powers to construct the Summerstone, imprisoning both the Dark Fold and the Sapling. Motivated by getting answers and her friends, Maritte regains her magic. In the library's archives, her party finds an old book that explains the cycle of the two magical seasons. Every thousand years, the Sapling dies, causing a new generation of magic to arise, and the old generation to be forgotten; this process is the cause of Ikenfell's unusual magical events, and trying to prevent the Sapling's death would lead to "great catastrophe", in repetition of the fall of old Ikenfell a thousand years ago. The deaths of her friends, however, is causing Aeldra uncontrollable grief, which she can only abate through expelling her pain into a cauldron, and has wished to preserve the Sapling in fears that freeing it will also free the Dark Fold: Safina, having found out the truth of the Sapling, had tried to stop her.

Persuading several professors to oppose her, they decide to confront Aeldra, as the school is slowly collapsing. The party arrives at the Spelltower, where Aeldra is guarding the Sapling. Finding the doors blocked, Pertisia reveals she created a secret passage like Safina's, but suffered injuries from it that traumatized her, and she uses her powers to create a new passage. As they try convincing Aeldra to stop her vain attempt to preserve the Sapling, her stress breaks her cauldron, overwhelming her and making her lose contact with reality. Convinced she is defeating the Dark Fold, she kills Bax and attacks Maritte's party; the party defeats and awakens her from her trance. Distraught at the loss of his lover Bax, Ibn steals the Sapling. Revealing his immense power in the spiritual realm, his anger makes him lose his sense of self and become a monster. After defeating Ibn, the party uses Petronella's magic to revive Bax, who calms Ibn back to normality, and they free the Sapling.

Petronella and Safina join the coven as repayment for saving Ibn and Bax. Aeldra retires, leaving the role of headmistress to Ima and dueling teacher Radegund, who begin research into the new knowledge created by the next magical generation. In the epilogue, Rook and Gilda travel to distant lands to make new discoveries. Pertisia resumes her old music career and begins a relationship with Maritte, and they both agree to go on the journey as well.

== Development ==
Before developing Ikenfell, Chevy Ray Johnston, the game's lead developer, had worked as a contract programmer for Bandai Namco, as well as on a variety of indie games. He had developed a custom engine, but failed to complete any of his game ideas. After reading Rainbow Rowell's young adult novel Carry On, he was inspired to make a video game about a magic school using his tools. Originally, the game's premise was based around a witch completing a final quest before dying of illness. It was also an action RPG, but Johnston decided the space required for combat limited level design.

Johnston's custom C# engine, based on top of SDL2 and OpenGL, allowed him to port it to a wide variety of platforms. The engine also included Lua scripting for control puzzles, events, and scenes; and a GUI frontend, including a custom map and scene editor, which were used to accelerate the development process.

After a few years into development, the game was funded via Kickstarter in 2016. Later, Johnston also brought on consultant Joanna Blackhart to ensure that the game's portrayal of LGBT characters was accurate and inoffensive, a process that led to a "rewriting" of parts of the story. It was featured at the 2019 Electronic Entertainment Expo as part of its inclusion in the Xbox Game Pass, before being released on October 8, 2020.

In September 2021, Limited Run Games announced a physical release of the game, with pre-orders beginning on the 24th. A Japanese localisation produced by 8-4 was also revealed that month, set for a November release.

=== Art and game design ===
Despite being an inexperienced pixel artist, Johnston drew the majority of the game's art, choosing the style as it was easy to iterate upon. Much of the game was developed in a public library, influencing its artistic direction and plot; he borrowed vintage books from the collections to use as references. Its visual design was inspired by games such as Mother 3 and The Legend of Zelda: Link's Awakening. Each character was designed to have a distinct look and silhouette. Buildings were "white-boxed", with their layout being designed first, akin to actual construction.

The timing-based elements of the game's combat were inspired by Super Mario RPG and the Mario & Luigi games, among others. Johnston designed each party member's moves so they could be used in many different ways, while still being fundamental to the character, comparing this philosophy to Mario's basic skillset. As he disliked magic points, he decided to make magical spells free to use during combat.

Steven Universe composers Aivi & Surasshu worked on the soundtrack of the game alongside Sabrielle Augustin, who helped finish the soundtrack after Aivi suffered an injury leaving them unable to complete some work. As the game was inspired by the landscape of Canada, some tracks incorporate elements from Canadian folk music. They also chose an ambient style atypical of video game music, a decision influenced by The Legend of Zelda: Breath of the Wild, the game's narrative elements, and their experience composing for TV shows. Vocals were incorporated into some of the songs after seeing their successful usage in games like Transistor; initially, the composers wanted to do a vocal song for each character, but were unable to find a place for all of them in the story.

== Reception ==
Reception

Aggregate scores
Aggregator	Score
Metacritic	NS: 73/100; PC: 69/100
OpenCritic	57% recommend

Review scores
Publication	Score
GameSpot	6/10
Hardcore Gamer	4/5
Siliconera	7/10

According to gaming review aggregator Metacritic, Ikenfell's reception was mixed. Fellow review aggregator OpenCritic assessed that the game received strong approval, being recommended by 57% of critics. Both GameSpot and Siliconera described it as having potential, but being let down by flaws in the story and combat. Other sites were more positive, like Hardcore Gamer, which said it was "a trip well worth taking", and GameRant, which described it as having the potential to be a "cultural touchstone".

Although reviewers generally liked the game's combat system, they felt it could be frustrating at times. Hardcore Gamer reviewer Kyle LeClair described it as "challenging and fun", and Jason Rochlin of GameRant commended the game's tactical variety and complexity. PJ O'Reilly of Nintendo Life pointed out the "impressive range of enemy types" among other elements as contributing to the game's strategical depth. However, LeClair, Slant magazine, and GameSpot reviewer Hope Corrigan all criticised the excessive variability of the timing-based attack system, although multiple reviewers pointed out that the game provides an optional setting that allows players to enable easier combat. Slant also complained about the combat design, stating that it involved "selecting an attack, and then cancelling that move to place them in a different space once you see that they're not properly positioned".

The story also received both praise and criticism, with reviewers praising it for its in-depth examination of characters, but some also claimed it was too derivative of Harry Potter and unrealistic at times. LeClair described it as an "engrossing piece of work", but somewhat unoriginal. Corrigan was more negative, describing it as "unusual", criticising implausible and on-the-nose elements in the plot, and the incongruous manner in which LGBT issues were included. Conversely, both Rochlin and Slant lauded these elements, with the former stating that the game wore "its progressiveness on its sleeve" and provided a much-needed focus on the importance of relationships.

Reviewers largely praised the game's art and music, noting the quality of the chiptune tracks. However, reactions to the vocal segments were more disparate, with LeClair stating that they "enhance the mood even further", but Corrigan calling them poor quality, remarking that she was tempted to turn down the volume. O'Reilly criticised the pixel artstyle, calling it overused.

=== Awards ===
Ikenfell was nominated for several awards, including categories in the 32nd GLAAD Media Awards and the SXSW Gaming Awards 2021.

Award	Category	Result	Ref.
32nd GLAAD Media Awards	Outstanding Video Game	Nominated	
Gayming Awards 2021	Best LGBTQ Indie Game	Nominated	
SXSW Gaming Awards 2021	Indie Game of the Year	Nominated	
Canadian Game Awards	Best Debut Indie	Nominated	
