= If Found... =

2020 visual novel

- Developer: Dreamfeel
- Publisher: Annapurna Interactive
- Designer: Llaura McGee
- Programmer: Iris Sabo
- Artists: Liadh Young; Llaura McGee; Brianna Chew
- Writers: Eve Golden Woods; Llaura McGee
- Platform: macOS
- Release: Microsoft Windows, macOS, iOS: WW: May 19, 2020; Nintendo Switch: WW: October 22, 2020
- Genre: Visual novel
- Mode: Single-player

If Found... is a visual novel developed by Dreamfeel and published by Annapurna Interactive in May 2020 for Microsoft Windows, macOS, and iOS and October 2020 for the Nintendo Switch. The game has the player advance through two interleaved stories by erasing journal entries or images. One story follows a space explorer named Cassiopeia trying to prevent a black hole from destroying the Earth, while the other follows a young transgender woman named Kasio in a small Irish village in December 1993 as she navigates her relationships with her family and friends. The two stories alternate chapters, connecting metaphorically.

Design for the game by Dreamfeel founder Llaura McGee started in 2016, with the eventual development of the game by a small team taking two years. Elements of the story's emotional arc were taken from McGee's personal experiences, though the game features concepts from several developers and is not autobiographical. The primary goal for the game was to connect players to the emotions of the story, with the mechanics of the game chosen to further that aim. Critics praised the game's artwork and story, especially for its emotional connection to the player via the erasing mechanic. If Found... was nominated for the "Games for Impact Award" at The Game Awards 2020, for "Outstanding Video Game" at the 32nd GLAAD Media Awards, and for "Outstanding Achievement for an Independent Game" at the 24th Annual D.I.C.E. Awards.

== Gameplay ==
If Found... is a visual novel, wherein the player advances through scenes by erasing journal entries or images using their cursor or finger as the eraser. While the player in some scenes chooses the order to erase elements, such as different parts of a journal entry, and decides how quickly to erase, the game progresses linearly through scenes without deviation with the exception of a few choices in an epilogue chapter. The narrative is split between two interleaved stories, with alternating chapters: a science fiction story of a space explorer named Doctor Cassiopeia discovering a black hole that will destroy the Earth, and the journal entries following the story of Kasio, a student in Dublin returning to her hometown in Achill Island, Ireland for December 1993. Both stories take place over the course of four weeks.

== Plot ==
Scene of the abandoned house, with the image half-erased to show a nighttime view of the house beneath

The science fiction chapters of the story follow Doctor Cassiopeia as she journeys towards Planet X, only to discover a black hole that is rapidly expanding and will soon destroy the Earth. Cassiopeia investigates the black hole to try to find a way to stop it, assisted by occasional messages from an unknown source who names himself "Control". Cassiopeia discovers that the black hole is creating wormholes that she can use to jump to Earth ahead of the black hole, while Control finds that the black hole was created due to an image in the future sending a signal back in time. Control reveals his name to be McHugh, and tells her that when she makes it to Earth, they will have less than a day to make it to Ireland where the image sends the signal.

The journal chapters follow Kasio, a transgender woman who has just completed her master's degree at a university in Dublin and is returning to her hometown in Achill Island during December 1993. Kasio has a strained relationship with her older brother Fergal and her mother Brid, which she attributes both to the stress on the family after her father's death some years prior as well as her own inability to conform to the social norms of the islanders. After a fight with her mother over Kasio's feminine clothes and appearance, Kasio runs away. She meets a friend, Colum, who invites her to stay with him and the rest of his band in the abandoned, decrepit house that the band is squatting in. Kasio lives with Colum, his boyfriend Jack, and their younger bandmate Shans for several weeks, slowly adjusting to the feeling of being with people who seem to accept her as she is despite their limited resources and tenuous living situation. She begins to grow close to Shans, bonding over their shared difficulties in fitting in with Achill culture—Kasio due to her gender expression, and Shans due to his race and uneasiness with traditional Achill masculinity. They break into Kasio's family's house to get her clothes, but are discovered by her brother, who berates her for upsetting her mother and shaming the family by failing to fit in. After the band's first show, Kasio and Shans take drugs and alcohol and watch the stars through a hole in the abandoned house's roof. The next morning, Shans informs Kasio that she had agreed to run away together to Dublin as a couple. When Kasio declines, Shans leaves the house and the band. Kasio, Colum, and Jack are evicted from the increasingly decrepit house and stay with Colum's aunt Maggy, despite Colum and Jack being upset with Kasio.

Kasio attempts to reconcile with her family for Christmas dinner, but is berated by her brother for living in an abandoned house with social misfits and then moving to stay with the quietly gay Maggy instead of coming home to her family, while her mother continues to express confusion about Kasio's choices. Kasio feels distraught by her estrangement from her family and unworthy to stay with Maggy. She is rejected by Shans, who tells her he wants to be "normal", and Kasio breaks into the abandoned house again. Depressed, she stays there despite the freezing temperatures, not responding to searches by her brother or friends who approach the house but do not enter the now dangerous building. She burns her journal for warmth before succumbing to illness and hypothermia.

As the science fiction story concludes, Cassiopeia reaches Earth, only to discover that McHugh is an accountant who accidentally managed to talk to her. They take the image, a child's drawing of a space scene previously shown to have been drawn by Kasio as a child, and put it in the letterbox for a woman who looks like Brid to find before waiting for the black hole to hit the Earth. Kasio awakens in the abandoned house on December 31, having been found by her mother. The epilogue covers a series of journal entries constructed by the player covering scattered details of the next years, such as Kasio and her mother growing closer, Maggy learning to live without hiding being a lesbian, and Shans changing their name to Anu and coming out as non-binary. The science fiction story has scenes of Cassiopeia traveling and bringing scattered people together after the destruction of the black hole. The player chooses how Kasio feels about each development from a few options.

== Development ==
The game was developed as the first game by Irish developer Dreamfeel. Studio director Llaura McGee was the lead writer and designer. It was published by Annapurna Interactive. Initial development on the game began in 2016. McGee sent a proposed design for "a swashbuckling space opera starring cats" to artist Liadh Young, who responded with concept art, and the two began developing game concepts. McGee wanted to create a game with a team rather than as a small solo project like her previous games, but wanted to keep it focused on the strengths of the people involved, such as Young's comics art background, and began to build a small team. Some early concepts included an "anti-dating sim" or a game set in a "witch's academy" based around completing a diary through different tasks, but McGee and the other developers felt it was better to create a story and then let the game mechanics serve it to create a "complete experience". She was interested at the time with notebooks and marginalia, and the team focused on that idea for the game. McGee and lead writer Eve Golden Woods describe the development process for If Found..., once the design was decided on, as taking two years, with a team of "four or five core people" plus additional help working on it. Ideas were contributed from the whole team; the final credits list nine contributors from Dreamfeel. The team created a demo for the game to demonstrate at events, but found it difficult to finish the project, which McGee says was a consistent pattern for them. They credit publisher Annapurna, who signed on to the project partway through, with pushing them to complete it in a polished fashion.

The first part of the final design for the game was about a diary that the player would erase, and the studio then developed the idea of a woman in her 20s and her difficulties with her relationships. McGee, a trans woman from a coastal village in Ireland, drew heavily on her emotions growing up there in the 90s, though the story itself is not autobiographical. The interleaved science fiction story was intended to add an element of magical realism, as well as express the emotional feeling of a personal world falling apart with as a more direct metaphor. The role of the black hole changed during development; while the final version has been described as "the physical manifestation of the terror, loneliness, shame and self-hatred that she encounters, all-consuming and impossible to outrun", earlier drafts had it as being a dark hole within Kasio preventing her from having relationships, or missing the relationships altogether. McGee felt that the game "missed its emotional gravity" without it, however. McGee has said that the game, which is about two hours long, is intended to be short and not play longer than necessary for the story. The game initially did not have the epilogue; it, along with extra scenes and artwork, were added to all versions of the game for the release for the Switch. McGee stated in an interview that her primary goal for the game was to get players to relate to the feelings of the story, and to recognize that expressing love for people is more important than fully understanding them. The game was released for Microsoft Windows, macOS, and iOS devices on May 19, 2020, and for the Nintendo Switch on October 22, 2020.

== Reception ==
If Found...

Aggregate score
Aggregator	Score
Metacritic	84% (PC); 88% (iOS); 80% (Switch)

Review scores
Publication	Score
Destructoid	9/10
GameSpot	9/10
Pocket Gamer	4.5/5
USgamer	4.5/5
Eurogamer Italy	8/10

If Found... was nominated for the "Games for Impact Award" at The Game Awards 2020, for "Outstanding Achievement for an Independent Game" at the 24th Annual D.I.C.E. Awards, and for "Outstanding Video Game" at the 32nd GLAAD Media Awards. An early short demo was exhibited in several events in 2016, winning awards for best Game Design, emerging talent, and the Grand Prix overall award at the Irish Design Awards in November.

Critics were largely positive towards the game, focusing primarily on the way the writing and artwork, combined with the act of erasing, formed an emotional connection with the player. Michael Higham of GameSpot praised the "stunning yet minimal" art style. Hirun Cryer of USGamer similarly described the art style as "brilliant", while Cameron Bald of Pocket Gamer praised both the art style and sound design for drawing in the player and Ellen Causey of GamesRadar+ said that the artwork and sound effects at times had her "transfixed". The erasing mechanic was also praised by reviewers, with USGamer's reviewer commenting on the way it allowed for transitions between scenes, while Nicole Carpenter of Polygon focused on how erasing connected the player to Kasio's story and caused the player to decide how fast to advance due to how the story was making them feel. CJ Andriessen of Destructoid said that the mechanic had a "profound effect" on them, forcing them to acknowledge that not only could they not change Kasio's past, they also had to erase the good with the bad.

The story of If Found... was largely praised; Destructoid's Andriessen said that "no other game has spoken to my personal experience" as being transgender. GamesRadar+'s Causey said that the writing gave her a "whirlwind of emotions", while Alessandro Baravalle of Eurogamer Italy said that it moved him and caused him to cry. Higham of GameSpot praised the writing's "heartening adherence to the game's Irish setting", saying that the use of Irish terms, slang, and culture, along with the footnotes explaining them, helped pull the player into Kasio's experience. The Eurogamer Italy review found the game overall to be a little short and the science fiction story to be unnecessary, though Pocket Gamer said that the erasing felt like Kasio's past being swallowed by the black hole, connecting the two parts. USGamer said the game's "true beauty is in examination of life", while Bald of Pocket Gamer claimed that it was its "overwhelming empathy – the game's unconditional love for its people and setting – that carries it towards excellence". Bald concluded that the game was "an essential visual novel", and Andriessen of Destructoid said that it was "the most brilliant game I've played this year".
