= Road to Empress =

2025 video game

- Developer: New One Studio
- Publishers: New One Studio; Ariel; Sixjoy Hong Kong Limited
- Director: Zhi Zhu
- Producers: Guan Dan; Hao Long Xiao; Zhao Nan
- Series: Road to Empress
- Platforms: Windows; iOS; Android
- Release: September 9, 2025
- Genre: Historical drama
- Mode: Single-player

Road to Empress (Chinese: 女王的游戏：盛世天下) is a 2025 Chinese interactive film historical drama video game developed and published by New One Studio. Presented in full-motion video and released worldwide on September 9, 2025, players follow protagonist Empress Wu, who becomes China's first and only woman emperor during the Zhou dynasty (690–705). The video game sold over a million copies within its first two weeks.

== Gameplay ==
Set during the Tang dynasty, players control the choices of Wu Zetian, with the goal of surviving the royal court and ultimately rising to aristocratic power. It features multiple choices and quick time events, having more than 100 possible endings.

== Plot ==
Wu Yuanzhao begins as a concubine of Emperor Taizong, finding herself becoming a target of Liu Xi, a childhood friend who holds a grudge against her family for falsely accusing Liu Xi's father of a crime; the cruel Consort Wei of Preciousness, who intimidates the younger consorts for entertainment; and her own aunt, the Consort Yang of Elegance, who preys on enemies' weaknesses in order to become the next empress.

As the story progresses, the protagonist has the two princes, Li Zhi and Li Tai, express a romantic interest in her. She also gains a friendship with Princess Gaoyang, though it shatters after failing to rescue the princess's beloved Bianji when their forbidden romance is discovered. Yuanzhao also finds companionship with Rui'er, a cheerful young palace maid.

Strategically cutting off Consort Wei's sources of power, including winning the loyalty of Xi Xin and thwarting her aunt with the help of her other aunt, Consort Dowager Yang, Wu Yuanzhao is momentarily safe. Following Emperor Taizong's death, Li Zhi is announced the Crown ruler. Due to the custom where childless consorts of deceased emperors are permanently confined to a monastery, Yuanzhao is sent away to live her days as a Buddhist nun at Ganye Temple. There, she is treated cruelly by the other girls and prevented contact from anyone in the palace. Instead of being disheartened, Yuanzhao is determined to rise again.

== Development and release ==
Since 2017, New One Studio looked into interactive dramas, their first being The Invisible Guardian in 2019, which received positive response from players and became the highest-selling title on Steam that year. They decided to explore Empress Wu's story, as she "is not only a symbol of power but also an outstanding representative of a woman struggling to survive in a patriarchal society." The footage was filmed at Hengdian World Studios in Dongyang, Zhejiang Province, which spanned across nearly four months, followed by eight months in post-production.

For the casting process, executive producer Demi Guan estimated over 2,000 actors were screened. Rather than selecting the main lead based on notability, "the most important criterion [was relatability]" and "strong versatility—the ability to embody youthful, girlish energy while also carrying the weight of the later court intrigue scenes."

New One Studio participated in BitSummit 2025 from July 18 to 20 for promotion. Road to Empress was released on 9 September 2025 for Windows, iOS, and Android.

== Reception ==
Metacritic, which uses a weighted average, assigned the game a score of 84 out of 100, based on 6 critics, indicating "generally favorable" reviews.

The Financial Times' Tom Faber wrote, "The tone is enjoyably camp, with somebody accused of treachery or condemned to death every few moments, and there’s a pleasure in learning to master the ultimate skills of the concubine: patience, caution and utter ruthlessness."

Victoria Sykes of Adventure Game Hotspot called it "an extremely high-quality production" with "beautiful sets and a fascinating plot full of intrigue and cutthroat treason"; however, she criticized the story's linearity, where only the correct decision let the player continue and incorrect ones did not lead to different storylines. Conversely, Polygon's Claire Lewis "found that these limited choices actually added to the game's charm".

Road to Empress sold over 2 million copies by June 2026.

== Sequel ==
The sequel, Road to Empress II, was released on June 8, 2026. It serves as the conclusion, where the protagonist ascends to power and must maintain it against internal and external threats.

== Awards ==
Award	Date of ceremony	Category	Result	Ref.
GLAAD Media Awards	March 5, 2026	Outstanding Video Game	Nominated	
