= Alec Fischer =

Documentary Filmmaker

Alec Fischer is a documentary filmmaker and LGBTQ+ advocate based in Minneapolis, Minnesota. His work primarily focuses on stories about people living in the Midwest region of the United States.

He is the recipient of four Upper Midwest Emmy Awards from 8 nominations, and has been nominated for numerous national awards including a GLAAD Media Award and an EWA National Award for Education Reporting.

== Early life and education ==
Fischer grew up in Edina, Minnesota and is a 2012 graduate of Edina High School. He attended the University of Wisconsin-Milwaukee before transferring to the University of Minnesota, Twin Cities, where he graduated in 2016.

== Early Career and LGBTQ+ Advocacy Work ==
In 2012, Fischer created his first documentary while a senior in high school. The 45-minute long film, titled Minnesota Nice?, presented real stories from students across the state of Minnesota talking about their experiences being bullied at school. After graduating high school, Fischer toured across Minnesota and the Midwest region with the film, speaking to students and educators about creating safe school environments for all students.

In 2014, he used his platform to lobby as a student advocate for the passage of the Safe And Supportive Schools Act at the Minnesota State Capitol. When passed, the legislation made Minnesota's policies towards bullying prevention among the strongest in the country.

As a sophomore in college, Fischer co-drafted legislation to ban conversion therapy against minors in Minnesota. Working with partners including GLAAD and Change.org, Fischer started a petition that gathered more than 100,000 signatures in support of the legislation being introduced and passed by Minnesota Senate and House Leaders.

In 2014, Fischer was named a global Dalai Lama Fellow for his film and LGBTQ+ advocacy work.

== Career ==
Fischer was fired from his full-time marketing job in 2018, which he credits as the push for him to pursue filmmaking full-time.

In 2020, Fischer directed and produced the short documentary BUJO: Rise of the Bullet Journal. The film explored the origin story of the Bullet Journal system and featured interviews with creator Ryder Carroll and users across the United States.

Fischer's debut documentary series, Covid Confessions (2021-present), highlights pandemic stories from more than 300 workers across 40 industries impacted by COVID-19 in Minnesota. The first 6 episodes of the series feature stories from nurses, teachers, grocery workers, drag performers, restaurant workers, and fitness professionals, and were published independently in 2021. The series received national recognition, including being nominated for a 2022 GLAAD Media Award, an EWA National Award for Education Reporting, and being named as a 2021 global finalist for best "Digital Video Storytelling, Series" by the Online News Association. The series was also nominated for 8 Upper Midwest Emmy Awards, winning 4 in October 2021. The remaining episodes were scheduled for release in 2022–2023.

== Filmography ==
=== Documentary Film ===
- Minnesota Nice? (2012)
- BUJO: Rise of the Bullet Journal (2020)
- Covid Confessions (2021-present)
