= We Know the Devil =

2015 video game

- Developer: Date Nighto
- Publisher: Date Nighto
- Director: Max Schwartz
- Producer: Jo Fu
- Programmer: Conrad Kreyling
- Artist: Max Schwartz
- Writer: Aevee Bee
- Composer: Alec Lambert
- Platforms: Windows, MacOS
- Release: WW: September 12, 2015
- Genre: Visual novel
- Mode: Single-player

We Know the Devil is a visual novel developed and published by Date Nighto. It was released on September 12, 2015 for Microsoft Windows and MacOS, before receiving a Steam release on February 15, 2016. On July 4, 2016, a separate art book titled The Art of We Know the Devil was published on itch.io by game artist Max Schwartz, followed by a March 19, 2017, itch.io release of the game, this time with a free supplementary demo serving the purpose of a prequel.

The game was positively received by critics, who cited its distinctive art style and themes.

== Gameplay ==
As a visual novel, the gameplay consists of clicking through text to cause the story to move on, until a choice is presented. Choices are presented as groupings of characters, with the characters chosen being involved in the scene that follows. This is generally a pairing, to the exclusion of a third.

== Plot ==
The game's plot is magic realist, and takes place at a Christian summer camp where misbehaving teenagers are sent to confront the Devil. The three main characters are named Neptune, Jupiter, and Venus.

They are sent to a cabin in the woods overnight to confront the Devil, who, along with God, can be spoken to over the radio. The ending can change depending on who has a relationship with whom. In three of the endings, the character who was most excluded becomes the Devil and goes through a monstrous transformation. If an equal amount of time is spent with each character, there is a fourth ending, in which all three choose to become the Devil. Additionally, the narration switches from male to female pronouns for Venus, as she comes to terms with her identity as a transgender girl.

== Development ==
The game's writer, Aevee Bee, stated that the game was created with three main characters in order to explore how, in the process of creating friendships, other bonds must also be weakened. In the game itself, while two characters can form a close relationship, one character must generally be left out. This was intended to be a difficult choice in order to parallel real relationships, where everyone is equally deserving of attention but a natural closeness draws certain people together.

The game's main characters were influenced by the Sailor Scouts of Sailor Moon. The "strong female role models and explicit gay relationships" of the series made it a "rallying point" for "young queer women of the 90's", making it a foil for the stifling rural, religious setting that forces the characters to hide their sexuality.

The game was made available on Date Nighto for $6.66 USD. The developers attempted to set the same price for it on Steam, but were initially unable to due to Steam's price brackets. As of 2026, the Steam version is priced at $6.66 USD.

== Reception ==
Raini Goncalves wrote favorably on the game's critique of queer coding as social deviance in Daimōnd 1: 109.8 FM, with comparisons being made to both Watchmen and Dark Knight Returns.

The work directly influenced Daughter of God, a fansong by artist PhemieC released on SoundCloud, and was listed as a thematic and stylistic influence for the visual novel God is in the Radio. It is listed by the developer rosesrot as a thematic influence upon the game Seraphim Slum.
