= La Leyenda Negra (film) =

La Leyenda Negra is a 2020 American coming-of-age drama that premiered at the Sundance Festival's NEXT program. It was released on December 4, 2020, on HBO. It runs 1 hour 24 minutes. The film is about an undocumented teenager who fights for her right to stay in the United States in Compton, while risking her family, her friends, and her first love. It was written and directed by Patricia Vidal Delgado, and produced by Alicia Herder and Marcel Pérez.

== Cast ==
- Monica Betancourt as Aleteia
- Kailei Lopez as Rosarito
- Irlanda Moreno as Monica
- Juan Reynoso as Aleteia's stepfather
- Sammy Flores as David
- Justin Avila as Armando

== Critical reception ==
La Leyenda Negra has received mixed reviews. It is rated 82% on Rotten Tomatoes. It has been praised for the way it was shot and the potent energy contained within it, and it has been criticized also for juggling too much subject matter. The film's title is a reference to the Black Legend, a pervasive anti-Spanish bias in history.
