= Alice Júnior =

- Theatrical release poster
- Directed by: Gil Baroni
- Written by: Luiz Bertazzo, Adriel Nizer
- Produced by: Gil Baroni, Andréa Tomeleri
- Starring: Anna Celestino Mota; Emmanuel Rosset; Surya Amitrano
- Cinematography: Renato Ogata
- Edited by: Pedro Giongo
- Release date: September 2019 (Vitória)
- Running time: 87 minutes
- Country: Brazil
- Languages: Portuguese, French

Alice Júnior is a 2019 Brazilian coming-of-age comedy-drama film about a transgender teenager's first kiss. It was directed by Gil Baroni and written by Luiz Bertazzo and Adriel Nizer. Alice, played by Anna Celestino Mota, is a 17-year-old YouTuber who moves to the countryside where she is sent to a Catholic school and bullied.
