= Rainbow Billy: The Curse of the Leviathan =

- Developer: ManaVoid Entertainment
- Publisher: Skybound Games
- Platforms: Microsoft Windows; Xbox One; PlayStation 4; Nintendo Switch
- Release: October 5, 2021
- Mode: Single-player

Rainbow Billy: The Curse of the Leviathan is a 2021 action-puzzle-platformer video game developed by ManaVoid Entertainment and published by Skybound Games. The game was released on October 5, 2021 for Microsoft Windows, Xbox One, PlayStation 4 and Nintendo Switch.

A sequel, Rainbow Billy: The Book of Fears, is scheduled to be released in 2026.

== Plot ==
Rainbow Billy, a non-binary eight-year-old, lives in the Land of Imagination, a colorful world filled with happy emotions. The Leviathan, angry at Billy's refusal to grow up, steals all the colors of the land. Billy escapes on the boat Friend-Ship with a fishing rod called Rodrigo and travels through the Land of Imagination, helping to recolor animal allies. They seek out the three orbs necessary to defeat the Leviathan and fully recolor the Land of Imagination. After gaining all three orbs, they face the Leviathan with the help of their animal friends, recoloring the Leviathan who apologises for his actions. In the real world, Billy goes to lay some flowers at their mother's grave, alongside their father who has the Leviathan tattooed on his arm.

== Gameplay ==
The game is split between open-world exploration and symbol-matching combat. The player sails between islands surrounded by dark water Each island has emotions and animal allies to collect.

The combat involves non-violent minigames which represent empathetic conversations. Each enemy has symbol-based health, and the player must select allies with the corresponding symbols in queues. The player's health is represented by morale. Once the enemy's health symbols are filled, the battle ends, with non-boss enemies joining the player's roster. Allies have skills, which are activated if they are the first in their respective queue, such as staying in the queue for an extra turn.

The game features a diverse cast of 60 animal allies, all of whom have backstories leading to developing unhealthy coping mechanisms. The player can feed them fish and give them requested items, which unlock their backstories and level them up, granting them additional symbols for battle.

== Development ==
The game was developed by Montreal, Canada-based company ManaVoid Entertainment. The game uses binaries such as black and white to symbolize diversity and inclusion. The team chose to make the protagonist Billy non-binary, despite nobody on the development team being gender-diverse, and consulted with Annie Pullen Sansfacon, a professor on transgender children and their families, to accurately portray Billy as a character.

== Reception ==
The game received mostly positive reviews according to Metacritic, and strong reviews according to OpenCritic.

The game was praised for its colorful graphics and unique combat, but was criticised for lacking consequences and oversimplifying the difficulty of mental illnesses, as well as the repetitiveness of the game's elements.
