= Unsighted =

2021 video game

- Steam version art depicting the protagonist Alma and her companion fairy bot Iris
- Developer: Studio Pixel Punk
- Publisher: Humble Games
- Platforms: Nintendo Switch; Windows; Xbox Series X/S; Xbox One; PlayStation 4
- Release: WW: September 30, 2021
- Genres: Metroidvania, adventure
- Mode: Single-player

Unsighted is a 2021 video game developed by Brazilian indie developer Studio Pixel Punk and published by Humble Games for the Nintendo Switch, Windows, Xbox Series X/S, Xbox One and PlayStation 4. The game is a Metroidvania adventure game in which players assume the role of Alma, an automaton who has amnesia in the aftermath of a war between humans and robots. In Unsighted, the player and all non-player characters have a depleting in-game time limit. When the time limit expires for characters, they become "unsighted" and disappear from the game. Players must explore the world and fight enemies to locate a finite amount of meteor dust, which allows them to choose to increase the time limit for themselves or other characters.

Unsighted is the debut game of Studio Pixel Punk, formed by Brazilian developers Fernanda Dias and Tiani Pixel in 2017. The developers cited the Metroid and The Legend of Zelda series as influential to the design of the game, and aimed to make it accessible for players and feature inclusive queer representation. Upon release, Unsighted received generally favorable reviews, with critics praising the game's innovative use of time as a narrative and gameplay mechanic, visual presentation, and combat, and critiques of some aspects of its controls, menus and platforming mechanics. In 2024, the developers announced development on a new 3D Metroidvania named Abyss X Zero.

== Gameplay ==
Combat in Unsighted contains a mixture of melee and ranged combat, and affected by weapons found throughout the game.

Unsighted is a Metroidvania in which the player character and all non-player characters have a time-limited counter and become "unsighted" on expiring, making them permanently disappear from the game. The player can expand their and other character's time by using meteor dust, an item discovered throughout the game that extends the time by 24 in-game hours. Allocation of meteor dust is limited, requiring players to become selective about which characters survive. The player can disable this feature in the game's settings by activating "Explorer Mode", which removes all time limits. The primary objective of the player is to explore the city of Arcadia to find five meteor shards, each within a separate dungeon. Navigation throughout the game world involves platforming, including jumping across gaps and platforms, and using tools collected throughout the game, including a hookshot to pull the player towards objects or enemies. As players explore the world, they unlock terminals which can allow them to save the game, access upgrades, heal and teleport to other locations. The game world is displayed on a map that reveals areas which the player has explored. The player can interact with merchants, who can exchange bolts collected throughout the game for components to craft weapons, upgrades and other items.

To defeat enemies in combat, players use one weapon in each hand, including melee and ranged weapons, and can dodge enemy attacks using a dash or parry their attack if timed correctly. Individual weapons, which include swords, guns, and axes, contain different use effects, speeds, and combos, with guns containing limited amounts of ammo. Successful attacks raise a combo meter that increases damage. All combat actions use stamina that slowly replenishes over time. Player health is regenerated using a set of syringes that restores upon the execution of successful attacks and parries. Players can use blueprints with collected or bought components to acquire potions that provide temporary buffs, or craft chips that enhance the player's attributes or provide various effects, such as increasing damage or decreasing damage taken, providing greater health points, or enhancing stamina. The game also features two co-operative multiplayer modes, including Dungeon Raid, where players complete procedurally generated dungeons to defeat enemies and survive for the longest time possible, and Boss Rush, which provides players with access to all the game's upgrades and challenges them to defeat as many of the game's bosses in a row.

== Plot ==
The player character is Alma, an experimental combat automaton that awakens with amnesia in the laboratory of her designer, Dr. Zeferina. The laboratory is situated in Arcadia, the site of a crash-landed meteor. Following the arrival of the meteor, the automatons gained sentience with access to the resource anima, and the humans fled, with the exception of Dr. Zeferina. The doctor helped the automatons, and took five shards from the meteor to study them, each protected by a powerful automaton.

Upon the return of the humans, conflict broke out, leading them to seal off the meteor beneath the Crater Tower to prevent the automatons from accessing anima. Without anima, the automatons quickly deteriorate and become unsighted, losing their self-control and becoming aggressive. Access to anima is running out, with Alma and every automaton in Arcadia having a matter of hours to survive. Faced with amnesia, Alma is tasked to retrieve shards of the meteor to build a weapon that can defeat the powerful unsighted that protect the source of the anima, whilst uncovering memories of her past, including of her missing predecessor and lover Raquel.

== Development and release ==
Unsighted is the debut game of Studio Pixel Punk, a Brazilian independent games studio founded in 2017 by designer, programmer, writer and composer Fernanda Dias and programmer, level designer and artist Tiani Pixel. The game was inspired by the dungeons and linear progression of The Legend of Zelda series and the open-ended gameplay of the Metroid series, with the game intended to evoke the familiarity of those titles whilst introducing a level of choice and freedom not normally seen in the Metroidvania genre. The game's use of a time limit in its narrative and gameplay was conceived to provide weight to the consequences behind gameplay decisions, build the player's connection to non-player characters, and encourage repeated playthroughs of the game. Dias and Pixel, both transgender women, also designed Unsighted with the intent of presenting a game that partly reflected their experiences but subverted the expected conventions of a "wholesome" game with LGBT themes. The developers sought to pursue these themes in a subtle and natural way by designing diverse characters "for people who don't always feel connected to games on a personal level". The game was developed in the Unity engine, with Ableton Live and FMOD used for audio and effects.

Following the onset of the COVID-19 pandemic, the developers reassessed the design of the game, prompting a move to a more open-ended, accessible design. The developers cited their desire to reduce the stress of the pandemic, and included features including an option to remove the game's time limits and more "relaxing side activities" to let the player "play the way they want to". The game was showcased at several independent games festivals including the 2018 Brazil's Independent Games (BIG) Festival, where it was nominated for the Best Game and Best Brazilian Game of the year. Publisher Humble Games announced Unsighted with an announcement in September 2020, followed by a trailer released for E3 in June 2021, and released on 30 September 2021 simultaneously for the Nintendo Switch, Windows, Xbox Series X/S, Xbox One and PlayStation 4. In March 2024, the developers announced work on a second project, a 3D Metroidvania game titled Abyss X Zero.

== Reception ==
Reception

Aggregate score
Aggregator	Score
Metacritic	(NS) 88/100 (PC) 84/100 (XONE) 84/100

Review scores
Publication	Score
Edge	8/10
Game Informer	9/10
GameSpot	8/10
Nintendo Life	9/10
Nintendo World Report	8.5/10
RPGFan	88/100
RPG Site	8/10

Unsighted received "generally favorable" reviews according to review aggregator website Metacritic. Several reviewers cited the game as one of the best of 2021, with Kotaku describing the game as the best Metroidvania of the year.

Many reviewers praised the game's use of time limits as an innovative gameplay and narrative mechanic. Writing for Esquire, Dom Nero discussed the emotional impact of these mechanics was "disarming" and "devastating", praising it for its ability to prompt empathy for the game's non-player characters. Several critics commented upon how they viewed the mechanic created difficult and emotionally impactful moral decisions about the survival of characters, with Edge describing the mechanic as adding a "thrilling sense of urgency" to the game. In contrast, Moises Taveras of Vice expressed a preference to play the game without the system, citing the "continuous notifications" of dying characters as "unusually cruel" and a distraction to the enjoyment of the game.

Critics were generally positive about the game's combat mechanics. Edge considered the game's hack and slash combat mechanics to be in-depth and feature a fusion of combat and platforming, citing its combo system, timed attacks and reloads, and upgrades. GameSpot praised the game's combat as "sharp" due to its balance of requiring quick reflexes and managing stamina, and describing the parry system as an effective "high-risk, high-reward" mechanic. Kotaku wrote "the hits are clunky, the parry timings are appropriately demanding, and the boss patterns are rewarding", whilst considering the game's weapon upgrade system to be insubstantial. Some reviewers experienced minor control issues, or considered the use of menus to swap weapons and tools to be inconvenient.

Reviewers highlighted the visual presentation and environmental design of the game's world. Game Informer commended the pixel art and areas as "beautiful", writing that the dungeons "boast exceptional design and plenty of variety, each with a distinct theme". Polygon described the environments as "gorgeous" and "meticulously interconnected", and highlighted its "tightly designed" dungeons that provided multiple ways to solve their puzzles. Nintendo World Report similarly wrote that the visuals were "colourful and gorgeous", and featured "plenty to explore and find".

Critics were mixed on the game's platforming sections. Game Informer described the platforming controls as "great and more fluid than expected", but found some sections to be irritating when attempting to judge distances and angles. GameSpot expressed that the art style and perspective created difficulties with "judging both distance and height, making some areas a little trickier to traverse than they should be". Nintendo Life similarly wrote that "walls and platforms don't read well in some areas".
