= List of transgender characters in television =

This is a list of live action transgender characters in television series (includes terrestrial, cable, and streaming shows). The orientation can be portrayed on-screen, described in the dialogue or mentioned. Roles include lead, main, recurring, supporting, and guest.

The names are organized in alphabetical order by the surname (i.e. last name), or by a single name if the character does not have a surname. Some naming customs write the family name first followed by the given name; in these cases, the names in the list appear under the family name (e.g. the name Jung Seo-hyun [Korean] is organized alphabetically under "J").

== List ==
Character	Portrayed by	Program	Notes	Ref(s)
Aaron	Elliot Fletcher	The Fosters	Trans man who later dates Callie. (2013-2018)	
Candy Abundance	Angelica Ross	Pose	Trans woman who is HIV-positive. (2018–2021)	
Elektra Abundance	Dominique Jackson	Pose	Trans woman who is a former shrewd house mother and reigning champion within the ballrooms, and takes on the occupation of a dominatrix in secret. (2018–2021)	
Lucinda "Lulu" Abundance	Hailie Sahar	Pose	Trans woman, also named Lucinda "Lulu" Ferocity, who is an exotic dancer based in New York City who is a member of the House of Abundance. (2018–2021)	
Unique Adams	Alex Newell	Glee	Trans woman (and first transgender character in the show) who was introduced as a shy teen boy, later becoming a vocalist, and becoming more confident as her female stage persona, Unique. By the 2013-2014 broadcast season, she had become a series regular. (2009-2015)	
Alex	Presley Alexander	This Is Us	Non-binary romantic partner of Tess. (2016–2022)	
Ana	Nava Mau	Generation	A trans woman who is attempting to be a positive role figure for her niece. (2021)	
Angelique	Jonny Beauchamp	Penny Dreadful	A mysterious transgender woman who gains Dorian's attention and becomes one of Dorian's love interests. Angelique encounters Dorian Gray in a cafe, later going to her workplace where it is made clear that she is transgender. (2014-2016)	
Anna	Valerie Landsburg	1st & Ten (1984 TV series)	Anna is a trans woman who marries the team's kicker, Zagreb Shkenusky. (1984-1991)	
Antoine	Brian Michael Smith	Queen Sugar	It's revealed that Ralph's childhood friend, Antoinette "Toine" Wilkins, was bullied for being gender-variant growing up and Ralph came to their defense. When they reunite in Season 2, Antoinette has transitioned and is a transgender man, and goes by the name of Antoine. Toine is played by transgender actor Brian Michael Smith. (2016–2022)	
Elle Argent	Yasmin Finney	Heartstopper	Yasmin Finney plays Elle, a transgender girl who was in Charlie's original friend group. She moved from the all-boys school to attend an all-girls school. It is said she was being bullied, and even suspended for her hair length. (2022-present)	
Ariel	Marina Matheus	3%	Marina Matheus plays Gloria's friend Ariel in this Brazilian show. (2016-2020)	
Miss Artiphys	Karen Dior	Xena: Warrior Princess	Trans woman in Season 2 Episode "Here She Comes... Miss Amphipolis". (1995-2001)	
Maya Avant	Karla Mosley	The Bold and the Beautiful	Trans woman who is married and has a young daughter. Maya is the first trans woman featured on a US daytime soap opera as a series regular and the first transgender bride to be married on a US daytime soap opera. (1987–Present)	
Cheryl Avery	Kate Moennig	Law & Order: Special Victims Unit	In the season 4 episode, "Fallacy," Cheryl appears, with Moening considering the show to be her initiation to New York City and said "You have to do Law and Order if you lived in New York!" (1999–Present)	
Ivan Aycock	Kelly Lynch	The L Word	Trans man who is in a relationship with Kit Porter. (2004-2009)	
Angelica Bain	Tom Fisher	Wire in the Blood	The pilot episode "The Mermaids Singing" (an adaptation of Val McDermid's 1995 book of the same name) features Angelica, a trans woman and serial killer. Angelica abducts and brutally tortures homosexual men to death.	
Matty Barton	Grace Cassidy	Emmerdale	Trans man who transitioned in his years away from the village. (Matty is the first transgender character on Emmerdale. He was formerly called Hannah Barton and left the serial in 2012, transitioning off-screen before returning in 2018. (1972–Present)	
Matty Barton	Ash Palmisciano	Emmerdale	Trans man who transitioned in his years away from the village. (Matty is the first transgender character on Emmerdale. He was formerly called Hannah Barton and left the serial in 2012, transitioning off-screen before returning in 2018. (1972–Present)	
Sheldon Beiste	Dot-Marie Jones	Glee	Trans man who transitions during the series. (2009-2015)	
Bernadette Wöller	Anton Rubtsov	Dark	Bernadette is a trans woman and prostitute who is Torben's sister. (2017-2020)	
Max Bernini	Sohan Pague	SKAM (France)	Max is a trans man and Tiffany Prigent's boyfriend.	
Erica Bettis	Helen Shaver	The Education of Max Bickford	Trans woman with a Ph.D. (2001-2002)	
Bill	Chris O'Donnell	Two and a Half Men	In the episode "An Old Flame With a New Wick" O'Donnell plays a trans man named Bill and the ex-boyfriend of Charlie Harper. (2003-2015)	
Sasha Booker	Jamie Clayton	Designated Survivor	The third season features Sasha Booker, a trans woman and the President's sister-in-law. (2016-2019)	
Hannah Bradford	Evie MacDonald	First Day	Trans girl who is entering middle school and trying to find her "authentic self." (2020)	
Brandi	Jenny McCarthy	Just Shoot Me	Brandi is a trans woman and an old college friend of Finch's as shown in the episode "There's Something About Allison." (1997-2003)	
Helen Brears	Bethany Black	Cucumber / Banana	Trans woman who dates a man and has a jealous ex-boyfriend who tries to get revenge on her. (2015)	
Charlie Briggs	Diana Weston	My Family	Diana Weston plays Charlie Briggs, an old college friend of Ben's who is trans woman. (2000-2011)	
Cotton Brown	Amiyah Scott	Star	Trans woman who is the daughter of a salon owner and part of the main cast from season 1 forward. (2016-2019)	
Denise Bryson	David Duchovny	Twin Peaks	Trans woman and FBI agent, who purportedly began presenting as a woman after working undercover. (1990-1991)	
Sophia Burset	Laverne Cox	Orange Is the New Black	Trans woman and inmate who was incarcerated at Litchfield Penitentiary. (Laverne Cox is transgender, with The Advocate suggesting that this series is the first women-in-prison series that includes an out trans woman playing the role of a transgender person. (2013-2019)	
Pat Caddison	Robert Reed	Medical Center	In the two-part Season 7 opener, Dr. Pat Caddison, a former colleague of Dr. Gannon, reveals his intention to transition from male to female. (1969-1976)	
Robert Calvert	Misia Butler	Casualty	The show featured transgender character Robert in episode 26, "Fatal Error – Part Two," of its 30th season. (2015-2016)	
Caeneus	Misia Butler	KAOS	The show features the mythological trans man Caeneus, who used to live with the Amazons until he transitioned. (2024)	
Carla	Eve Lindley	Mr. Robot	A woman who is known as 'Hot Carla' because she is a local pyromaniac in the prison and is played by a trans female actress. (2015-2019)	
Carmen	Brittany Daniel	It's Always Sunny in Philadelphia	A transgender woman who dates Mac. She later marries Nick and has a child, using Dee as a surrogate. (2005-2010)	
Blessing Chambers	Modupe Adeyeye	Hollyoaks	Trans woman who is a glass collector and works at a strip club. (1995–Present)	
Charlene	Jim Bailey	Night Court	In the Season 3 episode "Best of Friends", Dan meets up with a college buddy who is no longer living as a man but is a woman, hence a trans woman. (1984-1992)	
Cecilia Chung	Ivory Aquino	When We Rise	Trans woman who plays the real-life activist, Cecilia Chung. (2017)	
Cho Hyun-ju	Park Sung-hoon	Squid Game	Former special forces soldier and trans woman who enters the Squid Game to fund her gender-affirming surgery. (2021–2025)	
Chris	Theo Germaine	Work in Progress	Chris is a young trans man, barista, and boyfriend to the lead character. Germain appears in all episodes of the show but is credited as a special guest star. (2019–2021)	
Crystal Clark	Krista Allen	Married... with Children	In the episode "Calendar Girl," Beautiful calendar girl Crystal Clark comes out as a trans woman on national TV, to the horror of those who loved her for her body. (1987-1997)	
Cole	Tom Phelan	The Fosters	Trans man struggles with his identity and trying to be seen as a boy, both emotionally and physically speaking, and being accepted as such. (2013-2018)	
Maxine Conway	Socratis Otto	Wentworth	Trans woman who is Bea Smith's bodyguard and was dating Gary until she stabbed him. (2013–2021)	
Jason Costello	Victoria Atkin	Hollyoaks	Trans man who experienced gender dysphoria and retained an attraction to males. (1995–present)	
Hayley Cropper	Julie Hesmondhalgh	Coronation Street	Trans woman who later marries a man and is the first regular trans character to be introduced into soap opera. (1960–Present)	
David	Lukas von Horbatschewsky	Druck	Trans boy who is the love interest of the character Matteo.	
Davina	Alexandra Billings	Transparent	Trans woman who is HIV-positive. (2014-2019)	
Dax	Various actors	Star Trek: Deep Space Nine	A symbiont, has changed genders throughout their lives. (1993-1999)	
Allyson Del Lago	Jen Richards	Nashville	Trans woman and nurse who assists Juliette Barnes in the aftermath of her plane crash. (2012-2018)	
Bailey Delvecchio	Kai Shappley	The Baby-Sitters Club	Bailey is a trans girl, as learned by her babysitter, Mary Anne Spier who stands up for her with medical staff ignorant about this. (2020–2021)	
Alex Dempsey	Mae Martin	Wayward	Alex is a transgender police officer who moves to the community Tall Pines together with his wife where he attempts to help two teens escape an academy with dark secrets. (2025)	
Charlotte DiLaurentis	Vanessa Ray	Pretty Little Liars	Alison's sister and a trans woman, who tries to kill herself and her family, which GLAAD called "regrettable." (2010-2017)	
Barbara Dixon	Steve Pemberton	The League of Gentlemen	Barbara Dixon is the proprietor of the local taxi firm, Bab's Cabs. (1999-2002)	
Martin Dunbar	Matt Greenwood	Waterloo Road	A shy and stylish trans woman who appears in one episode, resulting in her being bullied by classmates, but still makes some friends. (2006-2015)	
Erica	Helen Shaver	The Education of Max Bickford	Erica is a trans woman and best friend of Max Bickford, the title character. (2001-2002)	
Angel Evangelista	Indya Moore	Pose	Trans female sex worker living near Blanca Rodriguez, a former escort, was romantically interested in Stan Bowes and later became romantically involved with Lil Papi Evangelista. (2018–2021)	
Blanca Evangelista	Mj Rodriguez	Pose	Trans woman who has HIV and is, as such, disabled. (2018–2021)	
Morgan Finn	Joanne Boland	Strange Empire	Morgan is a trans male miner in love with a married woman, Rebecca Logan. The series is set in 1869. (2014-2015)	
Frankie Fox	Hannah Alligood	Better Things	Sam's middle child, Frankie, is a transgender boy. (2016–2022)	
Wendy Garner	Sarah Buxton	CSI: Crime Scene Investigation	The fifth-season episode "Ch-ch-changes" focuses on illegal sex reassignment operations in the female transgender community, and features several transgender characters like Wendy, Mimosa, and Mona Lavelle. (2000-2015)	
Mimosa	Kate Walsh	CSI: Crime Scene Investigation	The fifth-season episode "Ch-ch-changes" focuses on illegal sex reassignment operations in the female transgender community, and features several transgender characters like Wendy, Mimosa, and Mona Lavelle. (2000-2015)	
Dr. Mona Lavelle	Lindsay Crouse	CSI: Crime Scene Investigation	The fifth-season episode "Ch-ch-changes" focuses on illegal sex reassignment operations in the female transgender community, and features several transgender characters like Wendy, Mimosa, and Mona Lavelle. (2000-2015)	
Raspy Transgender Woman	Bijoux Deluxe	CSI: Crime Scene Investigation	The fifth-season episode "Ch-ch-changes" focuses on illegal sex reassignment operations in the female transgender community, and features several transgender characters like Wendy, Mimosa, and Mona Lavelle. (2000-2015)	
Transgender Person	David Michael Fordham	CSI: Crime Scene Investigation	The fifth-season episode "Ch-ch-changes" focuses on illegal sex reassignment operations in the female transgender community, and features several transgender characters like Wendy, Mimosa, and Mona Lavelle. (2000-2015)	
Georgette	Beau Bridges	The Closer	In the episode "Make Over," Bridges plays Georgette, a transgender woman and Provenza's ex-partner. (2005-2012)	
Gittel	Hari Nef	Transparent	Trans woman living in the 1930s Germany. (2014-2019)	
Stephanie Grant	Wilson Cruz	Ally McBeal	Cruz guest stars as Stephanie Grant, a transgender teen arrested for prostitution whom Ally must defend in court. (1997-2002)	
Mackenzie Hargreaves	Georgie Stone	Neighbours	Trans woman, who is the serial's first transgender character. (1985–2025)	
Viktor Hargreeves	Elliot Page	The Umbrella Academy	Bisexual trans man. Viktor dated a man and a woman at different points in the series. He is characterized as having had many girlfriends. The revelation of his transition was announced in correspondence with Page's own public transition announcement months prior.	
Jill Hartford	Alexandra Billings	How to Get Away with Murder	Trans woman and a colleague of Annalise, a pansexual attorney, with the latter continuing to defend her friend no matter what. (2014–2020)	
Hikari Kuina	Aya Asahina	Alice In Borderland	Kuina is a transgender woman and skilled fighter. (2020–2025)	
Dolly Holloway	Maren Heary	Gypsy	She may be transgender or lesbian. (2017)	
Michael Hallowell	Ellie Desautels	Rise	Trans male music teacher. (2018)	
Ms. Hudson	Candis Cayne	Elementary	A trans woman who is an expert in Ancient Greek and makes a living as a kept woman and muse for various wealthy men and asked Sherlock Holmes for help after a relationship break-up. (2012-2019)	
Imani	Jasmine Davis	The Chi	Imani is a trans woman who has a storyline centered on a romantic relationship. (2018–Present)	
Job	Hoon Lee	Banshee	Job is a computer hacker and confidant of Lucas Hood. He has been described as transgender, a transvestite and a drag queen.(Hoon Lee believes that the character is "constantly evolving" and is not interested in "figuring out the label of who he is and every aspect of that." (2013-2016)	
Sam Jordan	Elliot Fletcher	Y: The Last Man	A trans man who proves that the main character, Yorick, is not actually "the last man left alive." (2021)	
María José	Paco León	La Casa de las Flores	Paulina's ex and the family's lawyer, a Spanish trans woman who cares a lot about her family. (2018-2020)	
Judy	Rebecca Root	Boy Meets Girl	In one episode, she reveals to her date, Leo, that she was assigned male at birth. (2015-2016)	
Gil Kessler	John Schuck	The Golden Girls	In the Season 3, episode 7, titled "Strange Bedfellows", Gil is a city council candidate who comes out as a trans man. (1985-1992)	
Kiki	Greg Campbell	Queer as Folk	Later seasons featured a minor transgender character named Kiki (usually described by other characters as "Kiki the Waitress, formerly known as Kenny the Waiter"). This included episodes such as "We Will Survive!," "Bored Out of Ya Fucking Mind" and "Big Fucking Mouth." (2000-2005)	
Kim	Damon Herriman	Secret City	An Australian drama television series in which a political journalist uncovers a secret city of interlocked conspiracies, putting innocent lives in danger including her own. Her former spouse, Kim, is a trans woman. (2016–2019)	
Kyla	Jamie Clayton	Hung	In season 3, Jamie Clayton plays Kyla, a trans woman, in two episodes in the third season in 2011. (2009-2011)	
Maura Lee Karupt	Alan Mingo Jr.	Doom Patrol	Danny is a sentient, genderqueer, teleporting street which is being haunted by the Bureau of Normalcy. Former Bureau agent Morris Wilson has become a drag queen named Maura Lee Karupt who helps keep Danny going by sustaining a party atmosphere. (2019–2023)	
Micah Lee	Leo Sheng	The L Word: Generation Q	Micah Lee and Pierce Williams are both trans men, with Lee a protagonist and Williams a secondary character. (2019–2023)	
Pierce Williams	Brian Michael Smith	The L Word: Generation Q	Micah Lee and Pierce Williams are both trans men, with Lee a protagonist and Williams a secondary character. (2019–2023)	
Denise Lockwood	Alexandra Grey	Chicago Med	Denise Lockwood is a trans woman who appears in episode 3 of season 2, and is the sister of nurse Maggie Lockwood and is portrayed by a trans actress, Alexandra Grey. She is also a recurring character. (2015–Present)	
Lola	Shakina Nayfack	Difficult People	Trans female waitress at D's Cafe who clashes with Billy Epstein, who struggles with being labeled transphobic by countering some of her controversial views, and is voiced by trans actress, Shakina Nayfack. (2015-2017)	
Louise	Jessica Crockett	Dark Angel	In Season 1, episode 8, titled "Out", Normal has a date with a woman who is actually transgender. After he finds out, he decides that he doesn't care about her past, only to discover that Louise (played by actress Jessica Crockett) is a lesbian. This was the first time a trans woman was cast to play a trans character on American television. (2000-2002)	
Louise	Fern Fitzgerald	It's a Living	In Season 3, episode 12, titled "Gender Gap", Fern Fitzgerald plays a transgender woman who dates Sonny. (1986)	
Sofia Lopez	Jonathan Del Arco	Nip/Tuck	Trans woman who had a romantic relationship with Liz. She appears in the episodes "Sofia Lopez" and "Sofia Lopez Part II." (2003-2010)	
Luna La	Zión Moreno	Gossip Girl	A trans woman who is part of the regular cast of this series. (1970-2011, 2013) (2021–2023)	
Ninete	Rogéria	Tieta	Rogéria was one of the first trans women to play a trans character in Brazil. (1989-1990)	
Zoe Luper	Jeffrey Carlson	All My Children	Trans woman who was formerly a musician named Zarf.	
Ma Hyun-yi	Lee Joo-young	Itaewon Class	Trans woman who works as the chief cook for DanBam and is saving money so she can have a sex reassignment surgery. (2020)	
Julia Martínez	Belén Cuesta	Money Heist	Julia Martínez, operating under the code name, Manila is introduced as a crew member in the Bank of Spain heist. Born as Juan Martínez, the character is portrayed as a transgender female.	
Cindy McCauliff	Lisa Edelstein	Ally McBeal	Trans woman who appears in the fourth season of the show. (1997-2002)	
Louis McGerry	Tyler Luke Cunningham	Holby City	Series 22 of the show introduced Louis McGerry, the show's first regular transgender character. Louis is a nurse at the titular hospital and the son of CEO and neurosurgeon Max McGerry. (1999–2022)	
Janet McKay	Shelley Hack	Tales from the Crypt	In the episode "The Assassin", housewife Janet McKay is revealed to once having been a CIA operative named Ronald Wald. (1989-1996)	
Anna Madrigal	Olympia Dukakis	Tales of the City	A 90-year-old trans woman who lives in San Francisco. (1993)	
Sam Malloy	Aidan Mitchell	The Riches	Sam, the youngest Malloy child, is transgender and frequently dresses in feminine clothing. The idea for Sam's non-binary gender expression came about before Izzard, a gender non-conforming comedian, joined the show. Sam's gender expression is accepted and respected by the Malloy parents and siblings. (2007-2008)	
Margo	Jen Richards	Mrs. Fletcher	Margo is the teacher for the title character's creative writing class. (2019)	
Ben Marks	Isaiah Stannard	Good Girls	Ben Marks, son of Annie and Gregg, is bullied and comes out as a transgender boy in season 2 with the name Ben. (2018–2021)	
Nico Sanjrani	Jo Vannicola	The Expanse	Nico Sanjrani is non-binary and serves as the Chief Administrator of Ceres Station. In the books, this character was originally male, but his gender was changed to non-binary in the TV adaptation. In the series, Sanjrani's pronouns in dialogue was sometimes referred to as he/him, while other times as they/them. (2015-2022)	
Nomi Marks	Jamie Clayton	Sense8	Nomi Marks is a computer hacktivist, and lesbian trans woman, living in San Francisco who finds herself mentally linked to 7 other people from around the world, and is in a relationship with Amanita Caplan. Nomi is also part of the Cluster. (2015-2018)	
Mae Martin	Mae Martin	Feel Good	Mae, a recovering addict, does not identify her sexuality. She's had relationships with men and women, and called herself transgender, non-binary, and bisexual in one episode. She is in a same-sex relationship with George, who identified as straight before she started dating Mae, and tried to have sex with a man in one episode. (2020–2021)	
Jazmin Martinez	Hailie Sahar	Good Trouble	Trans woman and sister of Gael. (2019–2024)	
Matthew	Garcia	Party of Five (2020)	Matthew is Lucia's undocumented trans friend who works at the Acostas' restaurant. (2020)	
Maxine	Callum Booth-Ford	Butterfly	Three-part miniseries starring Anna Friel and 11-year old Callum Booth-Ford as her daughter Max(ine). (2018)	
Alexis Meade	Rebecca Romijn	Ugly Betty	Trans woman who returned from the dead as a ruthless yet emotionally complex woman. (Initially portrayed by Elizabeth Penn Payne for the first twelve episodes, when she was listed in the credits as "Masked Lady". She was later written off the show. The character was controversial for being played by cisgender actress Rebecca Romijn. According to Romijn, casting a cisgender actress was the only way to get network approval for a trans character. Romijn puts it, “I never would be cast in that role today, but I feel it helped open doors for the trans community. I'd like to think that, anyway. I don't want to pat myself on the back too much.” (2006-2010)	
Molly Milkovich	—	Shameless (US)	Half sister of Mandy, who was assigned male at birth and raised as a girl. (2011–2021)	
Paul Millander	Matt O'Toole	CSI: Crime Scene Investigation	A serial killer who posed as a judge, and serves as Gil Grissom's nemesis, he is featured in multiple episodes. It is later shown that he underwent sexual reassignment in his youth and as a result his relationship with his mother was a complicated one, with him leading a double life, one as Paul Millander and the other as the "Honorable Judge Douglas Mason." (2000-2015)	
Mo	Alex Newell	Zoey's Extraordinary Playlist	Gender nonconforming, continued to dress as male when at church but later showed "true self"; character created as bisexual woman but changed to reflect Newell's life. (2020–2021)	
Ava Moore	Famke Janssen	Nip/Tuck	Trans woman, with GLAAD criticizing the character as problematic because of her "psychotic and incestuous behavior." (2003-2010)	
Linda Murkland	Linda Gray	All That Glitters	Linda is a transgender fashion model, who is said to be the first transgender series regular on American television. (1977) (2015–2021)	
Nia Nal / Dreamer	Nicole Maines	Supergirl	Trans woman, said to be the first onscreen transgender superhero. She works at CatCO (introduced in Season 4).	
Nicki	Lale Andrä	Die Pfefferkörner	Trans girl in the 2017 episode "Weil ich ein Mädchen bin" who is blackmailed by other students. The episode was nominated for the International Emmy Kids Award.	
Noah	Elliot Fletcher	Faking It	Gay trans man. (2014-2016)	
Cassandra O'Brien	Zoë Wanamaker	Doctor Who	Trans woman and villain in the series. (In one review, she was described as an "incidental parody of transgender womanhood," and a "fractured mirror-image of medical transition itself," even as she is "problematic." (1963–Present)	
Orlando	Matty Cardarople	A Series of Unfortunate Events	A non-binary character and part of Count Olaf's acting troupe. Also known as: The Henchperson of Indeterminate Gender. (2017–2019)	
Casey Parker	Alex Blue Davis	Grey's Anatomy	Trans man and war veteran (introduced as a first-year surgical intern in Season 14). (2005–present)	
Arun Parmar	Rebecca Hazlewood	Bad Girls	Trans woman and an inmate, she is also hinted to be bisexual as she served time in Larkhall prison. (1999-2006)	
Cherry Peck	Willam Belli	Nip/Tuck	Trans woman who works at a bar, who is later brutally attacked by another character. (2003-2010)	
Pei	Kayla Blake	China Beach	Pei is a Filipino trans woman who entertains the American troops in Vietnam. (Season 3, Episode 8) (1989)	
JJ Perry	Blue Chapman	Council of Dads	JJ is Scott and Robin's seven-year-old transgender son, who was assigned female at birth. (Season 1, Episodes 1-10) (2020)	
Maura Pfefferman	Jeffrey Tambor	Transparent	Trans woman who comes out to her family late in life. She is prevented from transitioning due to her health problems. (2014-2019)	
Caitlyn "Harper" Poythress	Jordan Kristine Seamón	We Are Who We Are	A drama set on an Italian army base exploring the lives of the characters there, particularly Caitlin and Fraser played by Jack Dylan Grazer. During the course of the series, Caitlyn explores her gender, presenting first as a cross-dressing girl but near the end is learning toward trans man, adopting the name Harper at least tentatively. It's a coming of age story of the teenagers who live there and while the trans storyline is not the main one, it intertwines. (2020)	
Rosie Preston	Miya Ocego	Wreck	Rosie is trans.	
Theo Putnam	Lachlan Watson	Chilling Adventures of Sabrina	Trans man. In season 1, Theo was known as Susie Putnam and described as non-binary. He is Sabrina's close friend at Baxter High and later transitions, affirming his identity as a trans boy. (2018–2020)	
Carmelita Rainer	Candis Cayne	Dirty Sexy Money	A trans woman and recurring character in this series romantically involved with the New York District Attorney, General Patrick Darling. She later left the series after another character accidentally shot and killed her. (2008-2009)	
Alba Recio	Eduardo Espinilla (season 1)	La que se avecina	Alba is the daughter of the homophobic Antonio Recio, who is embarrassed by her, and is a main character after season nine. (2007–Present)	
Alba Recio	Sergi Ruíz (seasons 2 and 3)	La que se avecina	Alba is the daughter of the homophobic Antonio Recio, who is embarrassed by her, and is a main character after season nine. (2007–Present)	
Alba Recio	Víctor Palmero (season 8 onward)	La que se avecina	Alba is the daughter of the homophobic Antonio Recio, who is embarrassed by her, and is a main character after season nine. (2007–Present)	
Drew Reeves	Zelda Williams	Dead Of Summer	Trans man who is gay or possibly bisexual, and ends up in a relationship with another man. (2016)	
Raymond Reddington	James Spader	The Blacklist	After eight seasons with several leads spread around obscure and ambiguous dialogues, with some episodes themed around transexuality and even a female character with a male name ('Mr Kaplan'), the true identity of the notorious criminal, and main character, Raymond Reddington, is revealed to be of Katerina Rostova, a famous soviet agent. In one episode from the sixth season, Reddington even explains, to his daughter, that he was a complex child, not like the other children, and that his father did not accept him for what he his, thus suggesting that the sex change may not have been solely to hide Katerina's identity from her pursuers, but also rooted in sexual ambiguity.	
Vera Reynolds	Peter Capaldi	Prime Suspect	Vera is a trans woman and cabaret singer in Season 3. (1991-2006) (2018-2020)	
María José Riquelme	Paulina de la Mora	The House of Flowers	Trans woman who was married to Paulina before transitioning. She remarried Paulina in the final episode of season 3 (3x11).	
Rosalind	V. Vieux	Station 19	Trans woman who is Ben Warren's sister, previously on Grey's Anatomy, and a recurring character. (2018–2024)	
Miss Robyn Ross	Carlotta	Number 96	In this series, Carlotta played a showgirl revealed to be transgender. She is the first trans actress to play a trans character on Television. (1972-1977)	
Óscar Ruiz	Ana Polvorosa	Las Chicas Del Cable	Óscar Ruiz is a transgender man navigating his identity in 1930s Spain while facing societal challenges and finding love with Carlota Senillosa.	
Naomi Russell	Bel Priestley	Heartstopper	Bel Priestley plays Naomi Russell, a trans girl that Elle meets at an Open House for an art school they both strive to attend. (2022-present)	
Ruthie	Patti Harrison	Shrill	An irreverent co-worker and an office assistant who is transgender. (2019–2021)	
Toni Rykener	Dana Aliya Levinson	American Gods	A trans woman, hostess of The Grand Peacock Inn, who is a demigoddess and protector of queer love. (S3.E8, 2021)	
Tony Sawicki	Tatiana Maslany	Orphan Black	Trans man who is a clone and criminal introduced in season two, with every other known clone in his "batch" as a female. (2013-2017)	
Shea	Trace Lysette	Transparent	A HIV-positive recurring character and trans woman. (2014-2019)	
Simone	Eve Lindley	Dispatches From Elsewhere	Trans woman character, main cast. (2020)	
David Schreibner	Lukas von Horbatschewsky	Druck (SKAM Germany)	David is a trans man and Matteo Florenzi's boyfriend.	
Kyle Slater	Riley Carter Millington	EastEnders	Kyle appeared in the serial between 2015 and 2016, and is a trans man. (1985–Present)	
Julia Smith	Melissa Leo	Veronica Mars	A trans woman who helps a classmate find his father. (2004-2019)	
Sally St. Claire	Annie Wallace	Hollyoaks	Trans woman who initially keeps her transgender status a secret because of negative past experiences but later comes out. (1995–Present)	
Stat	Patti Harrison	Q-Force	Trans lesbian hacker criminal, one of the main four characters in Q-Force.	
Reverend Michael Stills	Dallas Malloy	Eli Stone	In the season two episode, "Two Ministers," Michael is a trans minister who needs legal help when he loses his job after transitioning. (2008-2009)	
Edith "Edie" Stokes	Veronica Redd	The Jeffersons	Edie is George's old army buddy as shown in the Season 4 episode "Once a Friend" and is a trans woman. (1975-1985)	
Paul Strickland	Brian Michael Smith	9-1-1: Lone Star	A black trans man who is one of the fire fighters at Station 126. (2020–2025)	
Sü	Nyla Rose	The Switch	The series, the first transgender-themed television series produced in Canada, stars Nyla Rose as Sü, an IT manager who comes out as a trans woman, and is forced to rebuild her life after losing her job and her apartment as a result of her announcement. (2016)	
Max Sweeney	Daniel Sea	The L Word	Bisexual trans man who struggled to figure out his identity, taking this identity "into the working and dating worlds." (2004-2009)	
Jesse Sweetland	Sadie O'Neil	Bellevue	Teenage trans man killed by a detective after various community members attempted to shame him for his trans identity. (2017)	
Gray Tal	Ian Alexander	Star Trek: Discovery	A trans man, and orphan, who joined Trill living aboard a generational starship with his Human partner Adira. (2017–2024)	
Adira Tal	Blu Del Barrio	Star Trek: Discovery	A non-binary human, joined with the Tal symbiont who lived aboard a generational ship with their boyfriend Gray. They later became a member of Starfleet. (2017–2024)	
Elizabeth "Liz" Taylor	Denis O'Hare	American Horror Story: Hotel	Trans female bartender who knows all sorts of secrets and works in the Blue Parrot Lounge at the Hotel Cortez. (2015-2016)	
Thad	Drew Pillsbury	Married... with Children	In season 9's tenth episode, "Dud Bowl", Thad, a former high school teammate of Al, is now a trans woman, to Al's dismay. Nevertheless, she plays football on Al's re-organized team. (1987-1997)	
Adam Torres	Jordan Todosey	Degrassi: The Next Generation	Trans man, the "only transgender regular or recurring character on scripted television" in 2011, according to GLAAD. (2001-2015)	
Tracie/Simon	Sean Bean	Accused	Simon is an English teacher who has a female alter-ego named Tracie. He has been described as transgender and a transvestite. (2010–2012)	
Trevor	Elliot Fletcher	Shameless (US)	Gay trans man who works at a local LGBT center and was the love interest for Ian Gallagher. (2011–2021)	
Jules Vaughn	Hunter Schafer	Euphoria	Jules is a trans woman who just moved into town. She is new in school, where she meets Rue, a drug addict who just got out of rehab. They eventually become close friends, and fall in love. (2019–Present)	
Venus Van Dam	Walton Goggins	Sons of Anarchy	Venus Van Dam, born Vincent Noone, was introduced into the series as a transgender prostitute. She was an ally of the motorcycle club and develops a romantic relationship with Tig Trager.	
Vera	Lilith Primavera	The Ignorant Angels	A transgender who is befriended with Michele.	
Buck Vu	Ian Alexander	The OA	An Asian trans male teen. (2016–2019)	
Whiterose	B. D. Wong	Mr. Robot	Trans woman who is the leader of a hacking collective, the Dark Army. (2015-2019)	
Cameron Wirth	Laverne Cox	Doubt	Ivy League-educated attorney, mentor, and trans woman. (2017)	
Marci Wise	Isis King	When They See Us	A young trans woman who is Korey's sister. (2019)	
Transgender Woman	Kenneth Kynt Bryan	NCIS: New Orleans	In the Season 6 episode, "Judgement Call," Bryan voices a character titled "Transgender Woman," but was uncredited for the performance in the episode. (2014–2021)	
Ysela	Daniela Vega	Tales of the City	Trans woman. She became Anna Madrigal's first friend when Anna moved to San Francisco. (2019)	

== See also ==
- List of feature films with transgender characters
- List of lesbian characters in television
- List of gay characters in television
- List of bisexual characters in television
- List of comedy television series with LGBT characters
- List of dramatic television series with LGBT characters: 1960s–2000s
- List of dramatic television series with LGBT characters: 2010–2015
- List of dramatic television series with LGBT characters: 2016–2019
- List of dramatic television series with LGBT characters: 2020s
- List of LGBT characters in radio and podcasts
- List of LGBT characters in soap operas
- Lists of American television episodes with LGBT themes
- List of fictional intersex characters
