= Jussim =

Jussim is a surname. Notable people with the surname include:

- Jared Jussim (born 1935), American lawyer
- Lee Jussim (born 1955), American social psychologist
