= Sorgi =

Sorgi is a surname. Notable people with the surname include:

- Erica Sorgi (born 1982), American diver
- Jim Sorgi (born 1980), American football player
- João Pedro Sorgi (born 1993), Brazilian tennis player
- Marcello Sorgi (born 1955), Italian journalist and author
