= Jerry Maguire =

1996 American film by Cameron Crowe

- Theatrical release poster
- Directed by: Cameron Crowe
- Written by: Cameron Crowe
- Based on: Leigh Steinberg
- Produced by: James L. Brooks; Richard Sakai; Laurence Mark; Cameron Crowe
- Starring: Tom Cruise; Cuba Gooding Jr.; Renée Zellweger; Kelly Preston; Jerry O'Connell; Jay Mohr; Bonnie Hunt
- Cinematography: Janusz Kamiński
- Edited by: Joe Hutshing
- Music by: Nancy Wilson
- Production companies: TriStar Pictures; Gracie Films; Vinyl Films
- Distributed by: Sony Pictures Releasing
- Release date: December 13, 1996; (United States)
- Running time: 138 minutes
- Country: United States
- Language: English
- Budget: $50 million
- Box office: $273.6 million

Jerry Maguire is a 1996 American sports romantic comedy-drama film directed and written by Cameron Crowe. It was produced by Crowe and James L. Brooks, respectively for Vinyl Films and Gracie Films and distributed by Sony Pictures Releasing under the TriStar Pictures label. It stars Tom Cruise as the title character, alongside Cuba Gooding Jr., Renée Zellweger, Kelly Preston, Jerry O'Connell, Jay Mohr, Bonnie Hunt and Regina King. It was released in North American theaters on December 13, 1996.

Jerry Maguire was inspired by an experience involving sports agent Leigh Steinberg, a technical consultant for the film, and his client, Tim McDonald (who makes a cameo appearance in this film), during the 1993 NFL season when free agency was introduced. The film was also partly inspired by a 28-page memo written at Disney in 1991 by Jeffrey Katzenberg.

Jerry Maguire received positive reviews for its performances and screenplay. It grossed more than $273 million worldwide against its $50 million budget. It was the ninth-highest-grossing film of 1996. It was nominated for five Academy Awards, including Best Picture and Best Actor for Cruise, with Cuba Gooding Jr. winning Best Supporting Actor, in addition to the Screen Actors Guild Award in the same category. Cruise won the Golden Globe Award for Best Actor in a Motion Picture – Musical or Comedy.

Jerry Maguire gained a cult following and has spawned several catchphrases into popular culture, such as "You had me at 'hello'", "You complete me" and "Show me the money".

== Plot ==
Jerry Maguire is a slick 35-year-old sports agent working for Sports Management International (SMI).

He's confident, successful, studded with clients, and has little interest in anything except his comission.

But following criticism from an injured player's son, Jerry has an epiphany concerning his career, which leads him to write a mission statement about dishonesty in the business as well as his desire to work with fewer clients, and make less money.

In response, SMI management sends Bob Sugar, Jerry's protégé, to fire him. This sends both men racing to call Jerry's clients, with Sugar pulling every trick in the book to steal them.

Jerry speaks to Arizona Cardinals wide receiver Rod Tidwell, a smaller client who is unhappy with the amount of money being paid him. Rod tests Jerry's resolve through a long tirade on his lack of contract extension. By the end of the conversation, Jerry has held on to Rod Tidwell, but lost all his other clients to Sugar.

Leaving the office, Jerry -fighting a breakdown- announces that he will start his own company, and asks who's coming with him. A question which everyone ignores with the exception of 26-year-old Dorothy Boyd, a single mother who boldly follows him out, quitting her job then and there.

Frank "Cush" Cushman, a superstar quarterback prospect who is expected to be the number one NFL draft pick, initially says he will also stay with Jerry after he makes a personal visit to the Cushman home.

Frank's father insists on a handshake deal based on his word which is "stronger than oak" instead of a signed contract, and Jerry is -for the briefest of moments- basking in glory.

But on the night before the draft, he finds out that Frank and his father have been wooed into signing with Bob Sugar while Jerry is caught up with introducing Rod to other football executives.

Losing Cushman shatters Jerry's self-confidence, and he begins to drink heavily. Bemoaning his fate to Tidwell who isn't having it.

Jerry breaks up with his upper crust fiancée Avery Bishop after she becomes emotionally unsupportive. In retaliation she punches him repeatedly, knocking him to the floor and calling him a loser.

He then turns to Dorothy, becoming closer to her young son Ray, and eventually starts a romantic relationship with her.

Jerry focuses all his energy on Rod, now his only remaining client, who is difficult to keep happy. In need of money, Jerry calls in a favor to get a contract extension from Rod's current team, the Cardinals, but receives a lowball offer. Rod and his wife, wanting to support their family, decide to reject a $1.4 million dollar deal. While playing out Rod's existing contract. Jerry warns them that if Rod gets injured, he gets zero.

Without any money coming in, Dorothy knows that Jerry cannot afford payroll, so she decides to move to San Diego for a more secure job offer with health benefits. Afraid of losing Dorothy, Jerry proposes marriage to share health benefits and, as she is smitten, she agrees.

Over the next several months, Rod and Jerry grow closer through a series of open and difficult conversations as they struggle to secure him a contract. Rod tells Jerry that he wants him to be honest, while Jerry tells Rod, "Help me, help you," convincing him to stop complaining and start playing with his heart. Rod takes Jerry's advice, playing well and advancing the Cardinals.

Jerry's marriage to Dorothy falters, as he never really wanted to marry her to begin with. She, finally sensing this, suggests they separate.

During a Christmas Day Monday Night Football game between the Cardinals and the Dallas Cowboys, Rod catches a winning touchdown that secures the playoffs for the Cardinals, but appears to receive a serious injury. After a few minutes, he regains consciousness and celebrates with a dance for the cheering crowd. After the scare and the widely televised recovery, Jerry and Rod embrace in front of the media and show how their relationship has progressed from strictly business to a friendship, which was a point Jerry made in his mission statement.

Triggering a realization, Jerry immediately flies home, finding Dorothy in a meeting of her sister Laurel's divorcee support group. The group watches as Jerry gives an impassioned speech telling Dorothy he needs her, to which she responds, "Shut up… you had me at hello."

Rod appears on the show Up Close, where he learns that Jerry has secured him a massive $11.2 million contract with the Cardinals, allowing him to finish his career in Arizona.

Rod, who moments before said "I'm not going to cry Roy!" breaks down and thanks everyone, extending warm gratitude to Jerry. Jerry and Dorothy celebrate as Jerry is introduced to other pro athletes who have seen his work with Rod. Jerry and Dorothy walk with Ray, discussing Ray's future as a baseball player after noticing his strong throw.

== Cast ==
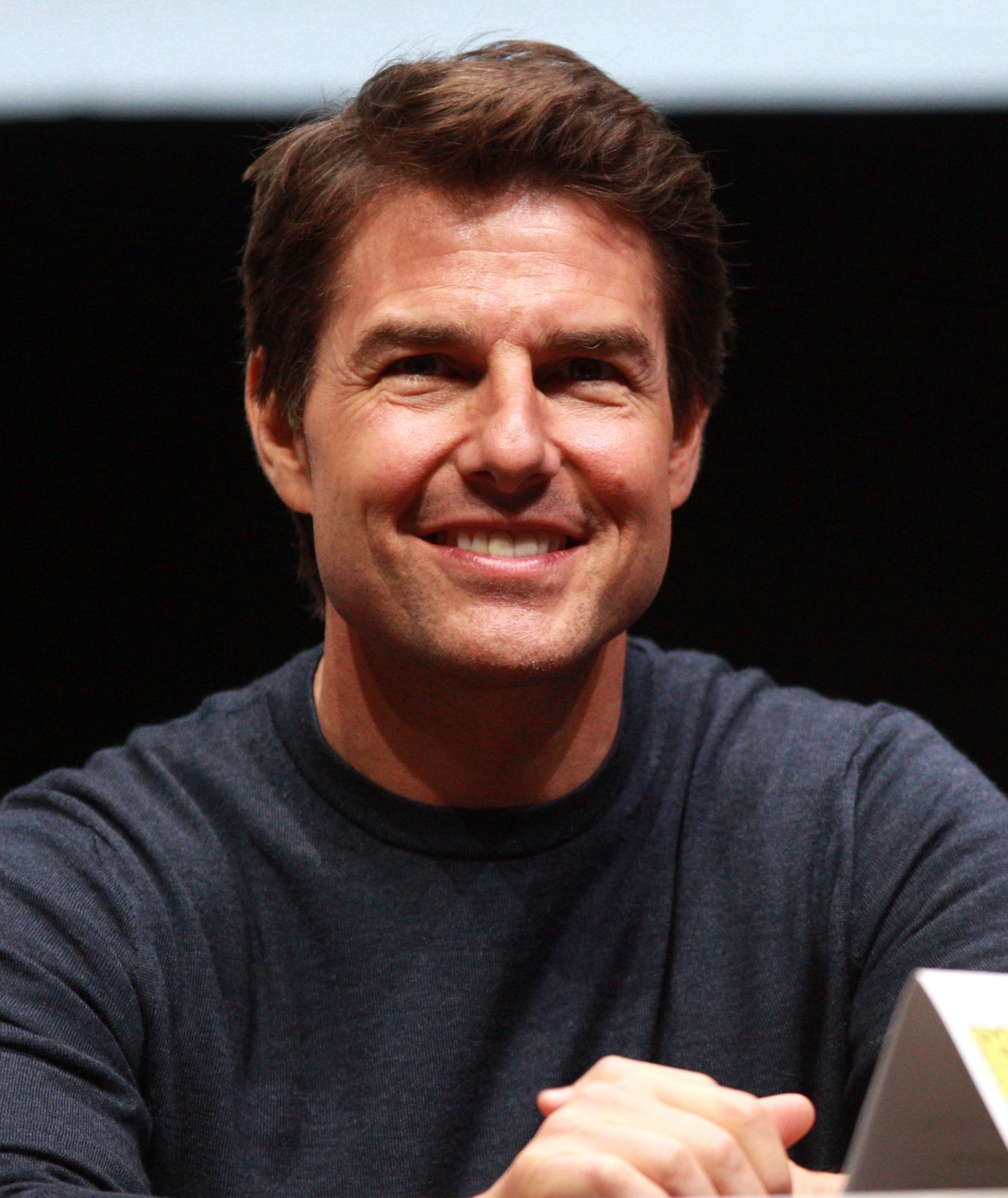
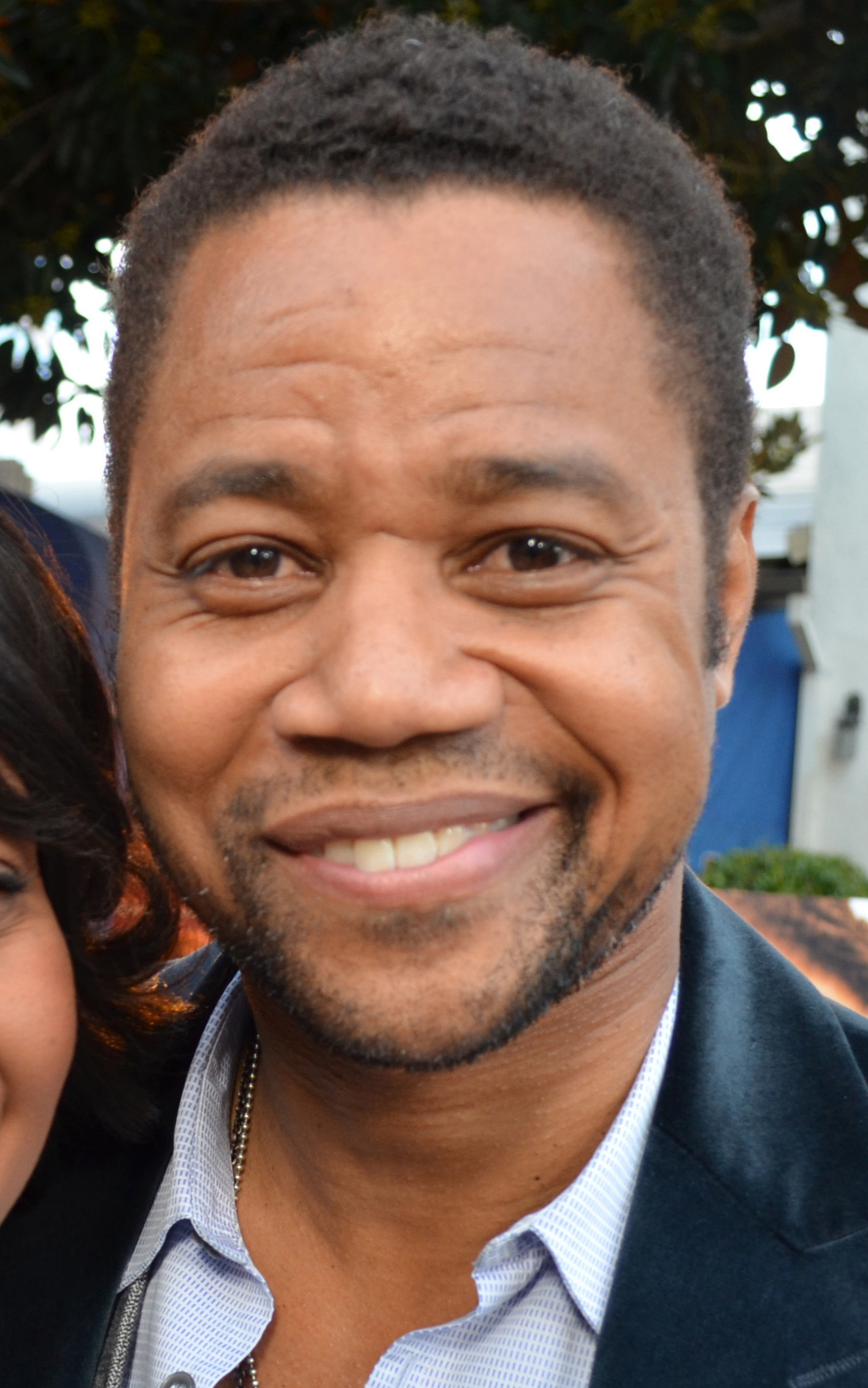
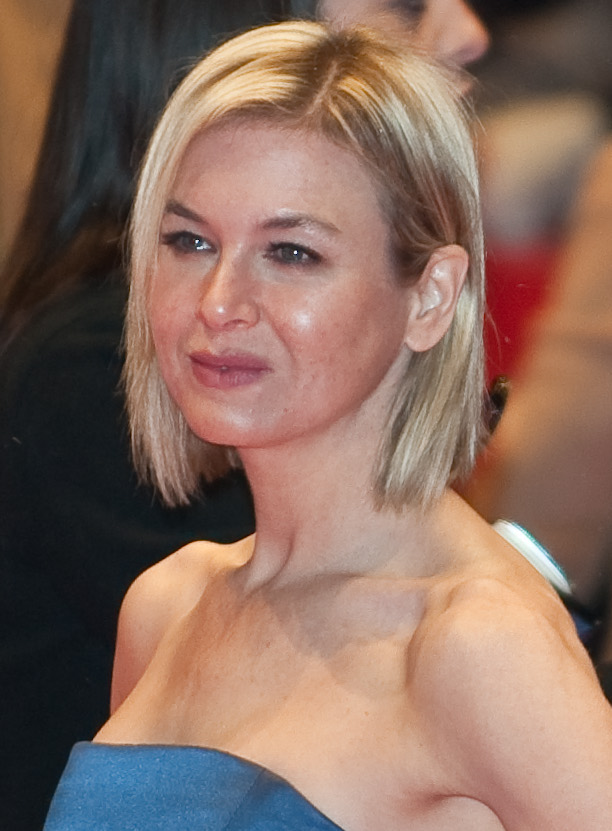
Tom Cruise (left: pictured in 2013), Cuba Gooding Jr. (2012) and Renée Zellweger (right: pictured in 2010)
- Tom Cruise as Jerry Maguire
- Cuba Gooding Jr. as Rod Tidwell
- Renée Zellweger as Dorothy Boyd
- Kelly Preston as Avery Bishop
- Jerry O'Connell as Frank "Cush" Cushman
- Jay Mohr as Bob Sugar
- Bonnie Hunt as Laurel Boyd
- Jay Ward as Tom Brand
- Regina King as Marcee Tidwell
- Jonathan Lipnicki as Ray Boyd
- Todd Louiso as Chad the Nanny
- Jeremy Suarez as Tyson Tidwell
- Jared Jussim as Dicky Fox
- Jann Wenner as Scully
- Josh Peck as Joe Maguire
- Ali Wentworth as Bobbi Fallon
- Aries Spears as Teepee Tidwell
- Kelly Coffield as Jan
- Winnie Holzman and Hynden Walch as members of the women's group
- Glenn Frey as Dennis Wilburn
- Donal Logue as Rick (Junior Agent)
- Tom Gallop as Ben
- Angela Goethals as Kathy Sanders
- Rick Johnson as John Swenson
- Jerry Cantrell as Jesus of CopyMat
- Toby Huss as Steve Remo
- Drake Bell as Jesse Remo
- Christine Cavanaugh as Mrs. Remo
- Eric Stoltz as Ethan Valhere
- Brent Barry as Calvin Nack
- Theo Greenly as Hootie Fan
- Jerry Ziesmer as Trainer
- Anthony Natale as Elevator Couple
- Reagan Gomez-Preston as Tidwell's Cousin
- Lucy Liu, Justina Vail Evans, Samantha Smith, Ivana Miličević, Lisa Stahl, Emily Procter, Stacey Williams, Lisa Ann Hadley, Alison Armitage and Rebecca Rigg as Former Girlfriends
- Beau Bridges as Matt Cushman (uncredited)

As themselves:

- Roy Firestone
- Al Michaels
- Dan Dierdorf
- Frank Gifford
- Mel Kiper Jr.
- Jeffrey Lurie
- Drew Rosenhaus
- Rich Kotite
- Tim McDonald
- Mike Tirico
- Wayne Fontes
- Mike White
- Johnnie Morton
- Rick Mirer
- Drew Bledsoe
- Rob Moore
- Ki-Jana Carter
- Herman Moore
- Art Monk
- Troy Aikman
- Katarina Witt
- Dean Biasucci
- Warren Moon
- Kerry Collins
- Erica Sorgi
- Dallas Malloy
- Jim Irsay
- Barry Switzer (uncredited)

== Production ==
Based on the success of Cameron Crowe's previous films Say Anything... (1989), Singles (1992), and writing Fast Times at Ridgemont High (1982), Crowe got a deal from Sony Pictures under the TriStar Pictures label. Crowe wrote the film based on Leigh Steinberg, an American sports agent who supported Tim McDonald during the 1993 NFL seasons.

Crowe wrote the screenplay for Tom Hanks. But Crowe took so long to write the screenplay that by the time the film was ready to be made, Hanks turned down the role as he was more interested in directing That Thing You Do!. Woody Harrelson was offered the role but turned it down. Rod Tidwell was partially modeled after Charley Taylor.

Janet Jackson auditioned and was initially accepted for the role of Marcee Tidwell, though it later went to Regina King, who previously co-starred in Jackson's debut film Poetic Justice. Jackson is referenced twice in the film, with a Janet poster seen hanging in Teepee's room and Cuba Gooding Jr.'s character Rod Tidwell asking "What Have You Done for Me Lately?", paying homage to Jackson's hit of the same name. Artie Lange filmed a scene but it was cut.

Patricia Arquette, Kate Beckinsale, Bridget Fonda, Winona Ryder, Marisa Tomei, Cameron Diaz, Gwyneth Paltrow, Uma Thurman and Jennifer Lopez were all considered for the part of Dorothy. Mira Sorvino was also considered for Dorothy but the producers would not meet her quote. The producers also considered Janeane Garofalo for the role of Dorothy but she was deemed too old for the part. Connie Britton auditioned for the role of Dorothy, and the choice was narrowed down to Zellweger and Britton, with Zellweger winning the part. Damon Wayans and Mykelti Williamson were considered for the role of Rod Tidwell. Jamie Foxx auditioned for the role of Rod Tidwell. Diane Lane was considered for the role of Avery Bishop; however, the role was eventually given to Kelly Preston. Billy Wilder was considered for the part of Jerry's mentor Dicky Fox.

=== Product placement ===
TriStar received merchandise and marketing services of over $1.5 million from Reebok in exchange for incorporating a commercial into the film and depicting the Reebok brand within certain agreed-upon standards; when the film was theatrically released, the commercial had been left out and a tirade including "broadsides against Reebok" was included. When the film aired on television, the Reebok commercial had been embedded into the film as originally agreed upon. The "Special Edition" DVD release of the film, which has the film's theatrical edit, includes the commercial as bonus content.

== Soundtrack ==
Jerry Maguire was scored by Crowe's then-wife, Nancy Wilson, a member of the rock band Heart. The songwriter Aimee Mann recorded a song, "Wise Up", for the film, but Crowe felt it did not fit. According to Crowe, he had used Mann's original version, a simple demo piano, in a scene in which Jerry Maguire is moving through an airport. Mann's final version was "larger, more lush, more of a personal epic, and quite incredible... suddenly it was too big for the scene it was meant for." He said not being able to use it was "heartbreaking". Though it was not used in the film, "Wise Up" was included on the Jerry Maguire soundtrack album and later used in the 1999 film Magnolia.

"Secret Garden", originally a Bruce Springsteen track from 1995, was re-released in 1997 after its exposure in the film and on the soundtrack, and reached No. 19 on the Billboard Hot 100.

== Release ==
=== Box office ===
Jerry Maguire debuted at number one above Mars Attacks! and 101 Dalmatians, earning $17,084,296 during its opening weekend. The film would earn the second-highest December opening weekend at the time of its release, behind Star Trek VI: The Undiscovered Country. While it was overtaken by Beavis and Butt-Head Do America in its second weekend, it still collected $13.1 million, outgrossing newcomers Scream and One Fine Day in the process. It eventually grossed $153,952,592 in North American box office and approximately $119.6 million internationally for a $273,552,592 worldwide total, on a budget of $50 million. It was the ninth top-grossing film of 1996 and the fourth highest-grossing romantic drama film of all time.

=== Critical response ===
On the review aggregator website Rotten Tomatoes, 86% of 153 critics' reviews are positive. The website's consensus reads: "Anchored by dazzling performances from Tom Cruise, Cuba Gooding Jr., and Renée Zellweger, as well as Cameron Crowe's tender direction, Jerry Maguire meshes romance and sports with panache." Metacritic, which uses a weighted average, assigned the film a score of 77 out of 100, based on 28 critics, indicating "generally favorable" reviews. Audiences polled by CinemaScore gave the film an average grade of "A" on an A+ to F scale.

Cuba Gooding Jr. won an Academy Award for Best Supporting Actor for his portrayal of Rod Tidwell, the Arizona Cardinals football player who sticks with Maguire. Cruise was also nominated for Best Actor in a Leading Role and the movie marked Renée Zellweger's breakout role. The film was nominated for Best Picture, and crew members on the film were nominated for Best Original Screenplay and Best Film Editing awards.

Roger Ebert of the Chicago Sun-Times gave the film three out of four stars, writing that there "are so many subplots that Jerry Maguire seems too full" and also commented that the film "starts out looking cynical and quickly becomes a heartwarmer." Todd McCarthy of Variety wrote "An exceptionally tasty contempo comedic romance, Jerry Maguire runs an unusual pattern on its way to scoring an unexpected number of emotional, social and entertaining points. Smartly written and boasting a sensational cast, Cameron Crowe's shrewdly observed third feature also gives Tom Cruise one of his very best roles..." In a four out of four review, Graham Young of Birmingham Mail explained that "the Mission: Impossible star earns his own spurs by appearing in virtually every scene, carrying the picture almost single-handedly like only the truly big stars can." John Lyttle of The Independent said, "What makes Jerry Maguire a messy, and therefore a genuinely modern romantic comedy -- what gives it a swoon appeal missing from the genre since When Harry Met Sally -- is that Cruise is finally forced to move forward."

Former Green Bay Packers vice president Andrew Brandt said that the film "accurately portrayed the cutthroat nature of the agent business, especially the lengths to which agents will go to retain or pilfer clients. It also captured the financial, emotional and psychological investment that goes far beyond negotiating contracts."

=== Accolades ===
Association	Category	Recipient	Result
Academy Awards	Best Picture	James L. Brooks, Cameron Crowe, Laurence Mark and Richard Sakai	Nominated
Academy Awards	Best Actor	Tom Cruise	Nominated
Academy Awards	Best Supporting Actor	Cuba Gooding Jr.	Won
Academy Awards	Best Screenplay – Written Directly for the Screen	Cameron Crowe	Nominated
Academy Awards	Best Film Editing	Joe Hutshing	Nominated
American Comedy Awards	Funniest Supporting Actor in a Motion Picture	Cuba Gooding Jr.	Won
ASCAP Film and Television Music Awards	Top Box Office Films	Nancy Wilson	Won
Awards Circuit Community Awards	Best Motion Picture	James L. Brooks, Cameron Crowe, Laurence Mark and Richard Sakai	Nominated
Awards Circuit Community Awards	Best Director	Cameron Crowe	Nominated
Awards Circuit Community Awards	Best Actor in a Leading Role	Tom Cruise	Nominated
Awards Circuit Community Awards	Best Actor in a Supporting Role	Cuba Gooding Jr.	Nominated
Awards Circuit Community Awards	Best Actress in a Supporting Role	Renée Zellweger	Nominated
Awards Circuit Community Awards	Best Original Screenplay	Cameron Crowe	Nominated
Awards Circuit Community Awards	Best Film Editing	Joe Hutshing	Nominated
Blockbuster Entertainment Awards	Favorite Actor – Comedy/Romance	Tom Cruise	Won
Blockbuster Entertainment Awards	Favorite Supporting Actor – Comedy/Romance	Cuba Gooding Jr.	Won
Blockbuster Entertainment Awards	Favorite Supporting Actress – Comedy/Romance	Renée Zellweger	Won
Chicago Film Critics Association Awards	Best Supporting Actor	Cuba Gooding Jr.	Won
Chicago Film Critics Association Awards	Most Promising Actress	Renée Zellweger	Nominated
Critics Choice Awards	Best Picture		Nominated
Critics Choice Awards	Best Actor	Tom Cruise	Nominated
Critics Choice Awards	Best Supporting Actor	Cuba Gooding Jr.	Won
Critics Choice Awards	Best Child Performance	Jonathan Lipnicki	Won
Critics Choice Awards	Breakthrough Artist	Renée Zellweger	Won
Dallas-Fort Worth Film Critics Association Awards	Best Picture		Nominated
Dallas-Fort Worth Film Critics Association Awards	Best Supporting Actor	Cuba Gooding Jr.	Won
Directors Guild of America Awards	Outstanding Directorial Achievement in Motion Pictures	Cameron Crowe	Nominated
Empire Awards	Best Director	Cameron Crowe	Won
European Film Awards	Screen International Award	Cameron Crowe	Nominated
Florida Film Critics Circle Awards	Best Actor	Tom Cruise	Runner-up
Golden Globe Awards	Best Motion Picture – Musical or Comedy		Nominated
Golden Globe Awards	Best Actor in a Motion Picture – Musical or Comedy	Tom Cruise	Won (returned)
Golden Globe Awards	Best Supporting Actor – Motion Picture	Cuba Gooding Jr.	Nominated
Hochi Film Awards	Best Foreign Language Film	Cameron Crowe	Won
Humanitas Prize Awards	Feature Film	Cameron Crowe	Nominated
Motion Picture Sound Editors Awards	Best Sound Editing – ADR		Won
MTV Movie Awards	Best Movie		Nominated
MTV Movie Awards	Best Male Performance	Tom Cruise	Won
MTV Movie Awards	Best Breakthrough Performance	Renée Zellweger	Nominated
MTV Video Music Awards	Best Video from a Film	"Secret Garden" – Bruce Springsteen	Nominated
NAACP Image Awards	Outstanding Actor in a Motion Picture	Cuba Gooding Jr.	Nominated
National Board of Review Awards	Top Ten Films		10th Place
National Board of Review Awards	Best Actor	Tom Cruise	Won
National Board of Review Awards	Breakthrough Performance	Renée Zellweger	Won
National Society of Film Critics Awards	Best Supporting Actress	Renée Zellweger	Runner-up
New York Film Critics Circle Awards	Best Actor	Tom Cruise	Runner-up
Online Film & Television Association Awards	Best Comedy/Musical Picture	James L. Brooks, Cameron Crowe, Laurence Mark and Richard Sakai	Nominated
Online Film & Television Association Awards	Best Actor	Tom Cruise	Nominated
Online Film & Television Association Awards	Best Comedy/Musical Actor	Tom Cruise	Won
Online Film & Television Association Awards	Best Supporting Actor	Cuba Gooding Jr.	Nominated
Online Film & Television Association Awards	Best Original Screenplay	Cameron Crowe	Nominated
Online Film & Television Association Awards	Best Adapted Song	"Secret Garden" – Bruce Springsteen	Nominated
PEN Center USA West Literary Awards	Screenplay	Cameron Crowe	Won
People's Choice Awards	Favorite Dramatic Motion Picture		Won
Satellite Awards	Best Actor in a Motion Picture – Musical or Comedy	Tom Cruise	Won
Satellite Awards	Best Supporting Actor in a Motion Picture – Musical or Comedy	Cuba Gooding Jr.	Won
Satellite Awards	Best Supporting Actress in a Motion Picture – Musical or Comedy	Renée Zellweger	Nominated
Screen Actors Guild Awards	Outstanding Performance by a Male Actor in a Leading Role	Tom Cruise	Nominated
Screen Actors Guild Awards	Outstanding Performance by a Male Actor in a Supporting Role	Cuba Gooding Jr.	Won
Screen Actors Guild Awards	Outstanding Performance by a Female Actor in a Supporting Role	Renée Zellweger	Nominated
Writers Guild of America Awards	Best Screenplay – Written Directly for the Screen	Cameron Crowe	Nominated
Young Artist Awards	Best Performance in a Feature Film – Actor Age Ten or Under	Jonathan Lipnicki	Won
YoungStar Awards	Best Performance by a Young Actor in a Drama Film	Jonathan Lipnicki	Nominated

In 2006, the film's screenplay was voted the 66th greatest ever written in a poll by the Writers Guild of America.

=== Home media ===
Jerry Maguire was first released on VHS and LaserDisc on May 29, 1997, by Columbia TriStar Home Video.

Over 3 million copies were sold during its first week of release. It was re-released on VHS in the late 1990s. In its first week of release on VHS to stores and video stores in 1997, it made $80 million in sales and $7.6 million in rentals. The $80 million was split between video dealers and Columbia TriStar Home Video.

The film was first released onto DVD on June 24, 1997, and on April 30, 2002 respectively in both a standard edition and a two-disc "Special Edition". While the standard edition contains no special features, the two-disc edition primarily includes deleted scenes, commentary tracks, featurettes, and a music video for Bruce Springsteen's "Secret Garden". The film was later released on Blu-ray on September 9, 2008, with the same special features found on the second disc of the "Special Edition" DVD. In 2008, the film was triple-packed with A Few Good Men and Born on the Fourth of July by Sony Pictures Home Entertainment/Universal Pictures Home Entertainment in the United Kingdom only. The film was double-featured with Cliffhanger via DVD in 2008 and also double-featured with A Few Good Men via DVD on December 29, 2009. The film was also chosen to be released in 4K as part of the Columbia Classics Collection: Volume 1 4K Ultra HD box set alongside Mr. Smith Goes to Washington, Dr. Strangelove, Lawrence of Arabia, Gandhi, and A League of Their Own on June 16, 2020.

== Legacy ==
Jerry Maguire spawned several iconic lines, including "Show me the money!" (shouted repeatedly in a phone exchange between Rod Tidwell and Jerry Maguire), "You complete me", "Help me help you," "The key to this business is personal relationships" and "You had me at 'hello'" (said by Renée Zellweger's Dorothy Boyd after a lengthy romantic plea by Jerry Maguire), and "Kwan," a word used by Cuba Gooding Jr.'s Tidwell meaning love, respect, community, and money (also spelled "quan" and "quawn") to illustrate the difference between himself and other football players: "Other football players may have the coin, but they won't have the 'Kwan'." These lines are largely attributed to Cameron Crowe. Zellweger said of filming the famous "hello" line, "Cameron had me say it a few different ways. It's so funny, because when I read it, I didn't get it–I thought it was a typo somehow. I kept looking at it. It was the one thing in the script that I was looking at going, 'Is that right? Can that be right? How is that right?' I thought, 'Is there a better way to say that? Am I not getting it? I just don't know how to do it.'" Furthermore, in a Première interview, Crowe said that he was surprised that "Show me the money!" resonated more with audiences than the "Kwan" concept which he still held a soft spot for. He commented "I like to think that Tidwell [Cuba Gooding Jr.'s character] had been jealous of Dennis Rodman’s blend of pseudo-French trash-talk 'inspirato'" and hinted that he reacted favorably to a fan holding a "Show me the Kwan." sign at an Olympic performance by competitive figure skater Michelle Kwan. Brandt stated in 2014 that "I definitely noticed an uptick of young people becoming interested in the agent business after Jerry Maguire". "Some of what happened to the agent industry would have happened without 'Jerry,' but definitely not as fast as it did," noted Peter Schaffer, who has been a sports agent since 1988.

In June 2008, AFI revealed its "Ten Top Ten"—the best ten films in ten "classic" American film genres—after polling over 1,500 people from the creative community. Jerry Maguire was acknowledged as the tenth best film in the sports genre. It was also voted by AFI as #100 on its list of 100 Passions. The quotes "Show me the money!" and "You had me at 'hello'" were also ranked by AFI on its list of 100 Movie Quotes, ranked No. 25 and #52 respectively.

American Film Institute Lists

- AFI's 100 Years...100 Passions – #100
- AFI's 100 Years...100 Movie Quotes:
  - "Show me the money!" – #25
  - "You had me at 'hello'." – #52
- AFI's 10 Top 10 – #10 Sports Film

In June 2010, Entertainment Weekly named Jerry Maguire one of the 100 Greatest Characters of the Last 20 Years.

The Los Angeles-based artists collective Everything Is Terrible! has amassed the largest collection of Jerry Maguire VHS tapes, observing that, "there seems to be nothing but just Jerry Maguire tapes filling our nation's thrift stores. I have no idea why." VHS tapes are largely sent in by fans of the group who collect them. In 2017, Everything Is Terrible! opened a pop-up video store in Echo Park that exclusively stocked copies of the film from their collection of (at the time) 14,000 tapes. However, no copies were permitted to leave the store. The group has stated that their ultimate goal is to build a pyramid of Jerry Maguire tapes, which they refer to as "Jerrys," in the desert. As of 2023, Everything Is Terrible! had over 40,000 VHS copies of the film. The decision to collect Jerry Maguire tapes is due in part to the distinctive red VHS box design, which is easily noticed among thrift store shelves. Reflecting on the collection, one member of the group commented, "It's bright red, it's beautiful. There are just so many of them."

In 2017, the NFL produced two "A Football Life" mockumentaries to commemorate the film's 20th anniversary edition; they portray the careers of Rod Tidwell and Frank Cushman after the events of the film. Beau Bridges, Jay Mohr, Jerry O'Connell, and Aries Spears reprised their roles from the film, along with Roy Firestone and several real-life sports figures, including Shaquille O'Neal. According to the fictional history, Cushman retired after only four years due to a severe case of athlete's foot, and devoted himself to charity work with children with the same affliction; Tidwell was offered an even more lucrative contract, but declined, declaring that the "quan" was not there, and he preferred to devote more time to his family. The Tidwell mockumentary also features an adult Ray Boyd, inspired by Jerry and Rod to own his own boxing gym.

It was re-released in some theatres in the United States in April 2026, to celebrate its 30th anniversary.

== Sequel ==
In a February 2021 interview, Crowe said he had considered making a sequel to Jerry Maguire and that he had been approached several times about making a TV series adaptation of the film. In both cases, he felt that any continuation of the film's story should focus on Rod Tidwell and his family life with wife Marcee.

== See also ==
- List of American football films
- List of films featuring the deaf and hard of hearing
