= A Month of Sundays (2015 film) =

- Theatrical film poster
- Directed by: Matthew Saville
- Written by: Matthew Saville
- Produced by: Nick Batzias; Matthew Saville; Kirsty Stark
- Starring: Anthony LaPaglia; Julia Blake
- Cinematography: Mark Wareham
- Edited by: Ken Sallows
- Music by: Bryony Marks
- Release dates: 13 September 2015 (Toronto International Film Festival); 28 April 2016 (Australia)
- Country: Australia
- Language: English

A Month of Sundays is a 2015 Australian film starring Anthony LaPaglia.

== Plot ==
Real estate agent Frank Mollard won't admit it, but he can't move on. Divorced but still attached, he can't sell a house in a property boom – much less connect with his teenage son. One night Frank gets a phone call from his mother. Nothing out of the ordinary. Apart from the fact that she died a year ago.

Thus blossoms a charming and unusual friendship with an elderly woman which inspires Frank to reconnect with life.

== Cast ==
- Anthony LaPaglia as Frank Mollard
- Julia Blake as Sarah
- John Clarke as Phillip Lang
- Wayne Anthoney as Noel Lang
- Justine Clarke as Wendy McKinnon
- Donal Forde as Damien
- Terence Crawford as Stuart
- Gary Sweet as Gary Sweet
- Patrick Graham as Adam Tregonning
- Mandahla Rose as Young PA

== Production ==
A Month of Sundays was co-produced by Kirsty Stark and Nick Batzias.

== Reception ==
On Rotten Tomatoes, the film has an approval rating of 63% based on reviews from 19 critics.

Luke Buckmaster of The Guardian wrote "Situations, subplots and even barely seen characters are unified with an almost cosmic sense of fate." David Nusair of Reel Film Reviews wrote "One can only hope that this marks a temporary stumble for an otherwise talented filmmaker." Paul Byrnes in the Sydney Morning Herald said "A Month of Sundays is a small miracle of a film – an odd combination of modesty and ambition."
