= Lottie Moggach =

English journalist and author

- Occupations: Journalist and author
- Notable work: Kiss Me First (2013)
- Partner: Chris Atkins
- Mother: Deborah Moggach
- Awards: Portsmouth First Fiction Award

Lottie Moggach is an English journalist and author. Her mother is the author Deborah Moggach.

== Career ==
Her debut novel, Kiss Me First, was published in 2013. It is about Leila, a woman who is obsessed with computers, who helps a woman called Tess disappear without anyone realising by taking over Tess's email and social media accounts. It won the Portsmouth First Fiction Award and was shortlisted for the Guardian First Book Award and the Specsavers National Book Awards. The book was adapted into a television series.

In 2017, she published her second novel Under the Sun. It is set in 2008 and centres on Anna, who has moved from London to Southern Spain with her partner, Michael. The story focuses on what happens after he leaves her suddenly. While it begins as a love story, it turns into something more political and focuses on topics such as displacement and institutional racism.

Moggach's third novel, Brixton Hill, was published in 2020. It focuses on Rob, a prisoner coming to the end of his sentence in an open prison who is allowed to work in a charity shop where he meets a woman called Steph.

Moggach's fourth novel, Mrs Pearcey, was published in 2026 by Phoenix. It was inspired by the true story of the murders committed by Mary Peachey. which she discussed on the BBC Radio 4 programme Start the Week.

Her work as a journalist has appeared in The Times, Financial Times, Time Out, Elle, and GQ.

== Personal life ==
She is the daughter of author Deborah Moggach. Lottie was in a relationship with Chris Atkins; the pair remain close and have one son.
