= Leigh Steinberg =

American sports agent (born 1949)

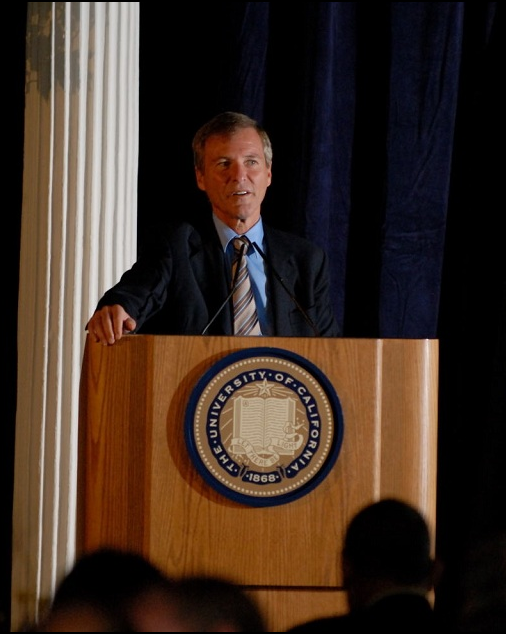
- Steinberg speaking at UC Berkeley
- Born: Leigh William Steinberg; March 27, 1949 (age 77); Los Angeles, California, U.S.
- Education: University of California, Berkeley (B.A., J.D)
- Occupations: Sports agent, Lawyer
- Years active: 1974-present
- Known for: Sports agent, Jerry Maguire, philanthropy, advocacy
- Children: 3

Leigh William Steinberg (born March 27, 1949) is an American sports agent, philanthropist, and author. During his 50-year career, Steinberg has represented over 300 professional athletes in football, baseball, basketball, boxing, and Olympic sports. He has represented the No. 1 overall pick in the NFL draft a record eight times. Steinberg is often credited as the real-life inspiration for the sports agent in Cameron Crowe's film Jerry Maguire in 1996.

== Background ==
Steinberg was born and raised in Los Angeles by his parents, a teacher and a librarian, who pushed public service along with ambition. He attended Hamilton High School. He attended the University of California Los Angeles, for one year (1966–67) before transferring to the University of California, Berkeley. He also was a resident assistant at the UC Berkeley dorms and had Steve Bartkowski and Steve Wozniak on his floor. Steinberg eventually formed his own student government political party, called Unity. His moderate politics at the protest-prone Berkeley at the height of the Vietnam War drew such a following that he was elected President of the Associated Students of the University of California, the university's student government. He subsequently resigned from his post as a result of a cheating scandal. He earned a B.A. in political science in 1970 and a J.D. in 1973 from UC Berkeley.

== Business ==
For many years Steinberg and Jeff Moorad had a sports agency partnership called "Steinberg, Moorad & Dunn", or "SMD". They sold that firm in October 1999 to Assante Sports Management Group, a Canadian financial-management firm, for a reported $120 million. Assante acquired several other sports agencies. In February 2002, David Dunn left SMD to open Athletes First, taking about 50 NFL players with him and opening offices about a mile from Steinberg's in Newport Beach, Calif. Extensive litigation ensued involving Dunn and Assante.

Steinberg has successfully negotiated over $3 billion in contracts for players including Troy Aikman, Steve Young, and Patrick Mahomes. He has represented the No. 1 pick overall in the NFL draft a record eight times, in addition to representing over 60 other first round draft picks in the NFL.

== Philanthropy ==
Steinberg has actively been involved with the Human Relations Commission, Children Now, Children's Miracle Network, Coro Fellows Program, and the Starlight Foundation. He founded and underwrites the Steinberg Leadership Institute, a nationwide program run by the Anti-Defamation League preparing students to fight racism and inequality throughout the world which has since become the Glass Leadership Institute. He has endowed scholarships at his high school, donated time and resources to organizations such as Special Olympics, Juvenile Diabetes Foundation, and Junior Achievement. He has also endowed a classroom at Boalt Hall at the University of California at Berkeley. Steinberg's community activism has drawn praise from the political world. He has received accommodations from Congress, State Senate, State Legislature, The Los Angeles City Council, Orange County Board of Supervisors, Ronald Reagan, George H. W. Bush, and Bill Clinton.

== Entertainment ==
Steinberg has received screen credit as a technical consultant on several films, including Jerry Maguire, Any Given Sunday, and For the Love of the Game. He has also worked as a consultant for the HBO original series Arli$$ and served as the title sponsor of the annual Newport Beach Film Festival.

Steinberg made an appearance in the film Jerry Maguire, and is credited as the real life inspiration of the sports agents from that film.

He has developed original television and film content for Fox Television, Warner Brothers Studios, ABC Entertainment, and HBO. He has been at the forefront of the Internet revolution, creating and building sports websites, strategically aligning his firm with ESPN's Sportzone.com and developing online marketing courseware for professionals and students alike. He has lent his marketing expertise to the video game software business and served as a member of the Board of Directors for two software manufacturers.

== Media appearances and book writing ==
Steinberg wrote a best-selling book with Michael D'Orso, Winning with Integrity: Getting What You Want Without Selling Your Soul, published by Three Rivers Press in October 1999. The book provides readers insight on how to improve their life through non-confrontational negotiating. The majority of the proceeds raised on his 1999 book tour were donated to the Junior Achievement Educational Foundation. His book The Agent: My 40-Year Career Making Deals and Changing the Game was published in 2014.

Steinberg was a speaker at the independently organized TED Talk hosted by Chapman University. He spoke about "Making an impact in the world through sports". Steinberg gave key insights into the changes he's brought to the world through sports; one of his strategies was to encourage his clients to give back to the high school community that helped shape them. Steinberg made it a practice not to take any clients who weren't interested in contributing.

== Other ==
In 1992, Steinberg helped lead a successful campaign to prevent the San Francisco Giants baseball club from relocating to Florida. For his efforts, then San Francisco Mayor Frank Jordan honored him by declaring "Leigh Steinberg Day" in the city of San Francisco soon after.

In 1994, then Oakland Mayor Elihu Harris utilized Steinberg as a consultant in his successful bid to prevent the Oakland Athletics baseball club from relocating to Sacramento or San Jose.

Steinberg also served as co-chairperson of the "Save the Rams" committee in its unsuccessful 1990s attempt to keep the franchise from leaving Southern California and was active in pursuits to attract a new football franchise to locate in Los Angeles.

== Personal life ==
He lives in Southern California and has three children.

=== Bankruptcy ===
Steinberg describes his financial problems as having mounted since 2003, when he became involved with extensive litigation with Dunn and Assante (see above), escalating with his 2008 divorce settlement, and also exacerbated by problems with alcoholism. Steinberg was arrested for DUI in 1997 and again in 2007, and for public intoxication in 2008, all in Newport Beach, California. In December 2011, it was reported that a bench warrant had been issued against Steinberg after he failed to appear at a scheduled hearing, concerning an unpaid judgement of $1.4 million, by far the largest of several debts he owes; in fact the bench warrant was authorized by a judge but never issued. On January 11, 2012 Steinberg filed for Chapter 7 bankruptcy protection. In 2012 a party thrown by friends celebrated two years of sober living for Steinberg. Steinberg celebrated a decade of sobriety in 2020.
