= Kirsty Stark =

Australian film producer

- Education: Flinders University
- Occupation: Film producer
- Organisation(s): Epic Films, Matchbox Pictures
- Notable work: A Month of Sundays (2015); Unboxed (2018); First Day (2020)
- Website: kirstystark.com

Kirsty Stark is an Australian film producer based in Adelaide, South Australia. In 2010, she established a production company called Epic Films, and in 2023, an online platform called CrewHQ, which provides an online jobs market for freelancers in the Australian film industry. She is known for her work on the 2018 ABC iview series Unboxed and 2020 TV drama series First Day. She is the development producer in the South Australian office of Matchbox Pictures.

== Early life and education ==
Kirsty Stark grew up in Adelaide. As a child and teenager, she read voraciously and "just always had an interest in storytelling". She lived overseas for several years before starting her degree at Flinders University, where she studied film.

She later undertook Seth Godin's "altMBA", a month-long "online leadership workout".

== Career ==
Stark spent five years working in cinematography as a camera assistant.

She founded a film and television production company, Epic Films, based in Adelaide, in 2010. The company's first two films were the short films Landscape Scene and L'Artiste!, both screened in festivals internationally in 2011. Epic Films won was Screen Producers Association of Australia's Breakthrough Business of the Year in 2016. The company mainly undertook low-budget projects, working with emerging writers and directors and often having difficulties getting them into production.

In 2013 she produced the sci-fi web series Wastelander Panda (described by the SAFC (SAFC) as an "online sensation"), and in 2016 the comedy series Goober, both released on ABC iview.

She produced the 2015 feature film A Month of Sundays (for Madman), directed by Matt Saville and starring Anthony LaPaglia and Justine Clarke.

Stark started partnering with a larger production company, Matchbox Pictures, as well as doing work with Screen Australia, within around six months of completing the altMBA course. In June 2018, after Matchbox Pictures opened offices in Adelaide, Stark was appointed to a newly-created role, as development producer for the company. The company started shooting season 3 of Wanted, directed by Jocelyn Moorhouse and starring Rebecca Gibney, in South Australia.

In 2018 she co-produced, with Rebecca Elliott, the ABC iview series Unboxed, written and directed by Sam Matthews. In the series, six transgender artists – including a dancer, a musician, a writer, and a graphic artist – create a work based on the theme "unboxed", while talking about their experiences.

She was co-producer on the 2020 children's TV series First Day and (for Matchbox), on the 2020 TV drama series Stateless for Matchbox and Dirty Pictures.

Other production companies she has enjoyed working with include Closer Productions, Dinosaur Worldwide, and Studio Sunkie & Young Black Youth, and chooses to stay and work in Adelaide. She has named director Sophie Hyde and producer Rebecca Summerton (of Closer Productions), local ACS president Ernie Clark, and producer Nick Batzias (with whom she worked on 2015's A Month of Sundays) as mentors.

== Other activities ==
In 2023, Stark established the online platform CrewHQ, which supports freelance film crew by providing a national online jobs market, and also runs an annual conference, CrewCon.

Stark teaches short courses at the Australian Film, Television and Radio School (AFTRS).

As of 2025 Stark is co-chair of The Mercury. She has given presentations at SXSW, TEDx Adelaide, AFTRS, and the South Australian Film Corporation. In June 2025 she is scheduled to speak at the 25th anniversary of the "Regional to Global 2025" event for Screenworks.

== Recognition and awards ==
- 2010: Inaugural NFSA and ACS John Leake OAM ACS Award for an Emerging Cinematographer
- 2019: Unboxed: Grand Jury Prize and Best Documentary, at the South Australian Screen Awards
- 2020: First Day: 8 international awards, including an Emmy, GLAAD Media Award, Kidscreen Award, Rose d'Or, and a Banff Rockie Award
- 2022: Selected for the Global Producers Exchange as part of the Australians in Film initiative, supported by the SAFC
- 2023: Listed in the "40 Under 40" list of leaders by Solstice Media
