= Kiss Me First (TV series) =

British cyber-thriller drama series

- Genre: Mystery; Crime; Drama; Thriller
- Created by: Bryan Elsley
- Based on: Kiss Me First by Lottie Moggach
- Written by: Bryan Elsley
- Directed by: Misha Manson-Smith
- Starring: Tallulah Haddon; Simona Brown; Matthew Beard; George Jovanovic; Freddie Stewart; Misia Butler; Haruka Abe; Samuel Bottomley
- Country of origin: United Kingdom
- Original language: English
- No. of series: 1
- No. of episodes: 6

Production
- Executive producers: Bryan Elsley; Melanie Stokes
- Producer: Bradley Adams
- Editor: Matthew Tabern
- Production companies: Balloon; Kindle Entertainment

Original release
- Network: Channel 4
- Release: 2 April – 7 May 2018

Kiss Me First is a British cyber thriller television drama series created by Bryan Elsley for Channel 4 and Netflix. It began airing on 2 April 2018 on Channel 4 and was made available on Netflix worldwide on 29 June 2018.

== Premise ==
Leila is a lonely 17-year-old girl addicted to a fictional massively multiplayer online role-playing game called Azana. While playing it, Leila meets Tess, a cool and confident party girl who harbours a dark secret. In the real world, the two girls become friends, but after Tess disappears Leila is quickly drawn into unravelling the mystery behind her disappearance.

== Cast ==
=== Main ===
- Tallulah Haddon as Leila Evans / Shadowfax
- Simona Brown as Tess / Mania
- Matthew Beard as Adrian Palmer
- Matthew Aubrey as Jonty

=== Recurring ===
- George Jovanovic as Cyril Niemec / Calumny
- Freddie Stewart as Kyle / Force
- Misia Butler as Jack Innes / Jocasta
- Haruka Abe as Tomiko Teshima / Tippi
- Samuel Bottomley as Ben / Denier
- Philip Arditti as Azul
- Geraldine Somerville as Ruth Palmer

== Production ==
In January 2016, it was reported that Netflix and E4 would co-produce a series based on the Lottie Moggach novel of the same title, consisting of six hour-long episodes, with Netflix holding the international broadcast rights and E4 the ones for the United Kingdom. The series is a mix of live-action performances and computer-generated scenes. Principal photography started in December 2016 in London locations including Hanwell and West Ealing and Croatia and was expected to end in the middle of 2017. In February 2018, it was announced it would now air on Channel 4 and the first image was released.

Krka National Park in Croatia is the location of the scenic green pools and cascading waterfalls for the real life scenes in the last two episodes, and the basis of the virtual world scenes in earlier episodes. The Shellness Road Car Park was used in a sequence in which one character uses an improvised explosive device to blow up his abusive carer. A further scene was filmed on Leysdown Promenade showing the arrival by one of the leads on a bus. Leysdown on Sea is a coastal town on the Isle of Sheppey in Kent.

Filming locations also included West London Film Studios.

== Episodes ==
No.	Title	Directed by	Written by	Original release date
1	"She Did Something"	Misha Manson-Smith	Bryan Elsley	2 April 2018
Leila is a lonely 17-year-old girl whose mother has just died. She is addicted to a fictional virtual reality online gaming site called Azana. There, she makes contact with Mania, a mysterious player who watches her. In the real world, Leila is forced to get a roommate and a job in order to pay bills. In the virtual world, Leila stumbles upon Red Pill, a hidden place in Azana, where she meets troubled players Force, Tippi, Denier, Jocasta, and Calumny, who blames himself for his violent father’s acts of beating on his mother. She also sees Mania there, before being kicked out by Adrian, the creator of the exclusive Red Pill. In the real world, Leila comes into contact with Mania, whose real name is Tess. Tess invites Leila, as well as Leila’s new roommate Jonty, an actor, to a club. That night, Tess and Leila go to Tess’ home and Leila, while Tess sleeps, enters Azana as Mania. She witnesses Adrian urge a vulnerable Calumny into jumping off a virtual cliff, while in reality, unknown to Leila, he jumps off the roof of a building.
2	"Make It Stop"	Misha Manson-Smith	Bryan Elsley	9 April 2018
In Azana, Adrian says goodbye to Calumny’s avatar, which turns to dust. In a flashback, Leila purchases powerful drugs from a pharmacy. Leila later reveals to Tess that she intentionally administered a high dosage of the drugs to her mother, who died as a result of overmedication, because her mother had wanted to choose when she died. In Azana, Adrian tells Leila that everybody needs something, and in Red Pill everybody gets what they need regardless of what it is. In the real world, Leila discovers that Calumny’s avatar has been deactivated. Additionally, Tess moves in with Leila when she is kicked out of another friend’s home she was staying in. Tess and Leila soon thereafter enter Red Pill together, wherein Leila inquires about Calumny’s disappearance. Adrian tells her that he gave Calumny what he needed and stresses that he has found peace. In the real world, Leila visits Calumny’s home, and discovers that Calumny, whose real name is Cyryl, committed suicide by jumping off a building. When Leila enters Red Pill and confronts Adrian with her discovery, he tells her that the thing she needs the most she will receive. He tosses her off the cliff, and she awakens as a little girl as her mother calls for her.
3	"Off the Rails"	Misha Manson-Smith	Rachel Hirons & Bryan Elsley	16 April 2018
In March 2005, the gaming world of Azana is created by Ruth Palmer, and is met with widespread acclaim. However, Palmer is later convicted for the manslaughter of her husband and business partner. Now, following an appeal, she has been freed. In Red Pill, Tippi reveals to Leila that Tess had previously attempted to commit suicide, and that Adrian believes that Leila is helping her get better. In the real world, Leila meets with one of her ex-school teachers and asks for his help in hacking into Azana, to no immediate success. Leila later realizes that Adrian has been watching her by way of hacking into her webcam monitor. In Red Pill, Adrian tells Tess that she underestimates Leila’s abilities to change things. In the real world, Leila successfully blackmails Tess’ boyfriend, a married man, in order to get him to stop seeing her. Leila also reaches out to Denier, who has been speaking with Adrian often lately. Denier, whose real name is Ben, lives in a children’s home run by an abusive foster father. Leila finds him there and tells him that he shouldn’t listen to everything Adrian tells him, but Ben assures her that everything will be alright. Returning home, Leila finds Tess in a fit, as a result of her boyfriend dumping her, and she manages to settle Tess down. Meanwhile, Ben blows himself up along with his abusive foster father, in the latter’s car. Upon learning of Ben’s death, Leila confronts Tess, pushing that it was Adrian’s fault. She then destroys Tess’ VR equipment and computer before declaring that she is going after Adrian.
4	"Friends Let Us Down"	Tom Green	Laura Deeley & Bryan Elsley	23 April 2018
Tess has disappeared. Neither Leila nor Adrian know where she is, and both are searching for her. In Red Pill, Adrian tells Force that Leila will destroy Red Pill and that he needs Force’s help in stopping her. He says that in exchange for his help, Adrian will help bring him and Jocasta together in person. In the real world, Force, whose real name is Kyle, is revealed to be a disturbed young man with a gun collection who is infatuated with Jocasta. Meanwhile, Jocasta is revealed to be a young man named Jack. Leila, with the help of her ex-teacher Mr. Adams, discovers evidence of Adrian’s hacking work, while Adrian leaks video surveillance footage of Leila talking to Ben in order to paint her as a witness to Ben’s death. In Red Pill, Adrian shows Tess a video replay of Leila, as Mania, seemingly persuading Calumny into jumping off the cliff. He then tells Tess that they will soon be all together - at his place. In the real world, at her request, Jonty drives Leila to meet Ruth Palmer. Leila asks Ruth for her help, but she declines. Upon returning home, Jonty and Leila have sex. Afterward, Leila goes to work and finds Kyle there, who has traveled from America to London. He tells her that he is supposed to watch her and ensure that she doesn’t do anything to mess with Adrian’s plans. Adrian then sends Kyle Jocasta's address. There, a shocked Kyle meets Jack, who pleads with him, stressing that love is love no matter the gender. At the same time, Leila locks Jonty out of the house, having discovered his phone messages with Adrian. The next day, Leila receives a base protocol box from Ruth Palmer, allowing her access to aspects of Azara, with Mr. Adams' assistance. While Leila is in Azara, Kyle sneaks in, and upon leaving the game she finds Mr. Adams dead of apparent strangulation. Meanwhile, Jack's housekeeper arrives home to find blood all over the floor. Leila returns home to find Kyle outside her house. He tells her he told Jocasta to lay low and wait for him, and offers to help Leila find Tess.
5	"The Witch Is Coming"	Tom Green	Jamie Brittain & Lauren Sequeira	30 April 2018
Tess meets Tippi, whose real name is Tomiko, at Adrian’s place in Croatia. They enjoy expensive food and alcohol, and Tomiko burns Tess's "old life" items, including her passport. Tomiko gives her a red pill to take every day, saying Adrian is trusting them to believe. Meanwhile, Kyle and Leila are on their way to Croatia. Tess discovers a cassette tape and plays it. On it, Adrian verbally directs her to a real-life version of the lake she enjoyed swimming in while in Red Pill. Returning to Adrian’s place, Tess discloses the cassette tape to Tomiko, who is visibly hurt when she hears Adrian call Tess special on it. Leila and Kyle stop overnight at a small cabin. When she asks why he's helping her, Kyle says that she helped him work things out. When sharing a bed, they begin to have sex, but Kyle calls her Jocasta and she shoves him off her and rushes out of the cabin, where she hears Adrian talking to her from the woods. When Leila tries to drive away, Kyle stops her and strangles her, saying she's "ruining it," but stops short of killing her. Leila punches him and escapes in the car. Back at Adrian’s place, Tomiko and Tess both have somewhat hallucinatory experiences. Leila arrives and meets Tomiko, who is revealed to have worked as a prostitute before meeting Adrian in Azara. Leila attempts to persuade Tess into leaving with her. She says that Adrian will kill her for his amusement - like he did with the others. However, Tomiko says that it was Leila’s fault Calumny and Denier died and Tess declares that she will not leave. Tess tells Leila that she was a test and she passed it. Leila tells Tess that she is right, she has won, and walks away. Adrian reveals himself to be the son of Ruth Palmer to Leila. He also declares a multiplayer combat game with a tactical twist and tells Leila to look out the window of her bedroom. Leila deduces that Adrian has instructed Tomiko to kill Tess. Leila is then forced to knock the knife-wielding Tomiko down and save Tess. Tess dives into the lake, but instead of seeing the monster she finds in Azana, she is attacked by Kyle, who tries to drown her. Leila arrives and stabs Kyle to death. Leila seemingly drowns while Tess manages to get to the surface, where she passes out. Adrian declares that "the world's fucked up" before musing that life is an "adventure playground" that should not be taken so seriously.
6	"You Can Never Go Home"	Tom Green	Laura Deeley & Bryan Elsley	7 May 2018
Leila wakes up strapped to a table in a dark room. Meanwhile, Jonty breaks into Leila’s house by way of an unlocked window and discovers Tess there. Tess asks Jonty to take her to the last place Leila went, which was Ruth Palmer's house. Tess confronts Ruth about her son’s activities before leaving. Back in the dark room, Adrian, appearing as a digital version of himself, offers Leila absolution, and tortures her with visions of "what she did." In a hospital, Jack is revealed to be comatose, having been badly beaten by Kyle - but not killed. The next day, Azana agent Saul Green arrives at Leila’s house and meets Tess, asking her to come with him. At Azana headquarters, Tess and Jonty meet Tracy, head of corporate resolution. Tracy and Saul believe Leila to be behind the suicides, but Tess insists they look into Adrian. Instead, they show her that Tomiko has met with the press and spun a story placing Leila as the master manipulator of the group. In the dark room, Adrian messes with Leila, who fights back against him, eventually awakening from the dark room, discovering she was in VR the whole time. Looking for food and somewhere safe, Leila goes to her boss, Azul. Azul gives her the base protocol box, which Tess had hidden with him. Leila tells Azul what has been happening. Tess and Jonty reunite with Leila at Azul’s cafe. Using the base protocol box, Leila hacks into Azana, publicly releasing Red Pill. Ruth watches as Leila enters Azana in a live stream and meets Adrian. Leila confronts him about what he did and tells him to go fuck himself as she exits. Leila, Jonty, and Tess leave in Azul’s van. In the hospital, Jack wakes up. Adrian calls Leila and tells her that she has hurt him, before saying that he is coming for her. Adrian states that a new adventure is coming and that he’ll see her around.
