= Runyararo Mapfumo =

British television and film director

Runyararo Mapfumo is a British television director, film director, writer, and producer. She is known for her work on the critically acclaimed Netflix television series Sex Education.

== Background ==
Mapfumo is of Zimbabwean heritage. In 2013, Mapfumo graduated from Sheffield Hallam University with a first class honours degree in film and visual effects.

== Career ==
Mapfumo has received funding from the British Film Institute, the BBC, and Google Arts. She has featured in the BFI London Film Festival. Her third short, Masterpiece, was shown at the 2020 We Are One: A Global Film Festival.

== Filmography ==
=== Director ===
Sources:

- Kaos (2024) - TV series
- Sex Education (2021) - TV series
- What's in a Name? (2020) - short
- The Uncertain Kingdom (2020) - documentary
- Dawn in the Dark (2019) - short
- Sensational Simmy! (2019) - short
- Masterpiece (2017) - short
- The Time Is Now (2015) - short
- Revelation (2013) - short
