= Mary Pearcey =

British murderer

- Born: Mary Eleanor Wheeler; 26 March 1866; Ightham, Kent, United Kingdom
- Died: 23 December 1890 (aged 24); London, United Kingdom
- Cause of death: Execution by hanging
- Criminal charges: Murder
- Penalty: Death by hanging

Mary Eleanor Pearcey (née Wheeler; 26 March 1866 – 23 December 1890) was an English woman who was convicted of murdering her lover's wife, Mrs. Phoebe Hogg, and child, Tiggy, on 24 October 1890 and hanged for the crime on 23 December of the same year. The crime is sometimes mentioned in connection with Jack the Ripper, and Pearcey has been posited as a Ripper candidate.

== Early life ==
Pearcey was born Mary Eleanor Wheeler in 1866. It has been erroneously stated that her father was Thomas Wheeler who was convicted of and hanged for the murder of Edward Anstee. However, author Sarah Beth Hopton was unable to find any evidence of connection between the two people, and also found a retraction of the newspaper article in which the misinformation was first printed.

Mary Wheeler took the name "Pearcey" from John Charles Pearcey, a carpenter with whom she had lived. He left her because of her infidelity. She later took up residence with a furniture remover, Frank Hogg, who had at least one other lover, Phoebe Styles. Styles became pregnant, and Hogg married her at Pearcey's urging. They lived in Kentish Town in London. She gave birth to a daughter also named Phoebe Hogg.

== Murder of Phoebe Hogg ==
On 24 October 1890, Mrs. Hogg, with her baby, called on Pearcey at her invitation. At around 4:00 p.m., neighbours reportedly heard screaming and sounds of violence. That evening, a woman's corpse was found on a heap of rubbish in Hampstead. Her skull had been crushed, and her head was nearly severed from her body. A black perambulator was found about a mile away, its cushions soaked with blood. An eighteen-month-old child was found dead in Finchley, apparently smothered. After the adult body was initially speculated to be that of an 'unfortunate' in the press, it was eventually identified as Phoebe Hogg, with the toddler's body being that of her daughter. Mary Pearcey had been seen pushing baby Tiggy's perambulator around the streets of North London after dark. The police searched her house, and found blood spatter on the walls, ceiling, a skirt and an apron, as well as matted hair and blood on a fireplace poker and a carving knife. When questioned by the police, she said that she 'had a problem with mice and was trying to kill them'. Sir Melville Macnaghten wrote that Pearcey would later respond by chanting, "Killing mice, killing mice, killing mice!".

Mary Pearcey was charged with murder. She maintained her innocence throughout the trial, but was convicted, and was hanged on 23 December 1890.

Pearcey's murder case generated extraordinary press attention at the time. Madame Tussauds wax museum of London made a wax figure of Pearcey for their Chamber of Horrors exhibit, and also purchased the pram used in the murder and the contents of Pearcey's kitchen. When the Tussaud exhibit of these items opened, it attracted a crowd of 30,000 people. The noose used to hang Pearcey is on display at the Crime Museum in New Scotland Yard.

Pearcey was portrayed by Joanna David in the 1980 Granada television series Lady Killers (episode 4, 'Killing Mice').

The murder was the inspiration for Lottie Moggach's 2026 novel Mrs Pearcey .

== Execution ==
On 23 December 1890, Pearcey was hanged by James Berry. Berry noted her strong composure in the condemned cell, describing her as "the most composed person in the whole [execution] party."

When prompted to make a final statement Pearcey said, "My sentence is a just one, but a good deal of the evidence against me was false". At first she declined the assistance of female prison warders, but after further prompting, accepted their assistance saying, "Oh, well, if you don't mind going with me, I am pleased."

In his memoirs, Berry described Pearcey's execution as "quiet and painless."

== Jack the Ripper ==
Mary Pearcey, like many other famous Victorian-era murderers, has been suggested as a suspect in the Jack the Ripper slayings. She was apparently the only female suspect mentioned at the time. Sir Arthur Conan Doyle, creator of Sherlock Holmes, speculated at the time that the Ripper might have been female, as a woman could have pretended to be a midwife and be seen in public in bloody clothing without arousing suspicion or notice. This theory was then expanded upon in 1939 by William Stewart in his book Jack the Ripper: A New Theory, which specifically named Pearcey in connection with the crimes. All evidence given is circumstantial, and there is no physical evidence or eyewitness reports linking Pearcey to the Ripper crimes.

F. Tennyson Jesse, the British criminal historian, explained the theory in her study of Pearcey's case: "It was no wonder that, simultaneously with the discovery of the crime, legends should have sprung up around her figure. The rumour even arose that the notorious Jack the Ripper had been at work in the locality, and though this was quickly disproved, yet the violence and horror associated with the crime was such as to make it understandable how the rumour arose in the first place. Even in the earliest paragraphs which announced the discovery of the crime, several false statements were suggested."

In May 2006, DNA testing of saliva on stamps affixed to letters allegedly sent by Jack the Ripper to London newspapers, and thought by some modern writers to be genuine, appeared to come from a woman. This led to extensive discussion of Pearcey and her crime in the global press.

== In popular culture ==
Pearcey was portrayed by Joanna David in the Granada Television series Lady Killers.

== See also ==
- List of proposed Jack the Ripper suspects
