= Evie MacDonald =

Australian actress, model, and activist

- Born: 2004 or 2005 (age 20–21); Melbourne, Victoria, Australia
- Occupations: Actress; writer; activist

Evangeline MacDonald is an Australian actress, model, and transgender rights activist. She starred as Hannah Bradford in the drama series First Day.

== Biography ==
Born to parents from Melbourne, Victoria, Australia, she is the middle child of five siblings. She began modelling aged six and transitioned aged nine. In 2016, she was one of ten trans children photographed by Emma Leslie for her Transcend portrait series. She has stated that she attended a Christian school and spent several weeks undergoing conversion therapy. She and her family campaigned and travelled to Canberra to speak with MPs, which helped instigate a 2017 landmark court case that meant minors no longer had to go to a family court to obtain gender-affirming care.

In 2017, and aged 12, MacDonald began appearing as Hannah Bradford in First Day, making her the first openly transgender person to play the lead role in an Australian TV program. Trans showgirl Carlotta had previously played a trans character in Number 96 in 1973. In the program, Bradford is a 12-year-old transgender girl who recently started middle school. Directed by Julie Kalceff, First Day aired a series on ABC Me and CBBC in 2020, which was added to YouTube in 2025 in response to increased transphobia. A further series aired in 2022. The show received positive reception and won an International Children's Emmy Award, a Rose d'Or, and a GLAAD Media Award for outstanding children and family programming.

In September 2018, Evie criticised the then-prime minister Scott Morrison on The Project after he retweeted a transphobic The Daily Telegraph piece and complained about "gender whisperers" in schools. A further episode of The Project that month featured a segment on her transition and was criticised for deadnaming her. In 2025, she appeared on GLAAD's "20 Under 20" list. Her social media content is partially lifestyle and partially advocacy. Her mother Meaghan MacDonald co-founded Parents of Gender Diverse Children with her friend Karyn Walker.
