= Misia Butler =

British actor

- Born: London, England
- Occupation: Actor
- Years active: 2016–present

Misia Butler is a British actor best known for his portrayal of Caeneus in the Netflix television series KAOS.

== Early life and education ==
Misia Butler was born in London, England, where he grew up.

He was interested in acting from a young age and received training through an acting course by the charity Gendered Intelligence in collaboration with the Central School of Speech and Drama in London.

== Career ==
Butler's first acting role was at the age of 15 in an episode of the British BBC medical TV series Casualty in 2016. Following his role in Casualty he got an agent. In 2018 Butler appeared in the Netflix miniseries Kiss Me First. He then went on to appear in the movie The School for Good and Evil and the Netflix series The Bastard Son & The Devil Himself in 2022.

In 2022, Butler auditioned for the Netflix TV series KAOS, which follows Greek mythology and landed a starring role playing the character of Caeneus, a mythological figure. The show was released on 29 August 2024.

== Personal life ==
Butler is a transgender man and uses he/him pronouns.

In an essay published in 2024 for Yahoo News, Butler talked about his role model Elliot Page and the importance of queer representation in TV and movies.

== Filmography ==
Film
Year	Title	Role	Notes	Ref.
2022	The School for Good and Evil	Tarquin		
2026	Virginia Woolf's Night and Day			

Television
Year	Title	Role	Notes	Ref.
2016	Casualty	Robert		
2018	Kiss Me First	Jocasta		
2022	The Bastard Son & The Devil Himself	Niall		
2024	KAOS	Caeneus		
2026	A Good Girl’s Guide to Murder	Stanley Forbes		
