= Kaos (TV series) =

2024 British dark-comedy TV series

- Promotional release poster
- Genre: Comedy-drama; Dark comedy; Fantasy
- Created by: Charlie Covell
- Based on: Greek mythology
- Directed by: Georgi Banks-Davies; Runyararo Mapfumo
- Starring: Jeff Goldblum; Janet McTeer; Cliff Curtis; David Thewlis; Killian Scott; Stephen Dillane; Aurora Perrineau; Misia Butler; Leila Farzad; Nabhaan Rizwan; Rakie Ayola; Stanley Townsend; Billie Piper
- Music by: Isabella Summers
- Country of origin: United Kingdom
- Original language: English
- No. of series: 1
- No. of episodes: 8

Production
- Executive producers: Charlie Covell; Chris Fry; Georgi Banks-Davies; Jane Featherstone; John Woodward; Nina Lederman; Tanya Seghatchian
- Producers: Harry Munday; Katie Carpenter; Michael Eagle-Hodgson
- Production locations: United Kingdom; Spain
- Running time: 46–56 minutes
- Production companies: Anthem Productions Limited; Sister

Original release
- Network: Netflix
- Release: 29 August 2024

Kaos (stylised as KAOS) is a British mythological dark comedy television series created by Charlie Covell for Netflix. It revolves around three humans as they discover their common connection to a prophecy and to each other while dealing with the corrupt and arrogant gods of Greek mythology. The eight-part series was released on Netflix on 29 August 2024. In October 2024, it was cancelled after one series.

== Premise ==
The all-powerful yet insecure Greek god Zeus keeps the Titan Prometheus shackled to the side of a cliff, torturing him as punishment for having dared to interfere with his arbitrary and autocratic rule. Prometheus, who acts throughout as narrator, tells of a prophecy: "A line appears, the order wanes, the family falls, and Kaos reigns." Having for many years bided his time, Prometheus now activates his plan to overthrow Zeus with the help of the prophecy and the unwitting involvement of three mortal humans: Eurydice, Caeneus, and Ariadne.

== Cast ==
- Jeff Goldblum as Zeus
- Janet McTeer as Hera
- Aurora Perrineau as Eurydice ("Riddy")
- Cliff Curtis as Poseidon
- David Thewlis as Hades
- Rakie Ayola as Persephone
- Killian Scott as Orpheus
- Leila Farzad as Ariadne ("Ari")
- Nabhaan Rizwan as Dionysus
- Debi Mazar as Medusa
- Stephen Dillane as Prometheus
- Misia Butler as Caeneus (né Caenis)
- Mat Fraser as Daedalus
- Stanley Townsend as Minos
- Billie Piper as Cassandra
- Fates
  - Suzy Eddie Izzard as Lachesis ("Lachy")
  - Ché as Clotho
  - Sam Buttery as Atropos
- Furies
  - Cathy Tyson as Alecto
  - Donna Banya as Tisiphone ("Tisi")
  - Natalie Klamar as Megaera ("Meg")
- Fady Elsayed as Glaucus/Minotaur
- Michelle Greenidge as the Tacita
- Gilian Cally as Hecuba
- Shila Ommi as Pasiphae ("Pas")
- Amanda Douge as Andromache
- Daniel Lawrence Taylor as Theseus
- Ramon Tikaram as Charon
- Joe McGann as Polyphemus
- Rosie Cavaliero as Prue
- Daniel Monks as Astyanax ("Nax")
- Slavko Sobin as Carl Crixus

== Episodes ==
No.	Episode	Directed by	Written by	Original release date
1	Episode 1	Georgi Banks-Davies	Charlie Covell	29 August 2024
On Mount Olympus, the capricious and cruel god Zeus rules over a modern Greek world, and expects mortals to pay frequent public homage to him. He is upset over the desecration of the Olympia Day monument in Krete, and rages that the people are not paying him sufficient respect. A small wrinkle has appeared on Zeus's forehead, a sign of ageing that should not happen to an immortal, and he frets that it may represent the 'line' mentioned in the prophecy that he was given by the Fates. He summons Prometheus to seek assurance that the prophecy will not come to pass. Dionysus, Zeus's son, seeks more godly responsibility, but is rebuffed by both his father and his father's sister-wife Hera; he spitefully steals Zeus's watch. The mortal Eurydice ("Riddy") meets Cassandra, who tells her that today is the day on which she will leave her husband Orpheus, with whom she has fallen out of love. Riddy visits her mother, a Tacita priestess, who reminds Riddy of her prophecy. It is the same as Zeus's, although supposedly no two prophecies should ever be the same. Riddy is hit by a lorry and is killed. A heartbroken Orpheus tries to commit suicide with a pistol to his temple, but is interrupted by Dionysus who (after Orpheus accidentally shoots him) tells him of a way he can be reunited with her.
2	Episode 2	Georgi Banks-Davies	Charlie Covell	29 August 2024
Riddy's journey through the Underworld is blocked after she learns that Orpheus took from her body the traditional coin that was intended to pay her passage; without it, she will need to work for 200 years before being allowed to continue. She meets Caeneus, an Underworld handler, who has unwillingly been promoted to a diver who helps souls through the River Lethe into the Frame for release and Renewal. To Hera's disgust, Zeus has been impregnating mortal women in a vain attempt to father a child he can have a good relationship with. She turns his new lover into a bee, and demands that Zeus kills his latest child. Ignoring Prometheus's advice, Zeus decides that the mortals over whom he rules are too content with their lives, and that they need to be terrorised. Dionysus takes Orpheus to a bar known as "The Cave", where mortals compete to impress the Fates and obtain entry to the Underworld, in the hope of recovering a recently-deceased loved one. Lachesis ("Lachy") disqualifies Orpheus for having taken Riddy's coin, but later allows him through in exchange for Zeus's watch.
3	Episode 3	Georgi Banks-Davies	Charlie Covell	29 August 2024
The mortal Ariadne ("Ari") has received the same prophecy as Zeus. She helps her father President Minos of Krete to investigate the desecration of the monument. Minos interrogates six of the seven implicated Trojans, threatening that the Minotaur will kill them all unless their leader, Astyanax ("Nax"), surrenders. Through Ari's bodyguard and friend (and Nax's lover) Theseus, Ari learns that Nax is willing to do so to save the others. She asks her father as a birthday gift to pardon and release the seven, and he promises to do so. But Zeus is angered, and instructs his brother Poseidon to remind Minos of his duty to obey the gods. He capitulates and re-imprisons the seven. After allowing the Minotaur to kill them, Minos has their bodies publicly hung on the monument. The Furies visit a heartbroken Ariadne, saying that they want to talk about her twin brother Glaucus. Ari has always been traumatised by the knowledge that when she was a baby she had accidentally suffocated Glaucus after rolling on top of him in her sleep.
4	Episode 4	Runyararo Mapfumo	Charlie Covell	29 August 2024
In a flashback, we learn that Prometheus had laid the foundation of his plan many years earlier, as lover of the mortal Charon. Having persuaded Charon to swear to look out for and protect someone with a specific cross-like mark, he promptly kills him. In the Underworld, Charon becomes a ferryman, accompanying the deceased over the River Styx. When Orpheus arrives with fellow Cave contestant Anatole, Charon agrees to take them across. However, Charon stops midstream, announces that he can only take one person, and suggests that the two should fight it out. Charon eventually spots the mark on Orpheus's hand, then throws Anatole overboard. Flushed with success in getting Orpheus through, Dionysus boasts of his exploits to Poseidon. Poseidon is horrified and warns that Zeus will destroy him if he learns what has happened. In an attempt to calm his father, Dionysus procures a replica watch and gives him that; it seems to help. Meanwhile, Hades, god in charge of the Underworld, and his wife Persephone, are concerned that a soul has escaped. Riddy is recruited as a diver, and she and Caeneus develop a mutual attraction. They watch as the escaped soul, who turns out to be Nax, is re-captured. Opening a trap door, Riddy and Caeneus enter 'The Nothing', a dark cavern full of the petrified bodies of those who had supposedly gone through the Frame to be Renewed.
5	Episode 5	Georgi Banks-Davies	Charlie Covell	29 August 2024
Following on from the end of episode 3, the Furies show Ari a video revealing details of her father's past. She sees him being given the presidency by Poseidon, who instructs him that he must father an heir. This presents Minos with a difficulty, as his own prophecy states "Your end begins in the marital bed. The first child to draw breath will kill you dead." Poseidon's solution is to arrange for Minos to father twins, and for the first-born to be killed. When the time comes, Minos instructs Daedalus, whom he is holding captive, to kill Glaucus. Having blamed herself all her life for her elder twin's death, Ari is horrified and initially refuses to accept it. However, after speaking to Daedalus and questioning her father, she learns that not only was the video accurate, but that in fact Glaucus is not dead. He has been kept locked up by Daedalus in the Labyrinth, and has become the creature known as the Minotaur. Back in The Nothing, Riddy and Caeneus watch as Hades takes Nax's soul. Orpheus reaches the far shore of the Styx, ready to journey on through the Underworld.
6	Episode 6	Runyararo Mapfumo	Georgia Christou	29 August 2024
While Orpheus is forced to wander on through a burning Underworld desert in his efforts to reach Riddy, Riddy herself sleeps with Caeneus and learns that his prophecy is the same as hers. Realising that souls who go through the Frame actually end up in The Nothing, the pair resolve to prevent any more from passing. Zeus has set up the Frame not for Renewal, as people have been told, but as a way of harvesting souls. These become the source of the Meander fountain, the water of which is the basis of the gods' immortality. Persephone and Hades tell Zeus that the Underworld has become over-full, causing the Frame to fail, and that a proper Renewals scheme needs to be started. Zeus's own actions are effectively making the prophecy come true. Zeus refuses to listen, and mulls over a new plan to avert disaster: he could destroy the Fates themselves, and with them, he hopes, the prophecy. But then he has another idea. If he can get Minos to defy his personal prophecy by killing his first-born, Glaucus/the Minotaur, that should prove that Zeus can overcome his own. Back in the Underworld, Orpheus at last reaches Riddy, who is not overjoyed to see him.
7	Episode 7	Runyararo Mapfumo	Charlie Covell	29 August 2024
Riddy is reluctant to return to the living world with Orpheus. Hades decides that both must stay, but without telling him Persephone makes her own plans to send them back. This is all part of Prometheus's scheme to bring Zeus down, a scheme that she fully supports. On Olympus, Zeus gathers his family together, and sits them down in front of the TV to watch Minos defying his prophecy, as it happens. Minos releases the Minotaur and enters the Labyrinth armed with a knife that the gods have provided. But Ari unexpectedly makes an appearance; she has persuaded Daedalus to allow her in to talk to her twin brother. She has just managed to calm him when Minos approaches, and a fight ensues. Minos stabs and kills Glaucus, and the watching Zeus rejoices. But Ari has realised now the depth of her father's lies, as well as her own place in his prophecy, that his first child to draw breath would be the end of him. Although Ari had been the second-born twin, she had come into the world screaming, while her brother had been born blue and silent. She plunges the knife into her father, fulfilling his prophecy.
8	Episode 8	Georgi Banks-Davies	Charlie Covell	29 August 2024
Zeus has a bad dream about cutting his finger and bleeding, as if he were a mortal. Increasingly paranoid, he returns to an idea he considered in episode 6, and he destroys the Fates. As Lachy burns, she returns Zeus's watch, disclosing that she was given it by Dionysus. Zeus realises that he has been lied to, and calls a family meeting to teach everyone a lesson. He announces that he will be taking personal control of everything, and that since the family have taken their immortality for granted he will be rationing the Meander water. When Riddy and Orpheus reach the living world once more, they part company. Riddy re-encounters Cassandra, who tells her that she is now a prophet, and that she must track down Ari and set the living free, as Caeneus (who now has the ability to Renew souls) will do for the dead. Ari, meanwhile, has taken on her father's old role as President of Krete. Prometheus is freed from his cliffside shackles by the Fates, who apparently still exist in incorporeal form, and is transported to Mount Olympus. When Zeus arrives, he finds Prometheus sitting on his throne. The Meander fountain stops flowing. Unable any longer to exercise his godly powers, Zeus notices that he has a cut on his finger, and that it is bleeding. Hera calls one of her children and tells them to "gather the troops". Ari strikes a deal with the Trojans against the gods.

== Production ==
=== Development ===
Netflix commissioned Kaos as an eight-part one hour series produced by Sister Pictures. Charlie Covell served as the creator and executive producer. Nina Lederman of All3Media alongside Tanya Seghatchian and John Woodward of Brightstar joined Charlie Covell as co-executive producer. It was announced that Katie Carpenter would serve as the series producer, with Harry Munday and Michael Eagle-Hodgson producing, and Georgi Banks Davies confirmed to be the lead director and co-executive producer. Runyararo Mapfumo would direct the second block of the series. On 13 July 2022, Georgia Christou was announced as the writer for episode 6. In October 2024, the show was cancelled after its first season.

=== Casting ===
On 27 May 2022, Aurora Perrineau was cast as Riddy, one of the main leads in the series. On 29 June 2022, more cast members were revealed, as Janet McTeer (Hera), David Thewlis (Hades), Nabhaan Rizwan (Dionysus), Cliff Curtis (Poseidon), Killian Scott (Orpheus), Leila Farzad (Ari), and Misia Butler (Caeneus) joined the series. Other cast members are Rakie Ayola as Persephone, Stanley Townsend as President Minos and Stephen Dillane as Prometheus. Additionally, Billie Piper joined the cast in a minor role. On 13 July 2022, Jeff Goldblum was cast as Zeus, replacing Hugh Grant, as the latter had to pull out due to date availability issues. On 22 August 2022, Debi Mazar joined the cast as the reimagined version of Medusa.

=== Filming ===
The start of filming in Spain and Italy was reported on 22 August 2022. The gardens of Zeus and Hera's palace were filmed at the Villa d'Este in Tivoli, Italy. Many scenes were filmed around Málaga, Spain, and the large semicircular square where several outdoor scenes were filmed was the Plaza de España, Seville. Filming also took place at locations in Almería, Madrid, and Cádiz.

== Release ==
The series was released on Netflix on 29 August 2024.

=== Marketing ===
The first teaser video for the series, showcasing Goldblum, was uploaded on YouTube on 19 March 2024.

== Reception ==
On the review aggregator website Rotten Tomatoes, 74% of 46 critics' reviews are positive, with an average rating of 6.6/10. Metacritic, which uses a weighted average, assigned the series a score of 70 out of 100, based on 22 critics, indicating "generally favorable" reviews.
