= First Day (TV series) =

- First Day title card
- Genre: Drama
- Written by: Julie Kalceff
- Directed by: Julie Kalceff
- Starring: Evie MacDonald
- Composer: Michael Lira
- Country of origin: Australia
- Original language: English
- No. of series: 2
- No. of episodes: 8

Production
- Executive producers: Jan Stradling; Bernadette O'Mahony
- Producers: Kirsty Stark; Kate Croser; Kate Butler
- Cinematography: Meg White (Season 1); Anna Howard (Season 2)
- Editor: Christine Cheung
- Camera setup: Single-camera
- Running time: 24 minutes
- Production companies: Epic Films; Kojo Entertainment; Screen Australia

Original release
- Network: ABC Me
- Release: 30 March 2020 – 3 April 2022

First Day is an Australian drama television series which premiered on ABC Me on 30 March 2020. The series originated as a short film of the same title which aired in 2017. The series, written and directed by Julie Kalceff, stars Evie MacDonald as twelve-year-old transgender girl Hannah Bradford, as she adjusts to high school at the start of a new year. The full series won a string of awards across 2020 and 2021, including a GLAAD Media Award and an International Emmy Kids Award. It also gained attention in the United States following its release on Hulu. Both the series and the film have received a positive reception for its representation of diversity in transgender children.

The series was filmed in Adelaide, South Australia including on location at Marryatville High School and Mercedes College. The series was produced by Epic Films and Kojo Entertainment, in association with the South Australian Film Corporation and the Australian Children's Television Foundation (ACTF).

== Premise ==
Hannah Bradford is a twelve-year-old transgender girl beginning her journey towards the end of primary school, and the beginning of high school. She must learn how to navigate her new environment, while also dealing with the social pressures of finding where she belongs while transitioning. As she begins high school, she presents herself as female in public for the first time. Hannah befriends Olivia, Jasmine and Natalie, whom she doesn't immediately disclose her gender identity to. However, she struggles with being bullied by Isabella, a classmate from her primary school, who threatens to reveal her secret, and taunts her with her previous name. Hannah lives with her mother, Amanda; and her father, Steve, who try to protect her from the harm of external situations, which sometimes leads to disagreement and conflict. When her trans identity spreads around the school, Olivia and Natalie support her but Jasmine ends their friendship.

In the second series, Hannah returns to school for a new year and is inspired to run for class captain, competing against Jasmine. She is forced to deal with microaggressions and hate speech as she learns that people still label her as the "transgender kid". Hannah starts to feel lost and ostracised from her friends and peers; in searching for a place to fit in and belong, she begins a social club for LGBTQIA+ students. She also becomes concerned for her friend Josh, who is apprehensive about returning to school after he reveals his gender identity. Hannah also considers dating when she bonds with classmate Billy.

== Cast and characters ==
=== Featuring ===
- Evie Macdonald as Hannah Bradford, a confident twelve year old transgender girl, who has interests in taekwondo

=== Other cast ===
- Joanne Hunt as Amanda Bradford, Hannah's mother
- Brenna Harding as Ms. Fraser, Hannah's high school Mathematics and home room teacher
- Anthony Brandon Wong as Mr. Nguyen (series 1), the principal of Hillview High School
- Pete Ferris as Mr. Reynolds (series 2), the new principal of Hillview High School
- Mark Saturno as Steve Bradford, Hannah's father
- Ethan Gifford as Jack Bradford, Hannah's older brother
- Elena Liu as Olivia, a friend of Hannah's who she bonds with on her first day of high school
- Nandini Rajagopal as Natalie, a new friend of Hannah's
- Arwen Diamond as Jasmine, a new friend of Hannah's, who later decides to end their friendship
- Isabel Burmester as Isabella, a former primary school student who recognises Hannah
- Jake Childs as Josh, initially known as Sarah, a classmate of Hannah's who comes out to her as a transgender boy
- Maddy Miotti as Savannah, a friend of Isabella's who supports and joins in on bullying Hannah
- Jackson Evans as Billy, a classmate of Hannah's who she starts to develop feelings for
- Maiah Stewardson as Sam (series 2), an older student who assists Hannah by attending her Pride club
- Thai Hoa (Steven) Nguyen as Lachlan (series 2), an older student, friends with Sam, who also attends the Pride club
- Joe Bird as Kevin (series 2), a classmate of Hannah's who Hannah speaks to about class captain
- Olivia Jensen as Amber (series 2), the new girlfriend of Billy, which makes Hannah jealous
- Zoe O'Callaghan as Avery (series 2), a classmate of Hannah's who Hannah speaks to about class captain
- Jay Hines as Bobbie (series 2), a non-binary pupil who leads a petition to change the school uniform policy with Hannah
- Isabeau Bottroff as Kylie (series 2), a classmate of Hannah's who is reluctant about the new uniform petition

== Production ==
First Day was first commissioned in 2017 as a stand-alone episode. The one-off drama was created through Screen Australia and ABC Children's Girls Initiative, which was created as a funding program to strengthen Australian female producers. The short film screened as part of International Day of the Girl. Evie Macdonald starred in the special as Hannah Bradford, and became the first transgender actor to star in the lead role of an Australian scripted television drama. Macdonald was twelve years old at the time of filming and had not previously acted. Julie Kalceff wrote and directed the project. Kalceff was motivated to increase visibility of the LGBTQIA+ community through telling a story about a transgender teenager, after being inspired by a family member who was transitioning. She believed it was important to have a transgender girl play Hannah, which resulted in MacDonald's casting, and stated that if they couldn't find the right actor, the film wouldn't have been made.

In June 2019, a miniseries based on the original short film was commissioned by the Australian Broadcasting Corporation to air on ABC Me. Kalceff and producer Kirsty Stark had pitched a series to the ABC, and it took 18 months to be ordered. The series was financed through the South Australian Film Corporation and the Australian Children's Television Foundation (ACTF). Also titled First Day, Macdonald and the original creative team were named to return to the production, which would be told as a four-part series. Kalceff, the series creator, was attached to the project as the writer and director, along with producers Kirsty Stark, Kate Croser, and co-producer Kate Butler. The series was filmed in Adelaide and led by Kalceff, who served as the writer and director for all episodes. Kalceff wanted to empower Macdonald to tell her story as a transgender girl. Filming began in July 2019 in South Australia, with a local crew. Kalceff stated she was excited to tell the original story in more detail. The series was produced by Epic Films in association with Kojo Entertainment, and international sales of the series were handled by ACTF. The full series premiered on 30 March 2020 on ABC Me.

It received principal development and production funding from the Australian Government and Screen Australia. Jan Stradling from the ABC and Bernadette O'Mahony from ACTF served as the executive producers of the series.

Overriding themes include the focus on identity and belonging, and the exploration of transgender rights.

In November 2020, the ACTF invested funding in a second series of First Day, to consist of an additional four episodes. The second series was officially ordered in May 2021, with the new episodes to depict Hannah's second year at high school. Production again took place in Adelaide, and filming concluded on 4 August 2021. International broadcaster Hulu joined the production as a co-investing partner. The second series premiered on ABC Me on 31 March 2022. Kalceff wanted to continue Hannah's story and show the character dealing with regular teenage issues, while also addressing microaggressions towards transgender identity. Upon the release of the second series, Kalceff said that no further episodes would be made, due to the ages of the cast.

Alice Maio Mackay worked on the production crew of the series. In a 2024 interview, she described a "transphobic (and) vile" atmosphere on set of a "high profile TV show about a trans girl".

== Episodes ==
Series	Episodes	Originally released	
Series	Episodes	First released	Last released
Short film		11 October 2017	
1	4	30 March 2020	2 April 2020
2	4	31 March 2022	3 April 2022

=== Short film (2017) ===
Title	Directed by	Written by	Original release date
"First Day"	Julie Kalceff	Julie Kalceff	11 October 2017
Hannah finishes primary school and anxiously begins high school, presenting herself for the first time as female. She meets the principal of the Hillview High School, Mr. Nguyen, who is inclusive of Hannah's needs, but informs her that she must initially use the sick bay toilets while at school. On her final day of primary school, Hannah is confronted by Isabella, who teases her. On the first day, Hannah meets Olivia, who she develops an immediate bond with. She is upset to encounter Isabella, who recognises her and continues to bully her. However, Hannah recognises that Isabella is also experiencing her own struggles, and offers her a new start at a friendship.

=== Series 1 (2020) ===
No. overall	No. in series	Title	Directed by	Written by	Original release date
1	1	"Episode One"	Julie Kalceff	Julie Kalceff	30 March 2020
Hannah and her mother, Amanda, meet with Mr. Nguyen, the principal of Hillview High School, to discuss Hannah's enrolment. He vocalises his intent to be inclusive of her gender diversity, but informs her that she must initially use the sick bay toilet instead of the female toilet. Before her first day, Hannah's anxieties grow, and she worries that other students may discover that she is transgender. When she arrives at school, Hannah is overwhelmed; before she meets Olivia, who helps her search for her class. Hannah is comforted when she realises she has found friends in Olivia, Jasmine and Natalie. She is relieved when her classmates accept her excuse for using the sick bay toilets. While exiting the toilet, Hannah is seen by Isabella, a former bully from her primary school, who recognises her and is surprised by her new appearance. Isabella threatens to reveal Hannah's secret.
2	2	"Episode Two"	Julie Kalceff	Julie Kalceff	31 March 2020
Hannah confides in Mr. Nguyen about her concerns surrounding Isabella, who she continues to be threatened by. Hannah is angered when her parents won't allow her to attend a sleepover at Jasmine's house, as her friends don't know that she is transgender. She attends the party, but is embarrassed when she has to leave rather than stay overnight. The next day, Hannah invites Olivia to her house and tells her that she is transgender. Olivia promises not to reveal Hannah's secret, but feels strongly that she should be allowed to use the female toilets at school. Hannah fears that her parents won't let her attend the school camp, so chooses not to inform them about it. At school, a message is circulated online revealing Hannah's secret in a distasteful manner.
3	3	"Episode Three"	Julie Kalceff	Julie Kalceff	1 April 2020
Hannah is forced to deal with the public outing of her gender identity on social media. She is hesitant to return to school, but decides to face her fears after receiving support from her classmates and friends. Jasmine expresses her resentment about Hannah not disclosing her private information and decides to end their friendship. Isabella pleads with Hannah to tell Mr. Nguyen that she didn't post the message online, but she also continues to bully Hannah. Mr. Nguyen allows Hannah to use the girl's toilets upon her return before Hannah discovers hate speech graffitied in the stalls. After speaking with her brother, Hannah decides to attend the school camp and ask her parents.
4	4	"Episode Four"	Julie Kalceff	Julie Kalceff	2 April 2020
Hannah and her classmates depart for school camp. Once they arrive, Hannah's friends throw her a surprise birthday party in the dorm. Hannah shares stories about her life and her past with her classmates around the campfire, and Sarah is inspired. Sarah confides in Hannah about her own gender identity, and Hannah vows to help her. Isabella continues to bully Hannah, until Hannah realises that she isn't afraid of her anymore. Hannah asserts that she is proud of her identity, and no longer has anything to hide. Hannah faces her fears about being judged and goes swimming with her friends.

=== Series 2 (2022) ===
No. overall	No. in series	Title	Directed by	Written by	Original release date
5	1	"Episode Five"	Julie Kalceff	Julie Kalceff	31 March 2022
On her first day of a new school grade, Hannah is eager to start the year feeling comfortable living as her true self, and decides to run for class captain for her home room. She prepares to conquer her fear of public speaking, but is intimidated by her classmate Jasmine, who fulfilled the role the previous year. While writing her speech, Hannah interacts with her peers but discovers that they are still labelling her as a "transgender kid", which upsets her. She listens to some inspiring speeches by female leaders and decides to orientate her speech around making change and being there to support her classmates. Hannah also learns that her friend Billy is dating Amber, and she bonds with him when they become partners in their foods class. Hannah visits her friend Josh (previously known as Sarah), who is apprehensive about returning to school and revealing his gender identity, and becomes concerned for him.
6	2	"Episode Six"	Julie Kalceff	Julie Kalceff & Eloise Brook	1 April 2022
Jasmine is elected the class captain, but Hannah suspects she didn't receive votes due to being transgender. Hannah begins to feel ostracised when she isn't invited to Jasmine's party, and decides to begin a social club for LGBTQI+ students. She tries to convince Josh to join, but he is still uneager to return to school. Hannah is devastated when no one attends her club's first meeting. She begins to feel distant from Natalie and Olivia, and continues to bond with Billy in her foods class. Olivia tricks Hannah into attending the party, but Jasmine orders her to leave. Hannah has an argument with Olivia, and laments the fact that everything has changed.
7	3	"Episode Seven"	Julie Kalceff	Julie Kalceff	2 April 2022
Hannah confronts Olivia about her actions, feeling as if their trust has been broken, and believes Jasmine has taken Olivia's side of the argument; she stops spending time with both of them. Outside of school, Hannah realises that Josh is still not comfortable in leaving the house. Hannah tries to convince some older students to attend her pride club, and finds an ally in Sam and her friends, which leads to an increase in attendees. Hannah continues to face microaggressions at school, and helps a non-binary member of the group in trying to change school uniform policy. After Billy and Amber break up, Hannah tries to prepare herself for dating and seeks advice from her group. Billy eventually asks Hannah out, but she is subjected to hate speech, which leads her to seek out Olivia, distraught.
8	4	"Episode Eight"	Julie Kalceff	Julie Kalceff & Martine Delaney	3 April 2022
Hannah and Olivia reunite, and Olivia shares feelings she has about regular microaggressions she experiences because of her Asian background. Olivia tells Hannah that she feels excluded from her pride club, which leads to the expansion of the club to include allies of the LGBT community. Hannah speaks at assembly to announce this and rally for support of her new uniform policy; she receives support from many of her peers including Jasmine and former bully Isabella. Mr. Reynolds informs Hannah that the uniform policy has passed. Josh agrees to join Hannah at her taekwondo class, and finally decides to re-enrol in school for the next term. Olivia and Natalie convince Hannah to attend the school dance and go along with Billy. Hannah confides in her mother about her dating fears, but ultimately decides to commit and shares her feelings with Billy.

== Release ==
In September 2020, the series began streaming on Hulu in the United States and began airing on CBBC in the United Kingdom. In March 2021, the series launched on CBC Gem in Canada.

== Awards and nominations ==
List of awards and nominations received by First Day short film
Award	Year	Recipient(s) and nominee(s)	Category	Result	Ref.
FAN Chile Audiovisual Festival for Kids	2018	First Day	Best Children's Series (Fiction)	Won	
Mardi Gras Film Festival	2018	First Day	Best Screenplay and Audience Award	Won	
MIPCOM Diversify TV Excellence Awards	2018	First Day	Kids' Programming	Won	
Prix Jeunesse International Children's Television Festival	2018	First Day	Gender Equity Prize	Won	

List of awards and nominations received by First Day series
Award	Year	Recipient(s) and nominee(s)	Category	Result	Ref.
AACTA Awards	2020	First Day	Best Children's Program	Nominated	
Banff World Media Festival Rockie Awards	2021	First Day	Live Action: Children (0–10)	Won	
Children's and Family Emmy Awards	2022	First Day (Note: The series was listed under Hulu as a distributor.)	Outstanding Young Teen Series	Nominated	
GLAAD Media Award	2021	First Day (Note: The series was listed under Hulu as a distributor.)	Outstanding Kids & Family Programming	Won (Tied) (Note: First Day was tied with She-Ra and the Princesses of Power.)	
International Emmy Kids Awards	2021	First Day	Kids: Live-Action	Won	
Kidscreen Awards	2021	First Day	Kids Programming – Best Live-Action Series	Won	
Kidscreen Awards	2023	First Day (for Series 2)	Kids Programming – Best Live-Action Series	Nominated	
Rose d'Or Awards	2020	First Day	Children and Youth	Won	
Screen Producers Australia Awards	2022	First Day	Children's Series Production of the Year	Pending	

== Reception ==
The short film won a diversity award from MIPCOM, who stated that the prize was awarded for "promoting understanding and acceptance" of transgender children who are transitioning, which was depicted through the character of Hannah beginning high school.

Reviewing the full series in 2020, David Knox of TV Tonight described it as "the most inclusive, most authentic kid's drama since Dance Academy". He praised Kalceff for her delicate handling of conflict in the series, as well as MacDonald for the nuance in her performance. Knox stated that he would have liked to see the series explore issues in further detail.
