= Dallas Malloy =

American actor and boxer

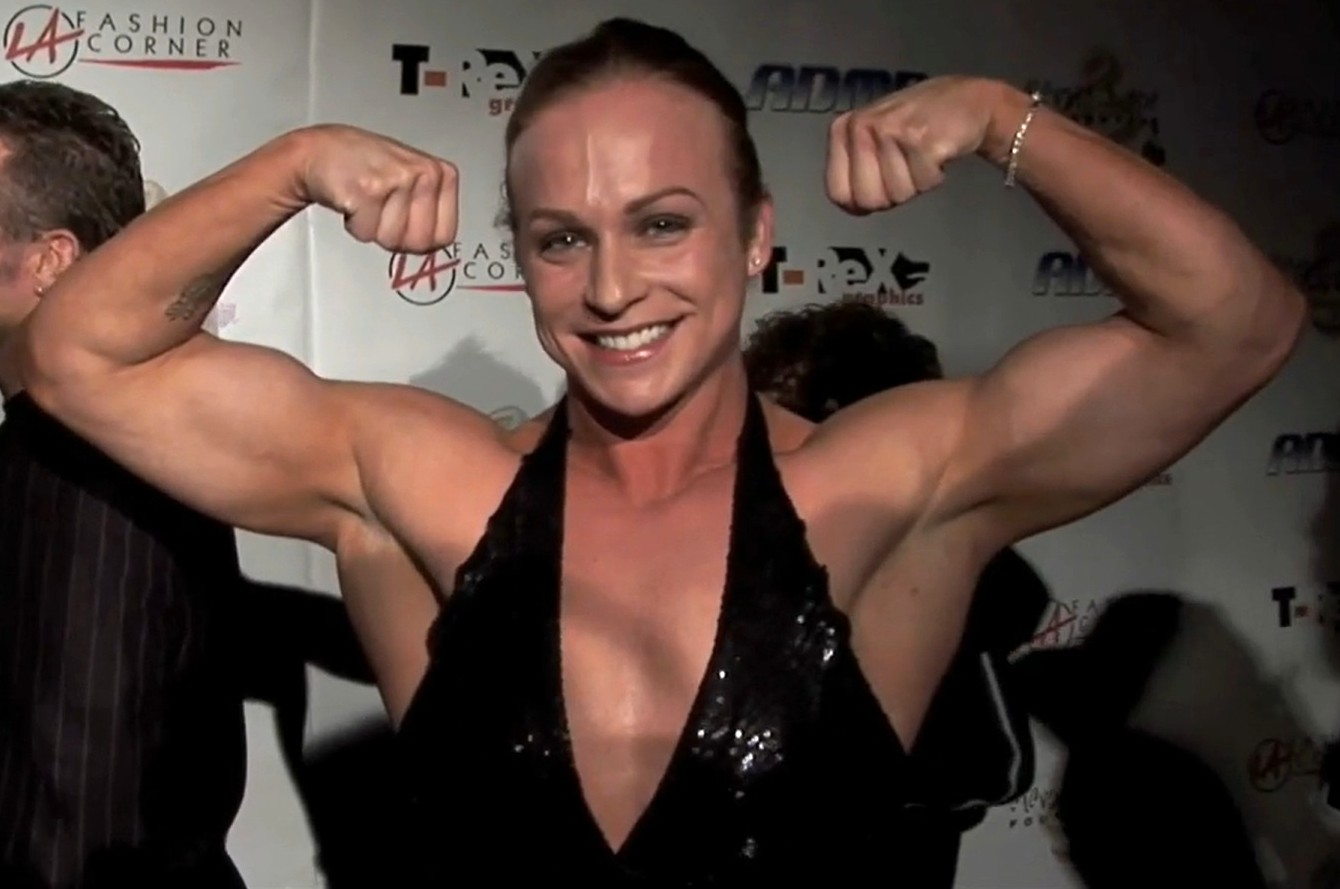
Malloy in 2009

Dallas Malloy is known for being a boxer who defeated Heather Poyner in the United States’ first sanctioned amateur boxing match between two female boxers.

== Boxing ==
Malloy was denied an application by USA Boxing due to being female. She sued and U.S. District Judge Barbara Rothstein allowed her to box by granting a preliminary injunction. In October 1993, Malloy defeated Heather Poyner in the United States’ first sanctioned amateur boxing match between two female boxers. USA Boxing lifted its ban on women's boxing later in 1993.

== Appearance in Jerry Maguire ==
Malloy portrayed herself in the opening scene of Jerry Maguire, in which she appeared as Tom Cruise talked about her.

== Personal life ==
Malloy was raised in Bellingham, Washington. She is a recovering alcoholic and drug addict; she has stayed sober since January 14, 1997. In 1999 she stopped smoking.
