= Jared Jussim =

American lawyer

Jared Jussim (born 1935) is an American lawyer. He was deputy general counsel and executive vice president of the intellectual property department of Sony Pictures Entertainment Inc. until 2011. Jussim attended City College of the City University of New York, graduating in 1958, and Harvard Law School, graduating in 1961 and is admitted to the bar in California and New York.

His professional activities include participation in New York State Bar Association's committee on legislation, on which he held the position of chairman from 1986 to 1990. Jussim appeared in TriStar Pictures' Jerry Maguire in 1996 as Dicky Fox, mentor to Tom Cruise's Jerry Maguire. TriStar was a subsidiary of Columbia Pictures, which was renamed Sony Pictures Entertainment in 1991.

Cameron Crowe had initially asked director Billy Wilder to play the role of Dicky Fox but Wilder told him to get an actor. Jussim, who had no prior acting experience, was cast for the role after walking into a production meeting with Crowe and James L. Brooks. Jussim was asked to say one line and was thereafter selected.

As of 2020, he is an adjunct professor at Southwestern Law School.

== Filmography ==
Year	Title	Role	Notes
1996	Jerry Maguire	Dicky Fox	
