= Erica Sorgi =

Personal information
- Full name: Erica Marie Sorgi
- Nickname: "Eastah"
- National team: USA
- Born: July 2, 1982 (age 43) Lowell, Massachusetts
- Education: Stanford University

Sport
- Sport: Diving
- Event(s): 1 m, 3 m, Platform
- Coached by: Li Hongping

Erica Sorgi (born July 2, 1982 in Lowell, Massachusetts) is considered one of the finest women's youth divers in United States history.

Sorgi was awarded her first two gold medals at the 1995 JO National Championship after finishing as a runner up the year prior in the 13 and under age group.

In 1996, she became the youngest diver to win the Austin up on the 3 m springboard event at the All-American Diving Invitational. In June at the Waldkraiburg Youth International Diving Competition in Germany, she won gold medals in the 1 m, 3 m, and platform events. Later that summer, she won three titles in the 14-15 age group category at the Junior National Championships. At the U.S. Senior National Championships, she became the youngest diver in United States history, at age 14, to win the 3 meter event.

In 1997, Sorgi represented the United States at the Junior World Championships in Malaysia where she won her first World Championship title on the platform event. She also earned a bronze in both the 1 m and 3 m springboard events. Along with her second Senior National title in the 1 m event that year, she qualified for the World Aquatics Championships and World Trials the following year.

In 1998, Sorgi competed in Perth, Australia at the World Aquatic Championships finishing 15th on 3 m and 10th on 1 m. That year, after winning two more Senior National championships (platform, 3 m synchro), Sorgi represented the United States at the Goodwill Games in New York.

After earning two more Junior National titles the year before, she continued with two additional titles in 1999 bringing her total to twelve Junior National Championships. On the senior level, she won three Senior National titles.

Sorgi was later inducted into the prestigious Mission Viejo Nadadores Diving Hall of Fame. Although Sorgi never competed in the Olympics, she holds several records in Nadadore history: the most Junior National Championships (12), the only High School All-American to win a High School National Championship, and be recognized by USA Diving as Sportswoman of the year twice (1997 & 1999).
