= GLAAD Media Award for Outstanding Independent Journalism =

Annual US journalism award

The GLAAD Media Award for Outstanding Independent Journalism is an annual award that honors blogs and independent online journalism for excellence in the depiction of LGBT (lesbian, gay, bisexual, and transgender) news and commentary. It is one of several categories of the annual GLAAD Media Awards, which are presented by GLAAD—an American non-governmental media monitoring organization founded in 1985—at ceremonies in New York City and Los Angeles between March and May.

The award was first given in 2011 as the GLAAD Media Award for Outstanding Blog at the 22nd Awards to Joe Jervis, writer of Joe.My.God. The award was renamed for the 36th GLAAD Media Awards in 2025.

== Winners and nominations ==
Table key
‡	Indicates the winner

=== 2010s ===
Award year	Publication	Author/editor	Ref(s).
2011 (22nd)	Joe. My. God. ‡	Joe Jervis	
2011 (22nd)	The Bilerico Project	various	
2011 (22nd)	Blabbeando	Andrés Duque	
2011 (22nd)	Pam's House Blend	Pam Spaulding	
2011 (22nd)	Rod 2.0	Rod McCollum	
2012 (23rd)	(tie) Mombian‡	Dana Rudolph	
2012 (23rd)	(tie) Towleroad‡	Andy Towle	
2012 (23rd)	The Bilerico Project	various	
2012 (23rd)	The New Civil Rights Movement	David Badash	
2012 (23rd)	Rod 2.0	Rod McCollum	
2013 (24th)	Rod 2.0‡	Rod McCollum	
2013 (24th)	Autostraddle	Riese Bernard, Alexandra Vega	
2013 (24th)	blac(k)ademic	various	
2013 (24th)	The New Civil Rights Movement	David Badash	
2013 (24th)	Towleroad	Andy Towle	
2014 (25th)	The New Civil Rights Movement‡	David Badash	
2014 (25th)	Autostraddle	Riese Bernard, Alexandra Vega	
2014 (25th)	Elixher	various	
2014 (25th)	Holy Bullies and Headless Monsters	Alvin McEwen	
2014 (25th)	TransGriot	Monica Roberts	
2015 (26th)	Autostraddle‡	Riese Bernard, Alexandra Vega	
2015 (26th)	The Art of Transliness		
2015 (26th)	Box Turtle Bulletin	various	
2015 (26th)	Holy Bullies and Headless Monsters	Alvin McEwen	
2015 (26th)	My Fabulous Disease	Mark S. King	
2016 (27th)	no award given		
2017 (28th)	Holy Bullies and Headless Monsters‡	Alvin McEwen	
2017 (28th)	I'm Still Josh		
2017 (28th)	Mombian	Dana Rudolph	
2017 (28th)	My Fabulous Disease	Mark S. King	
2017 (28th)	TransGriot	Monica Roberts	
2018 (29th)	TransGriot‡	Monica Roberts	
2018 (29th)	Autostraddle	Riese Bernard, Alexandra Vega	
2018 (29th)	Gays With Kids	Brian Rosenberg & Ferd van Gameren	
2018 (29th)	My Fabulous Disease	Mark S. King	
2018 (29th)	Pittsburgh Lesbian Correspondents	Sue Kerr	
2019 (30th)	Pittsburgh Lesbian Correspondents‡	Sue Kerr	
2019 (30th)	Holy Bullies and Headless Monsters	Alvin McEwen	
2019 (30th)	Gays With Kids	Brian Rosenberg & Ferd van Gameren	
2019 (30th)	My Fabulous Disease	Mark S. King	
2019 (30th)	TransGriot	Monica Roberts	

=== 2020s ===
Award year	Publication	Author/editor	Ref(s).
2020 (31st)	My Fabulous Disease‡	Mark S. King	
2020 (31st)	Gays With Kids	Brian Rosenberg & Ferd van Gameren	
2020 (31st)	Joe. My. God.	Joe Jervis	
2020 (31st)	Pittsburgh Lesbian Correspondents	Sue Kerr	
2020 (31st)	TransGriot	Monica Roberts	
2021 (32nd)	TransGriot‡	Monica Roberts	
2021 (32nd)	Gays With Kids	Brian Rosenberg & Ferd van Gameren	
2021 (32nd)	Joe. My. God.	Joe Jervis	
2021 (32nd)	Pittsburgh Lesbian Correspondents	Sue Kerr	
2021 (32nd)	The Reckoning	Charles Stephens and Johnnie Ray Kornegay III	
2022 (33rd)	Pittsburgh Lesbian Correspondents‡	Sue Kerr	
2022 (33rd)	Holy Bullies and Headless Monsters	Alvin McEwen	
2022 (33rd)	Mombian	Dana Rudolph	
2022 (33rd)	My Fabulous Disease	Mark S. King	
2022 (33rd)	The Reckoning	Charles Stephens and Johnnie Ray Kornegay III	
2023 (34th)	Mombian‡	Dana Rudolph	
2023 (34th)	Charlotte's Web Thoughts	Charlotte Clymer	
2023 (34th)	Holy Bullies and Headless Monsters	Alvin McEwen	
2023 (34th)	My Fabulous Disease	Mark S. King	
2023 (34th)	The Reckoning	Charles Stephens and Johnnie Ray Kornegay III	
2024 (35th)	Erin in the Morning‡	Erin Reed	
2024 (35th)	Charlotte's Web Thoughts	Charlotte Clymer	
2024 (35th)	Holy Bullies and Headless Monsters	Alvin McEwen	
2024 (35th)	LawDork	Chris Geidner	
2024 (35th)	Mombian	Dana Rudolph	
2024 (35th)	Pittsburgh Lesbian Correspondents	Sue Kerr	
2024 (35th)	The Queer Review	James Kleinmann	
2024 (35th)	The Randy Report	Randy Slovacek	
2024 (35th)	The Reckoning	Charles Stephens and Johnnie Ray Kornegay III	
2024 (35th)	The Rot Spot		
2025 (36th)	The 19th	Emily Ramshaw and Amanda Zamora	
2025 (36th)	Assigned Media	Evan Urquhart	
2025 (36th)	The Buckeye Flame	Ken Schneck	
2025 (36th)	The Don Lemon Show	Don Lemon	
2025 (36th)	Erin in the Morning	Erin Reed	
2025 (36th)	Gaye Magazine	Dominic Gaye and K. Keith	
2025 (36th)	Queer News Daily	Nico Lang	
2025 (36th)	The Queer Review	James Kleinmann	
2025 (36th)	TransLash Media	various	
2025 (36th)	Under the Desk News	Vitus "V" Spehar	
2026 (37th)	Assigned Media	Evan Urquhart	
2026 (37th)	The Buckeye Flame	Ken Schneck	
2026 (37th)	Charlotte's Web Thoughts	Charlotte Clymer	
2026 (37th)	Erin in the Morning	Erin Reed	
2026 (37th)	Impact Media	Tim Chau and Michelle Andrews	
2026 (37th)	Queer Kentucky	Spencer Jenkins	
2026 (37th)	The Queer Review	James Kleinmann	
2026 (37th)	Trans News Network	various	
2026 (37th)	Under The Desk News with V Spehar	V Spehar	
2026 (37th)	Xtra Magazine	Jennifer McGuire and Angela Mullins	
