= GLAAD Media Award for Outstanding Comedy Series =

Annual US television award

- Awarded for: Excellence in depiction of the LGBT (lesbian, gay, bisexual, and transgender) community in a comedy series
- Venue: Varies
- Country: United States
- Presented by: GLAAD
- First award: April 19, 1990; 36 years ago
- Currently held by: Palm Royale (2026)

The GLAAD Media Award for Outstanding Comedy Series is an annual award that honors comedy series for excellence in the depiction of LGBT (lesbian, gay, bisexual, and transgender) characters and themes. It is one of several categories of the annual GLAAD Media Awards, which are presented by GLAAD—an American non-governmental media monitoring organization founded in 1985, formerly called the Gay & Lesbian Alliance Against Defamation—at ceremonies in New York City; Los Angeles; and San Francisco between March and June.

The award is one of the few to have been present at every ceremony since the 1st GLAAD Media Awards in 1990, where the CBS series Doctor Doctor won. For the 7th GLAAD Media Awards in 1996, the category was merged with Outstanding Drama Series to create Outstanding Television Series, but this was reverted the following year. Throughout the award's history, there have only been two instances where a tie occurred: in 1995 where NBC's Friends and ABC's Roseanne won, and again in 2011 with Fox's Glee and ABC's Modern Family winning. Animated series, such as Steven Universe and Harley Quinn, have also been nominated.

For a comedy series to be eligible, it must include at least one LGBT character in a leading, supporting, or recurring capacity. The award may be accepted by the show's producers, writers, and/or actors. Comedy series selected by GLAAD are evaluated based on four criteria: "Fair, Accurate, and Inclusive Representations" of the LGBT community, "Boldness and Originality" of the project, significant "Impact" on mainstream culture, and "Overall Quality" of the project. GLAAD monitors mainstream media to identify which comedy series will be nominated, while also issuing a Call for Entries that encourages media outlets to submit programs for consideration. Comedic programs created by and for an LGBT audience must be submitted in order to be considered for nomination, as GLAAD does not monitor such works for defamation. Winners are determined by a plurality vote by GLAAD staff and board, Shareholders Circle members, (Note: The Shareholders Circle consists of individuals who have made a donation of $1,500 or more.) as well as volunteers and affiliated individuals.

Since its inception, the award has been given to 22 comedy series. With seven wins out of nine nominations, five of which were consecutive, Will & Grace has received the award more than any other program. Both Roseanne and Transparent have won the award three times, while Doctor Doctor, Glee, Modern Family, Schitt's Creek, and Ugly Betty have won twice. With four nominations, Superstore is most nominated series without a win. The most recent recipient is HBO Max's Hacks, which was honored at the 36th GLAAD Media Awards in 2025.

== Winners and nominees ==
Table key
| ‡ | Indicates the winner |

=== 1990s ===
1990s winners and nominees
| Award year | Series | Network | Ref(s). |
|---|---|---|---|
| 1990 (1st) | Doctor Doctor ‡ | CBS | |
| 1991 (2nd) | Doctor Doctor ‡ | CBS | |
| 1992 (3rd) | Roseanne ‡ | ABC | |
| 1993 (4th) | Roseanne ‡ | ABC | |
| 1994 (5th) | Seinfeld ‡ | NBC | |
| 1995 (6th) | Friends ‡ | NBC | |
| 1995 (6th) | Roseanne ‡ | ABC | |
| 1996 (Note: In 1996, the Outstanding Comedy Series award was merged with Outstanding Drama Series to create the Outstanding Television Series category.) (7th) | NYPD Blue ‡ | ABC | |
| 1996 (7th) | Courthouse | CBS | |
| 1996 (7th) | Friends | NBC | |
| 1996 (7th) | Party of Five | Fox | |
| 1996 (7th) | Sisters | NBC | |
| 1997 (8th) | Spin City ‡ | ABC | |
| 1997 (8th) | Ellen | ABC | |
| 1997 (8th) | Friends | NBC | |
| 1997 (8th) | The Larry Sanders Show | HBO | |
| 1997 (8th) | Mad About You | NBC | |
| 1998 (9th) | Ellen ‡ | ABC | |
| 1998 (9th) | Mad About You | NBC | |
| 1998 (9th) | Spin City | ABC | |
| 1998 (9th) | Suddenly Susan | NBC | |
| 1999 (10th) | Will & Grace ‡ | NBC | |
| 1999 (10th) | The Drew Carey Show | ABC | |
| 1999 (10th) | Ellen | ABC | |
| 1999 (10th) | Spin City | ABC | |
| 1999 (10th) | Suddenly Susan | NBC | |

=== 2000s ===
2000s winners and nominees
| Award year | Series | Network | Ref(s). |
|---|---|---|---|
| 2000 (11th) | Will & Grace ‡ | NBC | |
| 2000 (11th) | Action | Fox | |
| 2000 (11th) | Los Beltrán | Telemundo | |
| 2000 (11th) | Oh, Grow Up | ABC | |
| 2000 (11th) | Sex and the City | HBO | |
| 2001 (12th) | Will & Grace ‡ | NBC | |
| 2001 (12th) | Beggars and Choosers | Showtime | |
| 2001 (12th) | Los Beltrán | Telemundo | |
| 2001 (12th) | Popular | The WB | |
| 2002 (13th) | Will & Grace ‡ | NBC | |
| 2002 (13th) | The Ellen Show | CBS | |
| 2002 (13th) | Sex and the City | HBO | |
| 2002 (13th) | Some of My Best Friends | CBS | |
| 2003 (14th) | Will & Grace ‡ | NBC | |
| 2003 (14th) | Sex and the City | HBO | |
| 2004 (15th) | Sex and the City ‡ | HBO | |
| 2004 (15th) | It's All Relative | ABC | |
| 2004 (15th) | Oliver Beene | Fox | |
| 2004 (15th) | Reno 911! | Comedy Central | |
| 2004 (15th) | Will & Grace | NBC | |
| 2005 (16th) | Will & Grace ‡ | NBC | |
| 2006 (17th) | Will & Grace ‡ | NBC | |
| 2006 (17th) | Out of Practice | CBS | |
| 2006 (17th) | Shameless | BBC America | |
| 2007 (18th) | Ugly Betty ‡ | ABC | |
| 2007 (18th) | Desperate Housewives | ABC | |
| 2007 (18th) | The Office | NBC | |
| 2007 (18th) | So Notorious | VH1 | |
| 2008 (19th) | Ugly Betty ‡ | ABC | |
| 2008 (19th) | Desperate Housewives | ABC | |
| 2008 (19th) | Exes and Ohs | Logo | |
| 2008 (19th) | The Sarah Silverman Program | Comedy Central | |
| 2008 (19th) | The War at Home | Fox | |
| 2009 (20th) | Desperate Housewives ‡ | ABC | |
| 2009 (20th) | Greek | ABC Family | |
| 2009 (20th) | Reaper | The CW | |
| 2009 (20th) | Skins | BBC America | |
| 2009 (20th) | Ugly Betty | ABC | |

=== 2010s ===
2010s winners and nominees
| Award year | Series | Network | Ref(s). |
|---|---|---|---|
| 2010 (21st) | Glee ‡ | Fox | |
| 2010 (21st) | Beautiful People | BBC America | |
| 2010 (21st) | Greek | ABC Family | |
| 2010 (21st) | Modern Family | ABC | |
| 2010 (21st) | United States of Tara | Showtime | |
| 2011 (22nd) | Glee ‡ | Fox | |
| 2011 (22nd) | Modern Family ‡ | ABC | |
| 2011 (22nd) | Greek | ABC Family | |
| 2011 (22nd) | Nurse Jackie | Showtime | |
| 2011 (22nd) | United States of Tara | Showtime | |
| 2012 (23rd) | Modern Family ‡ | ABC | |
| 2012 (23rd) | The Big C | Showtime | |
| 2012 (23rd) | Exes and Ohs | Logo | |
| 2012 (23rd) | Glee | Fox | |
| 2012 (23rd) | Happy Endings | ABC | |
| 2013 (24th) | The New Normal ‡ | NBC | |
| 2013 (24th) | Glee | Fox | |
| 2013 (24th) | Go On | NBC | |
| 2013 (24th) | Happy Endings | ABC | |
| 2013 (24th) | Modern Family | ABC | |
| 2014 (25th) | Orange Is the New Black ‡ | Netflix | |
| 2014 (25th) | Brooklyn Nine-Nine | Fox | |
| 2014 (25th) | Glee | Fox | |
| 2014 (25th) | Modern Family | ABC | |
| 2014 (25th) | Please Like Me | Pivot | |
| 2015 (26th) | Transparent ‡ | Amazon | |
| 2015 (26th) | Brooklyn Nine-Nine | Fox | |
| 2015 (26th) | Faking It | MTV | |
| 2015 (26th) | Glee | Fox | |
| 2015 (26th) | Looking | HBO | |
| 2015 (26th) | Modern Family | ABC | |
| 2015 (26th) | Orange Is the New Black | Netflix | |
| 2015 (26th) | Please Like Me | Pivot | |
| 2015 (26th) | Sirens | USA | |
| 2015 (26th) | Vicious | PBS | |
| 2016 (27th) | Transparent ‡ | Amazon | |
| 2016 (27th) | Brooklyn Nine-Nine | Fox | |
| 2016 (27th) | Faking It | MTV | |
| 2016 (27th) | Grace and Frankie | Netflix | |
| 2016 (27th) | Looking | HBO | |
| 2016 (27th) | Modern Family | ABC | |
| 2016 (27th) | Master of None | Netflix | |
| 2016 (27th) | Orange Is the New Black | Netflix | |
| 2016 (27th) | Please Like Me | Pivot | |
| 2016 (27th) | Vicious | PBS | |
| 2017 (28th) | Transparent ‡ | Amazon | |
| 2017 (28th) | Brooklyn Nine-Nine | Fox | |
| 2017 (28th) | Crazy Ex-Girlfriend | The CW | |
| 2017 (28th) | Grace and Frankie | Netflix | |
| 2017 (28th) | Modern Family | ABC | |
| 2017 (28th) | One Mississippi | Amazon | |
| 2017 (28th) | The Real O'Neals | ABC | |
| 2017 (28th) | Steven Universe | Cartoon Network | |
| 2017 (28th) | Survivor's Remorse | Starz | |
| 2017 (28th) | Take My Wife | Seeso | |
| 2018 (29th) | Brooklyn Nine-Nine ‡ | Fox | |
| 2018 (29th) | The Bold Type | Freeform | |
| 2018 (29th) | Crazy Ex-Girlfriend | The CW | |
| 2018 (29th) | Modern Family | ABC | |
| 2018 (29th) | One Day at a Time | Netflix | |
| 2018 (29th) | One Mississippi | Amazon | |
| 2018 (29th) | Superstore | NBC | |
| 2018 (29th) | Survivor's Remorse | Starz | |
| 2018 (29th) | Transparent | Amazon | |
| 2018 (29th) | Will & Grace | NBC | |
| 2019 (30th) | Vida ‡ | Starz | |
| 2019 (30th) | Brooklyn Nine-Nine | NBC | |
| 2019 (30th) | Crazy Ex-Girlfriend | The CW | |
| 2019 (30th) | Dear White People | Netflix | |
| 2019 (30th) | Modern Family | ABC | |
| 2019 (30th) | One Day at a Time | Netflix | |
| 2019 (30th) | Schitt's Creek | Pop TV | |
| 2019 (30th) | Superstore | NBC | |
| 2019 (30th) | This Close | Sundance TV | |
| 2019 (30th) | Will & Grace | NBC | |

=== 2020s ===
2020s winners and nominees
| Award year | Series | Network | Ref(s). |
|---|---|---|---|
| 2020 (31st) | Schitt's Creek ‡ | Pop TV | |
| 2020 (31st) | Brooklyn Nine-Nine | NBC | |
| 2020 (31st) | Dear White People | Netflix | |
| 2020 (31st) | Dickinson | Apple TV+ | |
| 2020 (31st) | One Day at a Time | Netflix | |
| 2020 (31st) | The Other Two | Comedy Central | |
| 2020 (31st) | Sex Education | Netflix | |
| 2020 (31st) | Superstore | NBC | |
| 2020 (31st) | Vida | Starz | |
| 2020 (31st) | Work in Progress | Showtime | |
| 2021 (32nd) | Schitt's Creek ‡ | Pop TV | |
| 2021 (32nd) | Big Mouth | Netflix | |
| 2021 (32nd) | Dead to Me | Netflix | |
| 2021 (32nd) | Everything's Gonna Be Okay | Freeform | |
| 2021 (32nd) | Harley Quinn | HBO Max | |
| 2021 (32nd) | Love, Victor | Hulu | |
| 2021 (32nd) | Saved by the Bell | Peacock | |
| 2021 (32nd) | Sex Education | Netflix | |
| 2021 (32nd) | Superstore | NBC | |
| 2021 (32nd) | Twenties | BET | |
| 2022 (33rd) | Saved by the Bell ‡ | Peacock | |
| 2022 (33rd) | Dickinson | Apple TV+ | |
| 2022 (33rd) | Gentefied | Netflix | |
| 2022 (33rd) | Love, Victor | Hulu | |
| 2022 (33rd) | The Other Two | HBO Max | |
| 2022 (33rd) | Sex Education | Netflix | |
| 2022 (33rd) | Shrill | Hulu | |
| 2022 (33rd) | Special | Netflix | |
| 2022 (33rd) | Twenties | BET | |
| 2022 (33rd) | Work in Progress | Showtime | |
| 2023 (34th) | What We Do in the Shadows ‡ | FX | |
| 2023 (34th) | Abbott Elementary | ABC | |
| 2023 (34th) | Derry Girls | Netflix | |
| 2023 (34th) | Hacks | HBO Max | |
| 2023 (34th) | Harley Quinn | HBO Max | |
| 2023 (34th) | Love, Victor | Hulu | |
| 2023 (34th) | Never Have I Ever | Netflix | |
| 2023 (34th) | Only Murders in the Building | Hulu | |
| 2023 (34th) | The Sex Lives of College Girls | HBO Max | |
| 2023 (34th) | Sort Of | HBO Max | |
| 2024 (35th) | Ted Lasso ‡ | Apple TV+ | |
| 2024 (35th) | And Just Like That... | Max | |
| 2024 (35th) | Good Omens | Amazon Prime Video | |
| 2024 (35th) | Harlem | Amazon Prime Video | |
| 2024 (35th) | Harley Quinn | Max | |
| 2024 (35th) | Our Flag Means Death | Max | |
| 2024 (35th) | Sex Education | Netflix | |
| 2024 (35th) | Somebody Somewhere | HBO | |
| 2024 (35th) | What We Do in the Shadows | FX | |
| 2024 (35th) | With Love | Amazon Prime Video | |
| 2025 (36th) | Hacks ‡ | Max | |
| 2025 (36th) | Abbott Elementary | ABC | |
| 2025 (36th) | Ghosts | CBS | |
| 2025 (36th) | Loot | Apple TV+ | |
| 2025 (36th) | The Sex Lives of College Girls | Max | |
| 2025 (36th) | Shrinking | Apple TV+ | |
| 2025 (36th) | Somebody Somewhere | HBO | |
| 2025 (36th) | Sort Of | Max | |
| 2025 (36th) | We Are Lady Parts | Peacock | |
| 2025 (36th) | What We Do in the Shadows | FX | |

== Multiple wins and nominations ==
=== Programs ===
The following programs received two or more Outstanding Comedy Series awards:

| Wins | Program |
|---|---|
| 7 | Will & Grace |
| 3 | Roseanne |
| 3 | Transparent |
| 2 | Doctor Doctor |
| 2 | Glee |
| 2 | Modern Family |
| 2 | Schitt's Creek |
| 2 | Ugly Betty |

The following programs received four or more Outstanding Comedy Series nominations:

| Nominations | Program |
|---|---|
| 10 | Modern Family |
| 10 | Will & Grace |
| 7 | Brooklyn Nine-Nine |
| 6 | Glee |
| 4 | Sex and the City |
| 4 | Superstore |

=== Networks ===
The following networks received two or more Outstanding Comedy Series awards:

| Wins | Network |
|---|---|
| 11 | ABC |
| 10 | NBC |
| 3 | Amazon |
| 3 | Fox |
| 2 | CBS |
| 2 | Pop TV |

The following networks received four or more Outstanding Comedy Series nominations:

| Nominations | Network |
|---|---|
| 34 | ABC |
| 28 | NBC |
| 19 | Netflix |
| 14 | Fox |
| 9 | Amazon / Prime Video (Note: Amazon MGM Studios produces/co-produces the series published by Prime Video.) |
| 9 | HBO |
| 9 | HBO Max/Max |
| 7 | CBS |
| 6 | Showtime |
| 5 | Hulu |
| 5 | ABC Family / Freeform |
| 5 | Apple TV+ |
| 4 | Starz |
