= GLAAD Media Award for Outstanding Drama Series =

Annual US television award

- Awarded for: Excellence in depiction of the LGBT (lesbian, gay, bisexual, and transgender) community in a drama series
- Venue: Varies
- Country: United States
- Presented by: GLAAD
- First award: April 19, 1990; 36 years ago
- Currently held by: Stranger Things (2026)

The GLAAD Media Award for Outstanding Drama Series is an annual award that honors drama series for excellence in the depiction of LGBT (lesbian, gay, bisexual, and transgender) characters and themes. It is one of several categories of the annual GLAAD Media Awards, which are presented by GLAAD—an American non-governmental media monitoring organization founded in 1985, formerly called the Gay & Lesbian Alliance Against Defamation—at ceremonies in New York City, Los Angeles, and San Francisco between March and June.

The award is one of the few to date back to the 1st GLAAD Media Awards in 1990, where the ABC series HeartBeat and NBC series L.A. Law won—one of only two instances in the award's history where there was a tie. It was not given in 1992, but has been awarded every year since 1993. That year also saw a tie, with Fox's Melrose Place and ABC's One Life to Live winning; the only instance when a soap opera won the award. For the 7th GLAAD Media Awards in 1996, the category was merged with Outstanding Comedy Series to create Outstanding Television Series, but this was reverted the following year.

For a drama series to be eligible, it must include at least one LGBT character in a leading, supporting, or recurring capacity. The award may be accepted by the show's producers, writers, and/or actors. Drama series selected by GLAAD are evaluated based on four criteria: "Fair, Accurate, and Inclusive Representations" of the LGBT community, "Boldness and Originality" of the project, significant "Impact" on mainstream culture, and "Overall Quality" of the project. GLAAD monitors mainstream media to identify which drama series will be nominated, while also issuing a Call for Entries that encourages media outlets to submit programs for consideration. Dramatic programs created by and for an LGBT audience must be submitted in order to be considered for nomination, as GLAAD does not monitor such works for defamation. Winners are determined by a plurality vote of GLAAD staff and board, Shareholders Circle members, (Note: The Shareholders Circle consists of individuals who have made a donation of $1,500 or more.) as well as volunteers and affiliated individuals.

Since its inception, the award has been given to 27 drama series. With four consecutive wins out of five nominations, Brothers & Sisters has received the award more than any other program. Pose and Six Feet Under have won the award three times, while Chicago Hope, L.A. Law, and NYPD Blue have each won twice. With six nominations, Degrassi: The Next Generation is the series that has been nominated the most often without a win. The most recent recipient is Netflix's Stranger Things, which was honored at the 37th GLAAD Media Awards in 2026.

== Winners and nominees ==
Table key
‡	Indicates the winner

=== 1990s ===
1990s winners and nominees
Award year	Series	Network	Ref(s).
1990 (1st)	HeartBeat ‡	ABC	
1990 (1st)	L.A. Law ‡	NBC	
1991 (2nd)	L.A. Law ‡	NBC	
1993 (4th)	Melrose Place ‡	Fox	
1993 (4th)	One Life to Live ‡	ABC	
1994 (5th)	Sisters ‡	NBC	
1995 (6th)	My So-Called Life ‡	ABC	
1996 (Note: In 1996, the Outstanding Drama Series award was merged with Outstanding Comedy Series to create the Outstanding Television Series category.) (7th)	NYPD Blue ‡	ABC	
1996 (7th)	Courthouse	CBS	
1996 (7th)	Friends	NBC	
1996 (7th)	Party of Five	Fox	
1996 (7th)	Sisters	NBC	
1997 (8th)	Chicago Hope ‡	CBS	
1997 (8th)	Bedtime	Showtime	
1997 (8th)	Relativity	ABC	
1998 (9th)	NYPD Blue ‡	ABC	
1998 (9th)	ER	NBC	
1998 (9th)	413 Hope St.	Fox	
1999 (10th)	Chicago Hope ‡	CBS	
1999 (10th)	Homicide: Life on the Street	NBC	
1999 (10th)	Linc's	Showtime	

=== 2000s ===
2000s winners and nominees
Award year	Series	Network	Ref(s).
2000 (11th)	Dawson's Creek ‡	The WB	
2000 (11th)	Felicity	The WB	
2000 (11th)	Oz	HBO	
2000 (11th)	Undressed	MTV	
2001 (12th)	Queer as Folk ‡	Showtime	
2001 (12th)	Buffy the Vampire Slayer	UPN	
2001 (12th)	Dawson's Creek	The WB	
2001 (12th)	Felicity	The WB	
2001 (12th)	Undressed	MTV	
2002 (13th)	Six Feet Under ‡	HBO	
2002 (13th)	Buffy the Vampire Slayer	UPN	
2002 (13th)	The Education of Max Bickford	CBS	
2002 (13th)	ER	NBC	
2002 (13th)	Queer as Folk	Showtime	
2003 (14th)	Six Feet Under ‡	HBO	
2003 (14th)	Once and Again	ABC	
2003 (14th)	Queer as Folk	Showtime	
2003 (14th)	The Shield	FX	
2003 (14th)	The Wire	HBO	
2004 (15th)	Playmakers ‡	ESPN	
2004 (15th)	Degrassi: The Next Generation	The N	
2004 (15th)	Nip/Tuck	FX	
2004 (15th)	Queer as Folk	Showtime	
2004 (15th)	Six Feet Under	HBO	
2005 (16th)	Six Feet Under ‡	HBO	
2005 (16th)	Kevin Hill	UPN	
2005 (16th)	The L Word	Showtime	
2005 (16th)	Queer as Folk	Showtime	
2005 (16th)	The Wire	HBO	
2006 (17th)	The L Word ‡	Showtime	
2006 (17th)	Commander in Chief	ABC	
2006 (17th)	Queer as Folk	Showtime	
2006 (17th)	Six Feet Under	HBO	
2006 (17th)	South of Nowhere	The N	
2007 (18th)	Brothers & Sisters ‡	ABC	
2007 (18th)	Hex	BBC America	
2007 (18th)	The L Word	Showtime	
2007 (18th)	The Sopranos	HBO	
2007 (18th)	South of Nowhere	The N	
2008 (19th)	Brothers & Sisters ‡	ABC	
2008 (19th)	Degrassi: The Next Generation	The N	
2008 (19th)	Dirty Sexy Money	ABC	
2008 (19th)	Greek	ABC Family	
2008 (19th)	The L Word	Showtime	
2009 (20th)	Brothers & Sisters ‡	ABC	
2009 (20th)	The L Word	Showtime	
2009 (20th)	South of Nowhere	The N	
2009 (20th)	Torchwood	BBC America	
2009 (20th)	True Blood	HBO	

=== 2010s ===
2010s winners and nominees
Award year	Series	Network	Ref(s).
2010 (21st)	Brothers & Sisters ‡	ABC	
2010 (21st)	Grey's Anatomy	ABC	
2010 (21st)	Mad Men	AMC	
2010 (21st)	Skins	BBC America	
2010 (21st)	True Blood	HBO	
2011 (22nd)	True Blood ‡	HBO	
2011 (22nd)	Brothers & Sisters	ABC	
2011 (22nd)	Degrassi	TeenNick	
2011 (22nd)	Grey's Anatomy	ABC	
2011 (22nd)	Pretty Little Liars	ABC Family	
2012 (23rd)	Grey's Anatomy ‡	ABC	
2012 (23rd)	Degrassi	TeenNick	
2012 (23rd)	Pretty Little Liars	ABC Family	
2012 (23rd)	Shameless	Showtime	
2012 (23rd)	Torchwood: Miracle Day	Starz	
2013 (24th)	Smash ‡	NBC	
2013 (24th)	Degrassi	TeenNick	
2013 (24th)	Grey's Anatomy	ABC	
2013 (24th)	The L.A. Complex	The CW	
2013 (24th)	True Blood	HBO	
2014 (25th)	The Fosters ‡	ABC Family	
2014 (25th)	Grey's Anatomy	ABC	
2014 (25th)	Orphan Black	BBC America	
2014 (25th)	Pretty Little Liars	ABC Family	
2014 (25th)	Shameless	Showtime	
2015 (26th)	How to Get Away with Murder ‡	ABC	
2015 (26th)	Degrassi	TeenNick	
2015 (26th)	The Fosters	ABC Family	
2015 (26th)	Game of Thrones	HBO	
2015 (26th)	Grey's Anatomy	ABC	
2015 (26th)	Last Tango in Halifax	PBS	
2015 (26th)	Masters of Sex	Showtime	
2015 (26th)	Orphan Black	BBC America	
2015 (26th)	Pretty Little Liars	ABC Family	
2015 (26th)	Shameless	Showtime	
2016 (27th)	Sense8 ‡	Netflix	
2016 (27th)	Arrow	The CW	
2016 (27th)	Black Sails	Starz	
2016 (27th)	Empire	Fox	
2016 (27th)	The Fosters	ABC Family	
2016 (27th)	Grey's Anatomy	ABC	
2016 (27th)	How to Get Away with Murder	ABC	
2016 (27th)	Nashville	ABC	
2016 (27th)	Orphan Black	BBC America	
2016 (27th)	Shameless	Showtime	
2017 (28th)	Shadowhunters ‡	Freeform	
2017 (28th)	The Fosters	Freeform	
2017 (28th)	Grey's Anatomy	ABC	
2017 (28th)	Hap and Leonard	SundanceTV	
2017 (28th)	How to Get Away with Murder	ABC	
2017 (28th)	The OA	Netflix	
2017 (28th)	Orphan Black	BBC America	
2017 (28th)	Shameless	Showtime	
2017 (28th)	Supergirl	The CW	
2017 (28th)	Wynonna Earp	Syfy	
2018 (29th)	This Is Us ‡	NBC	
2018 (29th)	Billions	Showtime	
2018 (29th)	Doubt	CBS	
2018 (29th)	The Handmaid's Tale	Hulu	
2018 (29th)	Nashville	CMT	
2018 (29th)	Sense8	Netflix	
2018 (29th)	Shadowhunters	Freeform	
2018 (29th)	Star	Fox	
2018 (29th)	Star Trek: Discovery	CBS All Access	
2018 (29th)	Wynonna Earp	Syfy	
2019 (30th)	Pose ‡	FX	
2019 (30th)	Billions	Showtime	
2019 (30th)	Black Lightning	The CW	
2019 (30th)	Grey's Anatomy	ABC	
2019 (30th)	The Handmaid's Tale	Hulu	
2019 (30th)	Instinct	CBS	
2019 (30th)	Shadowhunters	Freeform	
2019 (30th)	Star	Fox	
2019 (30th)	Supergirl	The CW	
2019 (30th)	Wynonna Earp	Syfy	

=== 2020s ===
Award year	Series	Network	Ref(s).
2020 (31st)	Pose ‡	FX	
2020 (31st)	Batwoman	The CW	
2020 (31st)	Billions	Showtime	
2020 (31st)	Euphoria	HBO	
2020 (31st)	Killing Eve	BBC America	
2020 (31st)	The L Word: Generation Q	Showtime	
2020 (31st)	The Politician	Netflix	
2020 (31st)	Shadowhunters	Freeform	
2020 (31st)	Star Trek: Discovery	CBS All Access	
2020 (31st)	Supergirl	The CW	
2021 (32nd)	Star Trek: Discovery ‡	CBS All Access	
2021 (32nd)	9-1-1: Lone Star	Fox	
2021 (32nd)	Killing Eve	BBC America	
2021 (32nd)	P-Valley	Starz	
2021 (32nd)	Ratched	Netflix	
2021 (32nd)	Supergirl	The CW	
2021 (32nd)	The Umbrella Academy	Netflix	
2021 (32nd)	Vida	Starz	
2021 (32nd)	The Wilds	Amazon	
2021 (32nd)	Wynonna Earp	Syfy	
2022 (33rd)	Pose ‡	FX	
2022 (33rd)	9-1-1: Lone Star	Fox	
2022 (33rd)	Batwoman	The CW	
2022 (33rd)	The Chi	Showtime	
2022 (33rd)	Doom Patrol	HBO Max	
2022 (33rd)	Good Trouble	Freeform	
2022 (33rd)	Grey's Anatomy	ABC	
2022 (33rd)	The L Word: Generation Q	Showtime	
2022 (33rd)	Star Trek: Discovery	Paramount+	
2022 (33rd)	Supergirl	The CW	
2023 (34th)	9-1-1: Lone Star ‡	Fox	
2023 (34th)	Chucky	Syfy	
2023 (34th)	Good Trouble	Freeform	
2023 (34th)	Gossip Girl	HBO Max	
2023 (34th)	Grey's Anatomy	ABC	
2023 (34th)	The L Word: Generation Q	Showtime	
2023 (34th)	P-Valley	Starz	
2023 (34th)	September Mornings	Prime Video	
2023 (34th)	Star Trek: Discovery	Paramount+	
2023 (34th)	The Umbrella Academy	Netflix	
2024 (35th)	Yellowjackets ‡	Showtime	
2024 (35th)	9-1-1: Lone Star	Fox	
2024 (35th)	The Chi	Showtime	
2024 (35th)	Chucky	Syfy / USA Network	
2024 (35th)	Doctor Who	Disney+	
2024 (35th)	Good Trouble	Freeform	
2024 (35th)	Grey's Anatomy	ABC	
2024 (35th)	Quantum Leap	NBC	
2024 (35th)	Riverdale	The CW	
2024 (35th)	Station 19	ABC	
2025 (36th)	9-1-1: Lone Star ‡	Fox	
2025 (36th)	Arcane	Netflix	
2025 (36th)	The Chi	Showtime	
2025 (36th)	Doctor Who	Disney+	
2025 (36th)	Found	NBC	
2025 (36th)	Heartbreak High	Netflix	
2025 (36th)	Interview with the Vampire	AMC	
2025 (36th)	Star Trek: Discovery	Paramount+	
2025 (36th)	The Umbrella Academy	Netflix	
2025 (36th)	Wicked City	ALLBLK	
2026 (37th)	Stranger Things ‡	Netflix	
2026 (37th)	Brilliant Minds	NBC	
2026 (37th)	The Buccaneers	Apple TV	
2026 (37th)	Doctor Who	Disney+	
2026 (37th)	The Gilded Age	HBO	
2026 (37th)	The Last of Us	HBO	
2026 (37th)	Power Book III: Raising Kanan	Starz	
2026 (37th)	The Sandman	Netflix	
2026 (37th)	Severance	Apple TV	
2026 (37th)	Yellowjackets	Showtime	

== Multiple wins and nominations ==
=== Programs ===
The following programs received two or more Outstanding Drama Series awards:

Wins	Program
4	Brothers & Sisters
3	Pose
3	Six Feet Under
2	9-1-1: Lone Star
2	Chicago Hope
2	L.A. Law
2	NYPD Blue

The following programs received four or more Outstanding Drama Series nominations:

Nominations	Program
12	Grey's Anatomy
6	Degrassi: The Next Generation
6	Queer as Folk
6	Star Trek: Discovery
5	9-1-1: Lone Star
5	Brothers & Sisters
5	Shameless
5	Six Feet Under
5	Supergirl
5	The L Word
4	The Fosters
4	Orphan Black
4	Pretty Little Liars
4	Shadowhunters
4	True Blood
4	Wynonna Earp

=== Networks ===
The following networks received two or more Outstanding Drama Series awards:

Wins	Network
11	ABC
5	NBC
4	HBO
3	Showtime
3	Fox
3	FX
2	ABC Family / Freeform
2	CBS
2	Netflix

The following networks received four or more Outstanding Drama Series nominations:

Nominations	Network
29	ABC
29	Showtime
17	HBO
16	ABC Family / Freeform
13	NBC
12	Netflix
11	The CW
11	Fox
9	BBC America
9	The N / TeenNick
6	CBS
6	CBS All Access / Paramount+
6	Starz
6	Syfy
5	FX
4	The WB
