= 29th GLAAD Media Awards =

Annual US media awards ceremony

The 29th GLAAD Media Awards was the 2018 annual presentation of the GLAAD Media Awards, presented by GLAAD honoring the 2017 media season. The awards honor films, television shows, musicians and works of journalism that fairly and accurately represent the LGBT community and issues relevant to the community.

GLAAD announced over 100 nominees in 21 English-language categories in January 2018. Some of the awards were presented in Los Angeles on April 12, 2018. The remaining awards were presented in New York City on May 5, 2018 hosted by Ross Mathews. The Outstanding Kids & Family Programming Award category was introduced for the first time in this ceremony.

At the April 12 ceremony, Britney Spears received the Vanguard Award and Jim Parsons the Stephen F. Kolzak Award, presented by Ricky Martin and Ryan Murphy respectively. At the May 5 ceremony, Ava DuVernay was honored with the Excellence in Media Award while Samira Wiley was recognized with the Vito Russo Award, presented by Senator Cory Booker and Alexis Bledel respectively. Jay-Z’s mother, Gloria Carter, accepted for her and her son the Special Recognition for the song "Smile".

== Winners and nominees ==
Winners are presented in bold.

=== Film ===
**Outstanding Film – Wide Release**: **Call Me by Your Name – Sony Pictures Classics**‡; Battle of the Sexes – Fox Searchlight Pictures; Lady Bird – A24; Professor Marston and the Wonder Women – Annapurna Pictures; The Shape of Water – Fox Searchlight Pictures	**Outstanding Film – Limited Release**: **A Fantastic Woman – Sony Pictures Classics**‡; BPM – The Orchard; God's Own Country – Samuel Goldwyn Films / Orion Pictures; Thelma – The Orchard; The Wound – Kino Lorber

=== Television ===
Award	Nominees
Outstanding Comedy Series	**Brooklyn Nine-Nine**; The Bold Type; Crazy Ex-Girlfriend; Modern Family; One Day at a Time; One Mississippi; Superstore; Survivor's Remorse; Transparent; Will & Grace
Outstanding Drama Series	**This Is Us**; Billions; Doubt; The Handmaid's Tale; Nashville; Sense8; Shadowhunters; Star; Star Trek: Discovery; Wynonna Earp
Outstanding Kids & Family Programming	**Andi Mack**; The Loud House; Steven Universe; Danger & Eggs; Doc McStuffins
Outstanding Individual Episode (in a series without a regular LGBT character)	**"Thanksgiving", Master of None**; "Chapter 8", Legion; "Grace", Pure Genius; "Lady Cha Cha", Easy; "Johnson", Pure
Outstanding TV Movie or Limited Series	**When We Rise**; American Horror Story: Cult; Feud: Bette and Joan; Godless; Queers (TV series)
Outstanding Documentary	**Gender Revolution: A Journey with Katie Couric**; Chavela; Kiki; "Real Boy" of Independent Lens; This is Everything: Gigi Gorgeous
Outstanding Reality Program	**Survivor: Game Changers**; Gaycation with Ellen Page; I Am Jazz; The Voice
Outstanding Daily Drama	**The Bold and The Beautiful**; Days of Our Lives; The Young and the Restless

=== Other ===
Award	Nominees
Outstanding Blog	**TransGriot**; Autostraddle; Gays With Kids; My Fabulous Disease; Pittsburgh Lesbian Correspondents
Outstanding Comic Book	**Black Panther: World of Wakanda, written by Roxane Gay, Ta-Nehisi Coates, Yona Harvey, Rembert Browne**; America, written by Gabby Rivera; The Backstagers, written by James Tynion IV; Batwoman, written by Marguerite Bennett, James Tynion IV; Deadman: Dark Mansion of Forbidden Love, written by Sarah Vaughn; Goldie Vance, written by Hope Larson; Iceman, written by Sina Grace; Lumberjanes, written by Shannon Watters, Kat Leyh; Quantum Teens are Go, written by Magdalene Visaggio; The Woods, written by James Tynion IV
Outstanding Music Artist	**Halsey, Hopeless Fountain Kingdom**; Miley Cyrus, Younger Now; Honey Dijon, The Best of Both Worlds; Kehlani, SweetSexySavage; Kelela, Take Me Apart; Kesha, Rainbow; Perfume Genius, No Shape; Sam Smith, The Thrill of It All; St. Vincent, Masseduction; Wrabel, We Could Be Beautiful
Outstanding Talk Show Episode	**"Australia Marriage Equality", Last Week Tonight with John Oliver**; "Danica Roem", The Opposition with Jordan Klepper; "Laila and Logan Ireland, Transgender Military Couple", The Ellen DeGeneres Show; "Laverne Cox and Gavin Grimm", The View; "Trans Veterans React to Ban", The Daily Show with Trevor Noah
Outstanding Journalism Newsmagazine	**"The Pulse of Orlando: Terror at the Nightclub", Anderson Cooper 360°**; "A Boy Named Lucas", 20/20; "China Queer", The Naked Truth; "Gay Purge?", Nightline; "Trans Youth", Vice
Outstanding TV Journalism Segment	**"Murders Raise Alarm for Transgender Community", NBC Nightly News**; "The Abolitionists Face the Love Army", KAPP-KVEW Local News; "DJ Zeke Thomas Goes Public", Good Morning America; "Transgender Murders in Louisiana Part of Disturbing Trend", CBS Evening News; "Transgender Rights under Fire in Trump Era", AM Joy
Outstanding Newspaper Article	**"The Silent Epidemic: Black Gay Men and HIV" [series], The Atlanta Journal-Constitution**; "Fearfully and Wonderfully Made: The Journey of a Transgender Man" by Lauren McGaughy, The Dallas Morning News; "Lesbian College Coaches Still Face Difficult Atmosphere to Come Out" by Shannon Ryan, Chicago Tribune; "Pulse Victims' Families in Puerto Rico: 'We Have to Cry Alone" by Jennifer A. Marcial Ocasio, Orlando Sentinel; "Revised Guidance on HIV Proves Life-Transforming" by Lenny Bernstein, The Washington Post
Outstanding Magazine Article	**"Forbidden Lives: The Gay Men Who Fled Chechnya's Purge" by Masha Gessen, The New Yorker**; "America's Hidden H.I.V. Epidemic" by Linda Villarosa, The New York Times Magazine; "Beyond 'He' or 'She': The Changing Meaning of Gender and Sexuality" by Katy Steinmetz, Time; "Free Radical" by Nathan Heller, Vogue; "Trans, Teen, and Homeless" by Laura Rena Murray, Rolling Stone
Outstanding Magazine Overall Coverage	**Billboard**; The Advocate; People; Teen Vogue; Time
Outstanding Digital Journalism Article	**"Why Bisexual Men Are Still Fighting to Convince Us They Exist" by Samantha Allen, Splinter News**; "The Ballad of Bobby Brooks, the First Gay Student-Body President of Texas A&M" by Lauren Larson, GQ.com; "For Those We Lost and Those Who Survived: The Pulse Massacre One Year Later" by James Michael Nichols, HuffPost Queer Voices; "I Am a Girl Now,' Sage Smith Wrote. Then She Went Missing." by Emma Eisenberg, Splinter News; "Meet the Transgender Student Who Fought Discrimination at His Maryland High School (and Won)" by Nico Lang, INTO
Outstanding Digital Journalism - Multimedia	**"'This Is How We Win': Inside Danica Roem's Historic Victory" by Diana Tourjée, Broadly.Vice.com**; "Former Patriots and Chiefs Tackle Ryan O'Callaghan Comes Out as Gay" by Cyd Zeigler, SB Nation; "Made to Model: Trans Beauty in Fashion", LogoTV.com; "Transgender Day of Remembrance" by Saeed Jones, BuzzFeed News; "US Travel Ban Leaves LGBT Refugees in Limbo" by Nina dos Santos, CNN.com
Special Recognition	**In a Heartbeat**; **Jay-Z and Gloria Carter for "Smile"**
Vanguard Award	**Britney Spears**
Stephen F. Kolzak Award	**Jim Parsons**
Vito Russo Award	**Samira Wiley**
Excellence in Media Award	**Ava DuVernay**
