= GLAAD Media Award for Outstanding Film – Wide Release =

Annual award honouring films

- Awarded for: Excellence in depiction of the LGBT (lesbian, gay, bisexual, and transgender) community in a wide-release film
- Venue: Varies
- Country: United States
- Presented by: GLAAD
- First award: April 22, 1991; 35 years ago
- Currently held by: Kiss of the Spider Woman (2026)

The GLAAD Media Award for Outstanding Film – Wide Release is an annual award that honors films that received a wide release for excellence in the depiction of LGBT (lesbian, gay, bisexual, and transgender) characters and themes. It is one of several categories of the annual GLAAD Media Awards, which are presented by GLAAD—an American non-governmental media monitoring organization founded in 1985, formerly called the Gay & Lesbian Alliance Against Defamation—at ceremonies in New York City, Los Angeles, and San Francisco between March and June.

The award was given for the first time during the 2nd GLAAD Media Awards in 1991 to Longtime Companion, distributed by The Samuel Goldwyn Company, and The Handmaid's Tale, distributed by Cinecom. There were only two more instances in which two films shared the award: Frankie and Johnny and Fried Green Tomatoes in 1992, and The Adventures of Priscilla, Queen of the Desert and Go Fish in 1995. While no film was recognized in 1993, the award has been present at every ceremony since 1994. At the 7th GLAAD Media Awards, a clear distinction was made between films that received a wide release versus a limited release, with this award being titled as Outstanding Studio Film, before being retitled to its current name the following year. Due to the impact of the COVID-19 pandemic on cinema, during the ceremonies in 2021 and 2022, the category also included films released by major studios on streaming services for a premium fee of $19 or more. Starting with the 2023 ceremony, due to the reorganization of the categories, this award now excludes streaming films.

For a film to be eligible, it must be released by a recognized film distribution company and play for paid admission in Los Angeles for seven consecutive days. Wide release is defined by a combination of criteria such as the numbers of screens, budget, and visibility. The award may be accepted by any of the film's producers, directors, writers, or actors. Wide-released films selected by GLAAD are evaluated based on four criteria: "Fair, Accurate, and Inclusive Representations" of the LGBT community, "Boldness and Originality" of the project, significant "Impact" on mainstream culture, and "Overall Quality" of the project. GLAAD monitors mainstream media to identify which films will be nominated, while also issuing a Call for Entries that encourages media outlets to submit films for consideration. By contrast, in order for films created by and for LGBT audiences to be considered for nomination, they must be submitted after the Call for Entries. Winners are determined by a plurality vote by GLAAD staff and its board, Shareholders Circle members, (Note: The Shareholders Circle consists of individuals who have made a donation of $1,500 or more.) volunteers and affiliated individuals.

Since its inception, the award has been given to 38 films. At the 37th GLAAD Media Awards in 2026, the award was given to Kiss of the Spider Woman, distributed by Lionsgate.

== Winners and nominees ==
Initially, GLAAD only announced the winners during press releases, with the awards being given during the ceremonies. For the 7th GLAAD Media Awards in 1996, GLAAD made the list of nominees in this category publicly available, announcing the winner at a latter date. Since then, the nominees in all categories have been made public.

Table key
| ‡ | Indicates the winner |

=== 1990s ===
1990s winners and nominees
| Award year | Film | Distributor | Ref(s). |
|---|---|---|---|
| 1991 (2nd) | The Handmaid's Tale ‡ | Cinecom | |
| 1991 (2nd) | Longtime Companion ‡ | The Samuel Goldwyn Company | |
| 1992 (3rd) | Frankie and Johnny ‡ | Paramount Pictures | |
| 1992 (3rd) | Fried Green Tomatoes ‡ | Universal Pictures | |
| 1994 (5th) | Philadelphia ‡ | TriStar Pictures | |
| 1995 (6th) | The Adventures of Priscilla, Queen of the Desert ‡ | Gramercy Pictures | |
| 1995 (6th) | Go Fish ‡ | The Samuel Goldwyn Company | |
| 1996 (7th) | Boys on the Side ‡ | Warner Bros. | |
| 1996 (7th) | Carrington | Gramercy Pictures | |
| 1996 (7th) | Home for the Holidays | Paramount Pictures | |
| 1996 (7th) | To Wong Foo, Thanks for Everything! Julie Newmar | Universal Pictures | |
| 1997 (8th) | Bound ‡ | Gramercy Pictures | |
| 1997 (8th) | The Birdcage | Metro-Goldwyn-Mayer | |
| 1997 (8th) | Flirting with Disaster | Miramax | |
| 1997 (8th) | Get on the Bus | Columbia Pictures | |
| 1997 (8th) | Set It Off | New Line Cinema | |
| 1998 (9th) | In & Out ‡ | Paramount Pictures | |
| 1998 (9th) | As Good as It Gets | TriStar Pictures | |
| 1998 (9th) | Midnight in the Garden of Good and Evil | Warner Bros. | |
| 1998 (9th) | My Best Friend's Wedding | TriStar Pictures | |
| 1999 (10th) | Gods and Monsters ‡ | Regent Entertainment | |
| 1999 (10th) | The Object of My Affection | 20th Century Fox | |
| 1999 (10th) | The Opposite of Sex | Sony Pictures Classics | |
| 1999 (10th) | Wilde | Sony Pictures Classics | |

=== 2000s ===
2000s winners and nominees
| Award year | Film | Distributor | Ref(s). |
|---|---|---|---|
| 2000 (11th) | Being John Malkovich ‡ | USA Films | |
| 2000 (11th) | Big Daddy | Columbia Pictures | |
| 2000 (11th) | Election | Paramount Pictures | |
| 2000 (11th) | Flawless | Metro-Goldwyn-Mayer | |
| 2000 (11th) | Happy, Texas | Miramax | |
| 2001 (12th) | Billy Elliot ‡ | Universal Focus | |
| 2001 (12th) | Best in Show | Warner Bros. Pictures | |
| 2001 (12th) | The Next Best Thing | Paramount Pictures | |
| 2001 (12th) | Wonder Boys | Paramount Pictures | |
| 2002 (13th) | The Mexican ‡ | DreamWorks Pictures | |
| 2003 (14th) | The Hours ‡ | Paramount Pictures | |
| 2003 (14th) | Far from Heaven | Focus Features | |
| 2003 (14th) | Frida | Miramax | |
| 2003 (14th) | The Rules of Attraction | Lionsgate Films | |
| 2003 (14th) | Sweet Home Alabama | Touchstone Pictures | |
| 2004 (15th) | Bend It Like Beckham ‡ | Fox Searchlight Pictures | |
| 2004 (15th) | Under the Tuscan Sun | Touchstone Pictures | |
| 2005 (16th) | Kinsey ‡ | Fox Searchlight Pictures | |
| 2005 (16th) | Alexander | Warner Bros. Pictures | |
| 2005 (16th) | A Home at the End of the World | Warner Independent Pictures | |
| 2005 (16th) | Monster | Newmarket Films | |
| 2005 (16th) | Saved! | United Artists | |
| 2006 (17th) | Brokeback Mountain ‡ | Focus Features | |
| 2006 (17th) | Capote | Sony Pictures Classics | |
| 2006 (17th) | The Family Stone | 20th Century Fox | |
| 2006 (17th) | Kiss Kiss Bang Bang | Warner Bros. | |
| 2006 (17th) | Rent | Sony Pictures | |
| 2007 (18th) | Little Miss Sunshine ‡ | Fox Searchlight Pictures | |
| 2007 (18th) | The Night Listener | Miramax | |
| 2007 (18th) | Running with Scissors | TriStar Pictures | |
| 2007 (18th) | Talladega Nights: The Ballad of Ricky Bobby | Columbia Pictures | |
| 2007 (18th) | V for Vendetta | Warner Bros. Pictures | |
| 2008 (19th) | Stardust ‡ | Paramount Pictures | |
| 2008 (19th) | Across the Universe | Revolution Studios | |
| 2008 (19th) | The Jane Austen Book Club | Sony Pictures Classics | |
| 2009 (20th) | Milk ‡ | Focus Features | |
| 2009 (20th) | Brideshead Revisited | Miramax | |
| 2009 (20th) | Nick & Norah's Infinite Playlist | Columbia Pictures | |
| 2009 (20th) | RocknRolla | Warner Bros. | |
| 2009 (20th) | Vicky Cristina Barcelona | The Weinstein Company | |

=== 2010s ===
2000s winners and nominees
| Award year | Film | Distributor | Ref(s). |
|---|---|---|---|
| 2010 (21st) | A Single Man ‡ | The Weinstein Company | |
| 2010 (21st) | Everybody's Fine | Miramax | |
| 2010 (21st) | I Love You, Man | DreamWorks Pictures | |
| 2010 (21st) | Precious | Lionsgate Films | |
| 2010 (21st) | Taking Woodstock | Focus Features | |
| 2011 (22nd) | The Kids Are All Right ‡ | Focus Features | |
| 2011 (22nd) | Burlesque | Screen Gems | |
| 2011 (22nd) | Easy A | Screen Gems | |
| 2011 (22nd) | The Girl Who Played with Fire | Music Box Films | |
| 2011 (22nd) | Scott Pilgrim vs. the World | Universal Pictures | |
| 2012 (23rd) | Beginners ‡ | Focus Features | |
| 2012 (23rd) | Albert Nobbs | Entertainment One | |
| 2012 (23rd) | J. Edgar | Warner Bros. Pictures | |
| 2013 (24th) | The Perks of Being a Wallflower ‡ | Summit Entertainment | |
| 2013 (24th) | The Best Exotic Marigold Hotel | Fox Searchlight Pictures | |
| 2013 (24th) | Cloud Atlas | Warner Bros. Pictures | |
| 2013 (24th) | ParaNorman | Focus Features | |
| 2013 (24th) | Your Sister's Sister | IFC Films | |
| 2014 (25th) | Philomena ‡ | The Weinstein Company | |
| 2014 (25th) | Blue Is the Warmest Colour | Sundance Selects | |
| 2014 (25th) | Dallas Buyers Club | Focus Features | |
| 2014 (25th) | Kill Your Darlings | Sony Pictures Classics | |
| 2014 (25th) | The Mortal Instruments: City of Bones | Sony Pictures Releasing | |
| 2015 (26th) | The Imitation Game ‡ | The Weinstein Company | |
| 2015 (26th) | Love Is Strange | Sony Pictures Classics | |
| 2015 (26th) | Pride | CBS Films | |
| 2015 (26th) | The Skeleton Twins | Roadside Attractions | |
| 2015 (26th) | Tammy | Warner Bros. Pictures | |
| 2016 (27th) | Carol ‡ | The Weinstein Company | |
| 2016 (27th) | The Danish Girl | Focus Features | |
| 2016 (27th) | Dope | Open Road Films | |
| 2016 (27th) | Freeheld | Lionsgate | |
| 2016 (27th) | Grandma | Sony Pictures Classics | |
| 2017 (28th) | Moonlight ‡ | A24 | |
| 2017 (28th) | Star Trek Beyond | Paramount Pictures | |
| 2018 (29th) | Call Me by Your Name ‡ | Sony Pictures Classics | |
| 2018 (29th) | Battle of the Sexes | Fox Searchlight | |
| 2018 (29th) | Lady Bird | A24 | |
| 2018 (29th) | Professor Marston and the Wonder Women | Annapurna Pictures | |
| 2018 (29th) | The Shape of Water | Fox Searchlight | |
| 2019 (30th) | Love, Simon ‡ | 20th Century Fox | |
| 2019 (30th) | Blockers | Universal Pictures | |
| 2019 (30th) | Crazy Rich Asians | Warner Bros. | |
| 2019 (30th) | Deadpool 2 | 20th Century Fox | |
| 2019 (30th) | The Girl in the Spider’s Web | Sony Pictures | |

=== 2020s ===
2020s winners and nominees
| Award year | Film | Distributor | Ref(s). |
|---|---|---|---|
| 2020 (31st) | Booksmart ‡ | United Artists Releasing | |
| 2020 (31st) | Bombshell | Lionsgate | |
| 2020 (31st) | Downton Abbey | Focus Features | |
| 2020 (31st) | Judy | Roadside Attractions | |
| 2020 (31st) | Rocketman | Paramount Pictures | |
| 2021 (32nd) | Happiest Season ‡ | Hulu/TriStar Pictures | |
| 2021 (32nd) | The Craft: Legacy | Sony Pictures | |
| 2021 (32nd) | Ma Rainey's Black Bottom | Netflix | |
| 2021 (32nd) | The Old Guard | Netflix | |
| 2021 (32nd) | The Prom | Netflix | |
| 2022 (33rd) | Eternals ‡ | Walt Disney Studios Motion Pictures | |
| 2022 (33rd) | Everybody's Talking About Jamie | Amazon Studios | |
| 2022 (33rd) | The Mitchells vs. the Machines | Netflix | |
| 2022 (33rd) | tick, tick... BOOM! | Netflix | |
| 2022 (33rd) | West Side Story | Walt Disney Studios Motion Pictures | |
| 2023 (34th) | Bros ‡ | Universal Pictures | |
| 2023 (34th) | A Man Called Otto | Sony Pictures | |
| 2023 (34th) | Bodies Bodies Bodies | A24 | |
| 2023 (34th) | Everything Everywhere All at Once | A24 | |
| 2023 (34th) | Lightyear | Pixar | |
| 2023 (34th) | Nope | Universal Pictures | |
| 2023 (34th) | Scream | Paramount Pictures | |
| 2023 (34th) | Spoiler Alert | Focus Features | |
| 2023 (34th) | Strange World | Walt Disney Studios Motion Pictures | |
| 2023 (34th) | Tár | Focus Features | |
2024 (35th)
| 2024 (35th) | Bottoms ‡ | Metro-Goldwyn-Mayer | |
| 2024 (35th) | All of Us Strangers | Searchlight Pictures | |
| 2024 (35th) | American Fiction | Amazon MGM Studios | |
| 2024 (35th) | Anyone but You | Columbia Pictures | |
| 2024 (35th) | The Blackening | Lionsgate Films | |
| 2024 (35th) | The Color Purple | Warner Bros. | |
| 2024 (35th) | It's a Wonderful Knife | RLJE Films | |
| 2024 (35th) | Knock at the Cabin | Universal Pictures | |
| 2024 (35th) | Moving On | Roadside Attractions | |
| 2024 (35th) | Shortcomings | Sony Pictures Classics | |
| 2025 (36th) | My Old Ass ‡ | Amazon MGM Studios | |
| 2025 (36th) | Cuckoo | Neon | |
| 2025 (36th) | Drive-Away Dolls | Focus Features | |
| 2025 (36th) | Love Lies Bleeding | A24 | |
| 2025 (36th) | Mean Girls | Paramount Pictures | |
| 2025 (36th) | Problemista | A24 | |
| 2025 (36th) | Queer | A24 | |
| 2025 (36th) | Wicked | Universal Pictures | |
| 2026 (37th) | Kiss of the Spider Woman ‡ | Lionsgate/Roadside Attractions/LD Entertainment | |
| 2026 (37th) | Blue Moon | Sony Pictures Classics | |
| 2026 (37th) | Christy | Black Bear Pictures | |
| 2026 (37th) | Clown in a Cornfield | RLJE Films/Shudder | |
| 2026 (37th) | Downton Abbey: The Grand Finale | Focus Features | |
| 2026 (37th) | The History of Sound | Mubi (streaming service) | |
| 2026 (37th) | I Know What You Did Last Summer | Sony Pictures Motion Picture Group | |
| 2026 (37th) | On Swift Horses | Sony Pictures Classics | |
| 2026 (37th) | Twinless | Roadside Attractions | |
| 2026 (37th) | The Wedding Banquet | Bleecker Street | |
