= HeartBeat (1988 TV series) =

American medical drama television series

- HeartBeat title card
- Genre: Medical drama
- Created by: Sara Davidson
- Starring: Kate Mulgrew; Laura Johnson; Gail Strickland; Ben Masters; Lynn Whitfield; Julie Ronnie
- Theme music composer: Bill Conti
- Country of origin: United States
- Original language: English
- No. of seasons: 2
- No. of episodes: 18

Production
- Executive producers: Esther Shapiro; Richard Shapiro; Aaron Spelling
- Producer: George Eckstein
- Running time: 48 mins.
- Production company: Aaron Spelling Productions

Original release
- Network: ABC
- Release: March 23, 1988 – March 30, 1989

HeartBeat is an American medical drama television series that premiered on ABC on March 23, 1988, and ran for two seasons.

== Plot ==
HeartBeat follows the staff of Women's Medical Arts, a medical center founded by three women who are frustrated with how women's health concerns are addressed in the male-dominated medical field.

== Cast and characters ==
=== Main ===
- Kate Mulgrew as Dr. Joanne Springsteen/Halloran, co-founder of the clinic (the character's name was changed from Springsteen to Halloran in season 2)
- Laura Johnson as Dr. Eve Autrey/Calvert, co-founder of the clinic (the character's name was changed from Autrey to Calvert in season 2)
- Gail Strickland as Nurse Marilyn McGrath, a nurse practitioner and co-founder of the clinic
- Lynn Whitfield as Dr. Cory Banks
- Ben Masters as Dr. Leo Rosetti
- Darrell Larson as Dr. Paul Jared
- Julie Ronnie as Nurse Alice Swanson

=== Recurring ===
- Gina Hecht as Patty, long-term partner of Marilyn McGrath
- Lou Beatty Jr. as Dixon

== Development and production ==
The fictional Women's Medical Arts clinic was based on the Santa Monica Women's Clinic in Santa Monica, California. Dr. Karen Blanchard (OBGYN), the clinic's founder, served as a model for the character played by Kate Mulgrew.

== Groundbreaking lesbian content ==
HeartBeat was the first prime time television series in the United States to feature a recurring lesbian couple on prime-time, and a lesbian as a main character, Marilyn McGrath; she had a partner Patty, in a long-term lesbian relationship. The show won GLAAD’s first Media Award for Outstanding Drama Series in 1990, which it shared with L.A. Law. However, in his autobiography, Aaron Spelling stated that ABC demanded a scene in which Marilyn dances with Patty be cut.

== Release ==
=== Broadcast ===
HeartBeat debuted on Wednesday, March 23, 1988, at 9 p.m. (Eastern) as a special two-hour pilot; moving to its regular broadcast time of 10 p.m. the following week. For the second season, the schedule was changed to Thursday at 10:00 p.m. This programming made it compete with L.A. Law, one of the most popular series at the time. HeartBeat did not perform well in the ratings and was canceled at the end of its second season. The series finale aired on April 6, 1989.

== Episodes ==
=== Series overview ===
Season	Episodes	Originally released	
Season	Episodes	First released	Last released
1	7	March 23, 1988	April 21, 1988
2	12	January 3, 1989	March 30, 1989

=== Season 1 (1988) ===
No. overall	No. in season	Title	Directed by	Written by	Original release date	Rating/share (households)
1	1	"Pilot"	Harry Winer	Sara Davidson	March 23, 1988	14.7/25
2	2	"Pilot"	Harry Winer	Sara Davidson	March 23, 1988	14.7/25
3	3	"Where's Solomon When You Need Him?"	Gene Reynolds	William A. Schwartz	March 30, 1988	14.0/23
4	4	"Two Out of Six"	Gene Reynolds	William A. Schwartz	April 6, 1988	12.3/22
5	5	"Cory's Loss"	Gene Reynolds	Sara Davidson & William A. Schwartz	April 13, 1988	12.3/21
6	6	"To Heal a Doctor"	Dale White	William A. Schwartz & Sara Davidson	April 20, 1988	12.4/22
7	7	"The Wedding"	Gene Reynolds	Dan Wakefield	April 21, 1988	8.8/15

=== Season 2 (1989) ===
No. overall	No. in season	Title	Directed by	Written by	Original release date	U.S. viewers (millions)	Rating/share (households)
7	1	"Paradise Lost"	Bill Duke	Sara Davidson & Frederick Rappaport	January 3, 1989	17.3	12.7/21
8	2	"Bivouac Babies"	Michael Fresco	Sara Davidson, Frederick Rappaport, William A. Schwartz, Doug Steinberg, Joe Viola	January 5, 1989	8.3	6.7/11
9	3	"Critical Overload"	Reza Badiyi	Sara Davidson & Carol Mendelsohn	January 12, 1989	9.4	7.0/11
10	4	"Stress"	Nancy Malone	Sara Davidson & Robert Harders	January 19, 1989	10.1	7.1/11
11	5	"Baby, Maybe"	Robert Becker	Sara Davidson, Frederick Rappaport, Doug Steinberg	January 26, 1989	9.4	7.2/12
12	6	"Prison"	Al Waxman	Sara Davidson & Robert Harders	February 2, 1989	9.9	7.5/12
13	7	"South and a Little to the Right of Eden"	Kim Friedman	Sara Davidson, William A. Schwartz, Doug Steinberg	February 16, 1989	6.9	5.6/9
14	8	"Last Tango"	Helaine Head	Sara Davidson & Doris Silverton	February 23, 1989	6.7	5.4/9
15	9	"From Russia With Love"	Al Waxman	Sara Davidson, Frederick Rappaport, Doug Steinberg	March 9, 1989	7.9	6.3/11
16	10	"Gestalt and Battery"	Gwen Arner	Sara Davidson & Julie Sayres	March 16, 1989	8.2	6.3/11
17	11	"Confidentially Yours"	Greg Rose	Sara Davidson, Frederick Rappaport, Doug Steinberg	March 23, 1989	10.8	8.1/14
18	12	"What the Inspector Saw"	Robert Becker	Sara Davidson, Jennie Blackton, Joanne Greenberg, Robert Harders	March 30, 1989	7.3	5.2/9

== Reception ==
HeartBeat is praised by LGBT television historians for its inclusion of Marilyn and Patty as a couple, and for their sexual orientation being treated as a non-issue. However, ABC received criticism because unlike the heterosexual characters, Marilyn and Patty were not permitted to be sexual or physically affectionate with each other. The feminist content and context of HeartBeat have been studied by feminist cultural critics.

=== Awards and nominations ===
HeartBeat was nominated for the 1989 People's Choice Award for Favorite New TV Drama.

It received the first-ever GLAAD Media Award for Outstanding Drama Series in 1990 (shared with L.A. Law).
