= Protect trans kids =

Slogan of the transgender rights movement

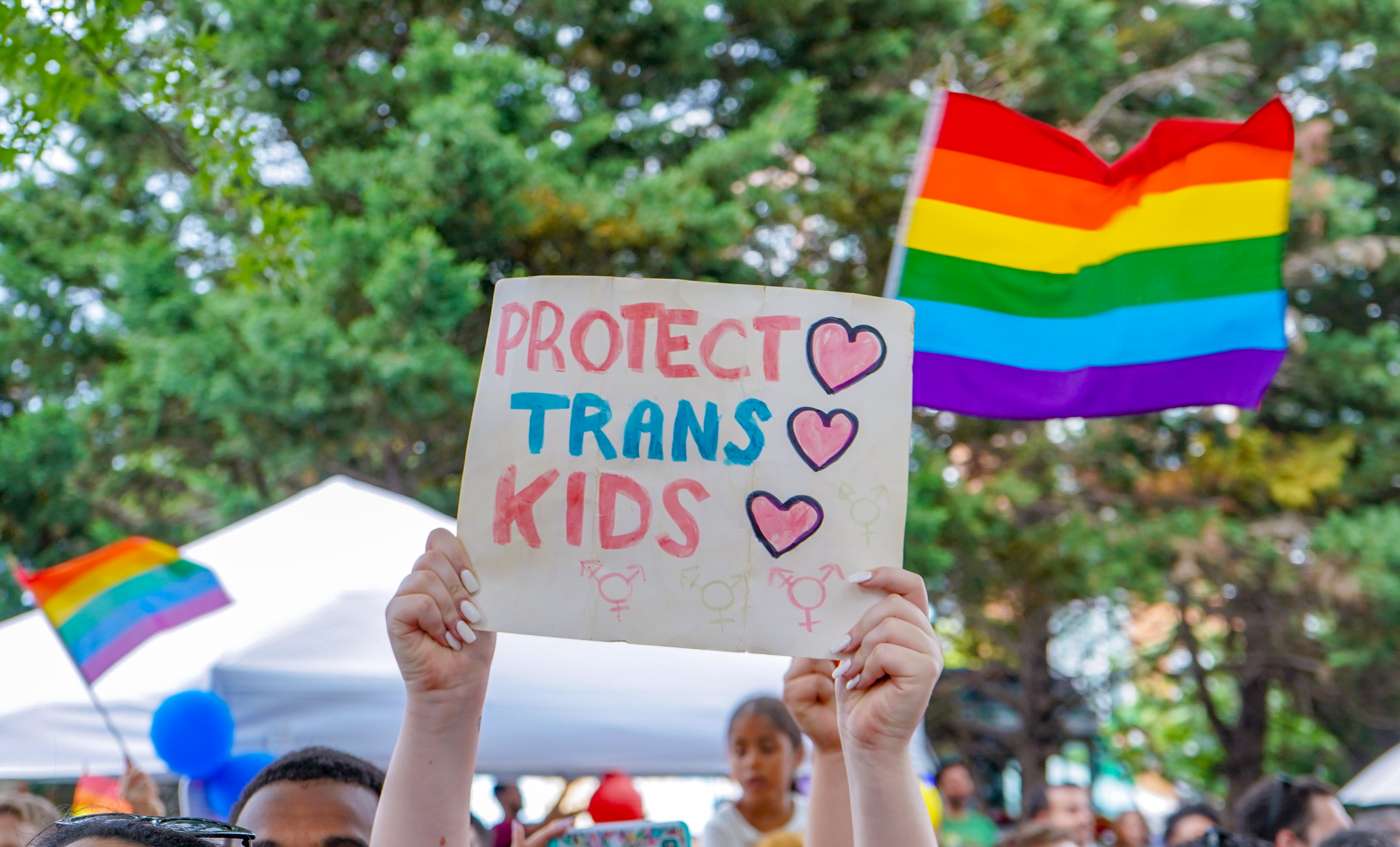
A sign reading "protect trans kids" at the 2018 Capital Pride Parade in Washington, D.C.

"Protect trans kids" is a slogan used in support of the transgender rights movement with a focus on transgender youth. The phrase is often used in protests by transgender rights activists, being placed on signs and shirts. Professional athletes and entertainers have also been documented using or wearing the phrase in support of pro–trans rights sentiments. Related phrases and variations, such as "protect trans youth", also have been used by activists.

== Early history ==
One of the earliest documented uses of the phrase came in February 2016, Caitlyn Jenner tweeted "Tell @SDGovDaugaard to protect trans kids by vetoing #HB1008," in reference to South Dakota House Bill 1008. The bill's intended purpose was to restrict transgender students in South Dakota from using bathrooms and locker rooms that did not align with their sex assignment at birth. Later that May, Capitol Hill Seattle Blog—a local news website centering on the Capitol Hill neighborhood of Seattle—covered a local artist who created sigil and glyph art with the intention to "protect trans kids".

The phrase "Protect Trans Kids" became an important slogan and rallying call during protests by trans rights activists in the United States in February 2017, following the Trump administration's revocation of "federal guidance established by the Obama administration that directed schools to allow trans students to use restrooms aligning with their gender identity." The phrase was also used in a high volume as a hashtag (#ProtectTransKids) on Twitter in the days following online rumors and official news reports of the Trump administration's impending rollback. Many public figures and businesses echoed the phrase following the Trump administration's revocation. American singer Ariana Grande, for example, shared a post featuring the "Protect Trans Kids" slogan. The American Civil Liberties Union (ACLU) also used the phrase in their online platforms.

== Use in activism ==
The phrase has been used by transgender rights activists, either on signs or vocally via chants, to protest legislation that would ban gender-affirming healthcare for transgender youth. The phrase is also a common fixture in memes and selfies posted on social media platforms by transgender rights activists speaking out against perceived dangers of trans children toward cisgender children in public restrooms and other facilities.

The use of the phrase on t-shirts has also been noted by media outlets. American schoolteachers have been documented wearing shirts featuring the phrase, in support of their transgender students. Esther Byrd, a member of the Florida Board of Education praised a parent who reported a Tocoi Creek High School teacher as having worn a shirt with the phrase. The teacher did not receive disciplinary action, though changed shirts after the school's principal provided them with another. David Annis, founder of Trans Action Apparel and a Minnesota-based activist, began creating apparel that featured messages supporting transgender and nonbinary individuals, including one shirt featuring the "Protect Trans Kids" phrase. Proceeds from the merchandise being donated to a local LGBTQ advocacy group.

In 2022, American journalist and LGBT rights activist Sue Kerr distributed over 700 signs with the "protect trans kids" phrase throughout Pittsburgh, after a local teenager was the target of transphobic slurs. City councilman Bobby Wilson later proclaimed September 12, 2022, as "Protect Trans Kids Day" in Pittsburgh. In June 2023, a joint transgender rights advocacy effort by the St. Mark's Episcopal Cathedral in Seattle and the ACLU of Washington projected a light display reading "protect trans kids" on a church in Capitol Hill.

Related phrases such as "protect trans youth", "protect trans students", and "protect trans lives" have also been used in similar manners during protest or to share pro–trans rights sentiments. In response to Trump's signing of Executive Order 14187 (titled "Protecting Children from Chemical and Surgical Mutilation"), Washington Senate Majority Leader Jamie Pedersen and Speaker of the House Laurie Jinkins issued a joint statement expressing their intent to "protect transgender youth", citing their role in establishing state-level protections and nondiscrimination laws.

=== By athletes and entertainers ===
Professional athletes and entertainers have been documented wearing clothing sporting the phrase, sometimes as a form of drawing awareness to trans rights issues. One of the earliest instances of this came in 2019 when American actor Don Cheadle wore a black t-shirt with the phrase while hosting on Saturday Night Live. Many viewers positively received Cheadle's statement; the Human Rights Campaign also thanked him in a tweet. Similarly, in February 2023, a member from the American folk rock music duo Indigo Girls wore a t-shirt with the phrase while performing on Tiny Desk Concerts.

During the 2022 SheBelieves Cup, Catarina Macario and Andi Sullivan of the United States women's national soccer team (USWNT) wore athletic tape with the phrase around their wrists. The Athletic noted that the players' gesture occurred on the same day that Texas governor Greg Abbott issued a letter to the Texas Department of Family and Protective Services, asking professionals working with children to report to state authorities regarding the parents of trans children. In June 2023, Minnesota Lynx head coach Cheryl Reeve wore a t-shirt featuring the phrase during a game. The team's social media personnel also posted the phrase in a tweet. Also in June 2023, Seattle Sounders FC sold a scarf with the phrase with proceeds donated to a transgender families support organization. The team's players also posed with the scarf prior to a Major League Soccer (MLS) match. The largest Sounders supporters' group, Emerald City Supporters, also regularly display an "Emerald City Supports Trans Kids" banner at matches. During the 2022 CONCACAF Champions League final at Lumen Field, officials from CONCACAF attempted to remove the banner but were rebuked by Sounders staff.

The phrase has also been used by entertainers aside from wearing it on their clothing. Following the fatal stabbing of Brianna Ghey, a British transgender youth, the phrase was echoed on social media. English singer Yungblud tweeted the phrase, in addition to speaking out against anti-trans sentiments. Actress and comedian Margaret Cho also spoke out about trans issues, stating "We have to protect trans kids' lives" while guest appearing on The View. Wrestler CM Punk stated that he was criticized for sharing an Instagram post from a Chicago-based ice cream company; the post featured the phrase on an ice cream bar's packaging and also served as a fundraising initiative for the Chicago transgender community. Musicians Evan Greer and Ryan Cassata collaborated on a track titled "Protect Trans Kids", which they released to coincide with International Transgender Day of Visibility in 2025.

== Uses in media ==
The phrase was seen in the 2023 animated film Spider-Man: Across the Spider-Verse, featured written on a transgender flag in the room of Gwen Stacy. The appearance of the flag sporting the phrase was cited as a likely reason why the film had its screening pulled from several theaters in Muslim-majority countries in the Middle East.

== Uses by conservatives ==
Writing for National Review, Judson Berger opined that for "sponsors of [...] so-called 'anti-trans' bills" to succeed in passing legislation that calls for "restrictions on medical interventions for minors", they would perhaps have to "adopt, at least in spirit" the "Protect Trans Kids" phrase. Berger additionally cited the opening text of the Idaho bill dubbed the Vulnerable Child Protection Act and wrote "If that's not 'protecting trans kids,' what is?" The opening text of the bill stated that doctors would be barred from "performing surgeries that sterilize or mutilate, or artificially construct tissue with the appearance of genitalia that differs from the child's biological sex." Indeed, upon signing the bill, Idaho's governor Brad Little discussed "protecting minors" from such surgeries or treatment.

== See also ==
- Healthcare and the LGBT community
- Legal status of transgender people
