= Autostraddle =

American online magazine for LGBTQ women

- Website type: Blog, news
- Available in: English
- Owner: For Them
- Founders: Riese Bernard; Alexandra Vega
- CEO: Kylo Freeman
- Website: www.autostraddle.com
- Registration: Optional
- Launched: March 2009
- Current status: Active

Autostraddle is an American online magazine and social network for lesbian, bisexual, and queer women (cis and trans), as well as non-binary people and trans people of all genders. The website is a "politically progressive queer feminist media source" that features content covering LGBTQ and feminist news, politics, opinion, culture, arts and entertainment as well as lifestyle content such as DIY crafting, sex, relationships, fashion, food and technology.

Autostraddle was founded in 2009 by Riese Bernard, the current CEO and CFO, and former Design Director Alexandra Vega. In June 2020, Kamala Puligandla succeeded Bernard as editor-in-chief. In June 2021, Carmen Phillips was named the new editor-in-chief. In August 2023, Autostraddle was acquired by For Them, with Kylo Freeman as CEO. In July 2024, Phillips stepped down as editor-in-chief.

The site received 400,000 unique visitors and 2 million views per month in 2012. In 2016 these numbers had risen to one million unique visitors and 3.5 million views per month. In 2023, the site received 2.5 million unique views per month. The website received GLAAD's Outstanding Blog Award in 2015, and was nominated in 2013, 2014, and 2018.

== History ==
Riese Bernard founded Autostraddle in March 2009 with Alexandra Vega, the website's former Design Director. She wanted to create a website for queer women that was unlike other sites that existed at the time. The initial site focused on the fandom surrounding The L Word, and it was soon viewed as a popular lesbian blog by publications like Rookie and Vice.

Autostraddle became known as a website focusing on queer publishing, especially on stories beyond cisgender men. According to Lauren Theisen, Autostraddle covers similar material to publications like Bitch, The Hairpin, The Toast, and Feministing, although these sites have shut down. Autostraddle also had similarities to AfterEllen and Jezebel before those sites evolved.

In 2012, Autostraddle began hosting a sleepaway camp for queer adults called A-Camp. Concerns by people of color and trans attendees about their treatment at camp by white, cisgender campers and leaders were eventually publicized in 2019. This led to the camp's hiatus and Autostraddle's attempt to diversify their leadership, adding new subject editor positions and appointing the publication's first Black editor-in-chief, Carmen Phillips. Phillips served in the role from 2021 – 2024.

The senior team currently consists of Kylo Freeman, Riese Bernard, and Kayla Kumari Upadhyaya.

In 2025, Autostraddle launched its first print issue.

=== Revenue, funding, and financial status ===
In a 2016 article for Nylon Magazine, founder Riese Bernard discussed Autostraddle's alternative revenue strategies in the context of the rapid disintegration of queer women-oriented publications and online spaces. She has noted that advertisers largely do not buy ad space on the website. Autostraddle's funding model relies heavily on memberships, merchandise, and community fundraising.

In May 2023, Bernard announced that a decline in advertising revenue that began in 2020 had forced Autostraddle to reduce spending by cutting expenses and concluding some independent contractor roles. The independent contractors whose contracts were terminated were given three months of paid notice and invited to remain as team freelance writers. However, the three dismissed contractors were subject editors for the site, and had recently been assured their positions were secure. Other contractors felt their dismissal was poorly communicated and worried about the dismissal of editors who had contributed heavily to diversifying the site, feeling that Autostraddle was not committed to supporting marginalized readers. Many contracted writers stopped contributing to the site in the aftermath.

In August 2023, Autostraddle was acquired by For Them, a company founded in 2021 that designs and manufactures chest binders, and the website was rebranded as "Autostraddle by For Them". The company was founded by Kylo Freeman, who wanted to get involved in publishing after growing their company. They would become Autostraddle's CEO, and also its first Black trans CEO. They began by addressing the publication's recent controversies over funding, the subject editor dismissals, and supporting trans and person-of-color readership. Some immediate reactions from readers included relief about the site's continuation, worry over the influence of venture capital firms and user data privacy, and upset over an interview between Freeman and Bernard. After the sale, all full-time staff remained with Autostraddle, and Bernard stayed on in an editorial role, Carmen Phillips remained as then editor-in-chief, and Kayla Kumari remained as managing editor.

== Content ==
Autostraddle publishes content on relationship dynamics, radical queer politics, economic injustice, among other things. In 2019, Riese Bernard and Buffering the Vampire Slayer's Kristin Russo started To L and Back, a podcast recapping every single episode of The L Word in order, one by one. Filmmaker Carly Usdin took over for Russo as co-host starting in season 2, and the show began featuring regular special guests.

=== Queer Girl City Guides ===
As part of their travel section, Autostraddle began publishing Queer Girl City Guides in 2012. Queer Girl City Guides are user-created, Autostraddle-approved guides to cities in the United States and abroad for queer women moving to or traveling to a new city. The guides discuss places to dance, eat, drink, be entertained, party, play sports, get an "alternative lifestyle haircut" or tattoo, celebrate pride, purchase LGBTQ books and publications, participate in activism, and more. The guides also provide insight on local colleges, gayborhoods and neighborhoods or places to avoid. Some guides also include sections on trans culture.

=== Autostraddle TV Awards ===
Starting in September 2018, Autostraddle has held the Autostraddle TV Awards (formerly the "Gay Emmys" and "Queer TV Awards"), in which readers and contributors annually vote for their favorite LGBT-inclusive television broadcasts.

== Events ==
Autostraddle hosts in-person events such as "Holigay Meet-Ups" and its Pride Meet-Up Month, which are organized by users with Autostraddle's support and promotion. Autostraddle also offers ideas, tips, and resources for hosting a meet-up.

=== A-Camp ===
In April 2012, the first A-Camp was held as a pilot at Alpine Meadows Retreat Center in Angelus Oaks, California, where 163 queer campers and 35 staff members attended. A-Camps include various panels, workshops, discussion groups, classes, entertainment and other activities. Subsequent A-Camps have been larger, with between 300–400 campers in attendance per camp, including staff, and have taken place in the same location in California in September 2012, May 2013, October 2013, May 2014, May 2015 and June 2016. A-Camp took place in Wisconsin in October 2016 and May 2017, and the event moved to Ojai, California in May 2018. As of July 2022, A-Camp has been put on hiatus due to the COVID-19 pandemic.

Special guests at A-Camp have included Mary Lambert, Cameron Esposito, River Butcher, Julie Goldman, Brandy Howard, Be Steadwell, Mara Wilson, Gabe Dunn, DeAnne Smith, Hannah Hart, Somer Bingham, Lex Kennedy, Megan Benton, Mal Blum, Dan Owens-Reid, Kristin Russo, Jasika Nicole, Jenny Owen Youngs, Julia Nunes, Brittani Nichols, Mollie Thomas, Haviland Stillwell, Ashley Reed, and Sarah Croce. WNYC's podcast Nancy featured A-Camp in the episode "Kathy Goes to Camp".

== Accolades ==
In the 2012 Weblog Awards, Autostraddle was awarded Best Weblog of The Year, Best Group/Community Weblog and Best Entertainment Weblog. Autostraddle was nominated for GLAAD's Outstanding Blog Award in 2013, 2014, and 2018, and won in 2015. One of their articles,"105 Trans Women On American TV: A History and Analysis" by Riese Bernard, was nominated for a GLAAD Media Award in the category of Outstanding Digital Journalism in 2017.

A 2024 Australian Feminist Studies article argued that Autostraddle is "incorporating feminist and queer theory to (re)envision a more equitable digital future."

== See also ==
- AfterEllen
- GO
- The Ladder
- Homosocialization
