= Julie Ronnie =

American television actress

- Occupation: Television actress
- Years active: 1984–1989

Julie Ronnie is an American television actress. She is best known for playing Laken Lockridge in the American soap opera television series Santa Barbara from 1984 to 1985.

== Life and career ==
Ronnie attended Redondo Union High School, and was an exchange student in Japan. While at high school, she began appearing in commercials. She began her screen career in 1984, playing Laken Lockridge in the NBC soap opera television series Santa Barbara. Her final appearance on Santa Barbara was on September 12, 1985, after which she guest-starred on television programs including Dallas, The Love Boat, Trapper John, M.D., Hotel, T.J. Hooker, Matlock, Knight Rider and Private Eye.

In 1989, Ronnie starred as Nurse Alice Swanson in the ABC medical drama television series HeartBeat, in its second season.
