= Impact Media =

American social media company

- Trade name: Impact
- Founded: June 2020; 6 years ago
- Founders: Tim Chau; Michelle Chau Andrews; Joelene Latief
- Website: impact.site

Impact Media is an American social media publisher that produces news and social-issue content for Generation Z readers, mainly on Instagram. Cousins Tim Chau and Michelle Andrews started the account in June 2020 and built it into a company with a staff of twelve. The account had about 2.5 million Instagram followers as of May 2025.

== History ==
Impact launched in June 2020, founded by Chau, Andrews, and Joelene Latief, during the COVID-19 pandemic and the protests that followed the murder of George Floyd. Chau and Andrews, cousins who had been running Instagram accounts together since 2013, started it from the backyard of their apartment while studying at the University of California, Berkeley. Chau told Inc. that young readers wanted "to take action and share resources with their friends" rather than only read about issues.

Forbes named the cofounders to its 30 Under 30 list for 2022 in the media category in November 2021, reporting that Impact was reaching more than 10 million people a month and that its campaigns had registered thousands of young voters and driven hundreds of thousands of petition signatures on issues including climate change and abortion rights. By December 2022 the account had passed 2.2 million followers and the company had raised more than $1.4 million for causes it covered. Inc. profiled the company that month in its Best in Business feature.

Impact took on brand partnerships, including with the search engine Ecosia. During the Russian invasion of Ukraine, it paired its coverage with Instagram's in-app donation feature to route readers toward humanitarian aid organizations. As of May 2025 the account had roughly 2.5 million followers and twelve staff working across brand partnerships, live events, video, and editorial and social content. Chau serves as chief executive officer and Andrews as chief content officer. In 2026 Chau was named one of ten New Gold honorees on Gold House's Gold100 list.

== Content ==
Impact publishes news explainers and commentary in Instagram's carousel format, alongside coverage of culture and current events. Inc. described representative posts on the environmental costs of fast fashion and on how to register to vote. The posts share a consistent visual treatment built on saturated color and collaged photography set in sans serif type.

Steffi Cao of Teen Vogue compared the company's role for Generation Z to that of Vice Media and BuzzFeed for millennials, writing that Impact lets Gen Z readers cover their own culture. Andrews told Cao that short-form posts let the company reach readers "in a way that felt accessible to them," and said the company has since begun publishing longer pieces as its audience has aged.
