= The Buckeye Flame =

Online news website

- Type: online newspaper; website
- Owner: The Buckeye Flame
- Founder: Ken Schneck
- Founded: 2020
- Language: English
- Headquarters: Ohio
- Website: https://thebuckeyeflame.com

The Buckeye Flame is a state-wide LGBTQ community-oriented online news website based in northern Ohio. The website updates online regularly, and news recaps are distributed in a weekly newsletter, which makes this the largest LGBTQ news source in the state of Ohio. The website debuted in June 2020.

== History ==
The Buckeye Flame launched in 2020, and this followed the closure of Ohio's printed LGBTQ news magazine, Prizm.

Since its creation, The Buckeye Flame has published LGBTQ news articles on a number of topics. Topics have included gender affirming care, conversion therapy bans, LGBTQ sports content, and more. Additionally, The Buckeye Flame regularly covers content related to anti-LGBTQ legislation at the local and state-wide level across Ohio.

The Buckeye Flame is associated with several professional organizations, including the Institute for Nonprofit News, other journalist groups, and Ohio's LGBTQ chamber of commerce. Occasionally, they co-publish higher profile material with other Ohio-based sources, such as The Cleveland Scene.
