= Riese Bernard =

American writer and digital media executive

- Born: Marie Lyn Bernard; 1981 (age 44–45)

Marie Lyn Bernard (born 1981), known professionally as Riese Bernard is an American writer and digital media executive. She is best known as the co-founder of the lesbian and queer women's interest website Autostraddle which she led until its acquisition by For Them in 2023 after which she remained with the site in an editorial and development role. Bernard received a 2017 GLAAD Media Award nomination for her article "105 Trans Women On American TV: A History and Analysis."

== Early life and education ==
Bernard was born and raised in Michigan. Her father, Victor L. Bernard, a scholar, researcher and professor in the field of financial statement analysis, died of a heart attack when she was 14 years old. Her mother came out to her as gay shortly after her father's death.

She graduated from Interlochen Arts Academy in 1999 with a major in creative writing. After graduating from University of Michigan with a bachelor's degree in English in 2003, she moved to New York City to pursue a career in writing.

== Career ==
In 2007, Bernard created The Road Best Straddled, a spin-off of her personal blog This Girl Called Automatic Win, to recap The L Word, then in its fourth season. This led to collaborations with The L Word Online and Showtime and her blogs gained sizeable followings. She also interned at the now-defunct website Nerve and worked for the Donald Maass Literary Agency.

Bernard has published writing in Marie Claire, Curve, GO, Queerty, Bitch, Jezebel and Emily Books. Her article “105 Trans Women On American TV: A History and Analysis” was nominated for a 2017 GLAAD Media Award. In 2018, Bernard's profile of Hayley Kiyoko was the cover story for Nylon's first-ever Pride Issue.

=== Autostraddle ===
At the end of the final season of The L Word in 2009, she created Autostraddle.com with her then-girlfriend Alex Vega, with the intention of creating a digital website focused on gay women. Bernard stated she was inspired to create the website because nothing else like it existed at the time. The website received a GLAAD Media Award in 2015 and receives 4 million unique page views per month as of 2015. In 2012, she created A-Camp, an annual 5-day "curated conference/camp/retreat combo" for queer women and trans people, located in Ojai, California.

=== Leadership and acquisition ===
By February 2021, Bernard had stepped down as Autostraddle's editor-in-chief but remained its CEO and co-founder. In August 2023, Autostraddle was acquired in an all-equity deal by For Them, a New York-based company and became "Autostraddle by For Them". For Them founder Kylo Freeman became CEO, the site's first Black CEO and Bernard stayed on in an editorial and development capacity. Announcing the deal, Bernard said she was glad to move out of leadership and back to writing, editing and podcasting while working with the new CEO on strategic development. She continues to write for the site.

== Personal life ==
Bernard first began to identify as a bisexual, and then as a lesbian, in her twenties. Bernard is Jewish. She is divorced and lives in Los Angeles.

== Accolades ==
- 2010 – 100 Women We Love, GO
- 2011 – 100 Women We Love, GO
- 2016 – 100 Women We Love, GO
- 2017 – GLAAD Media Award (nomination), GLAAD
- 2018 – Queero, Them
