= Be Steadwell =

American singer songwriter

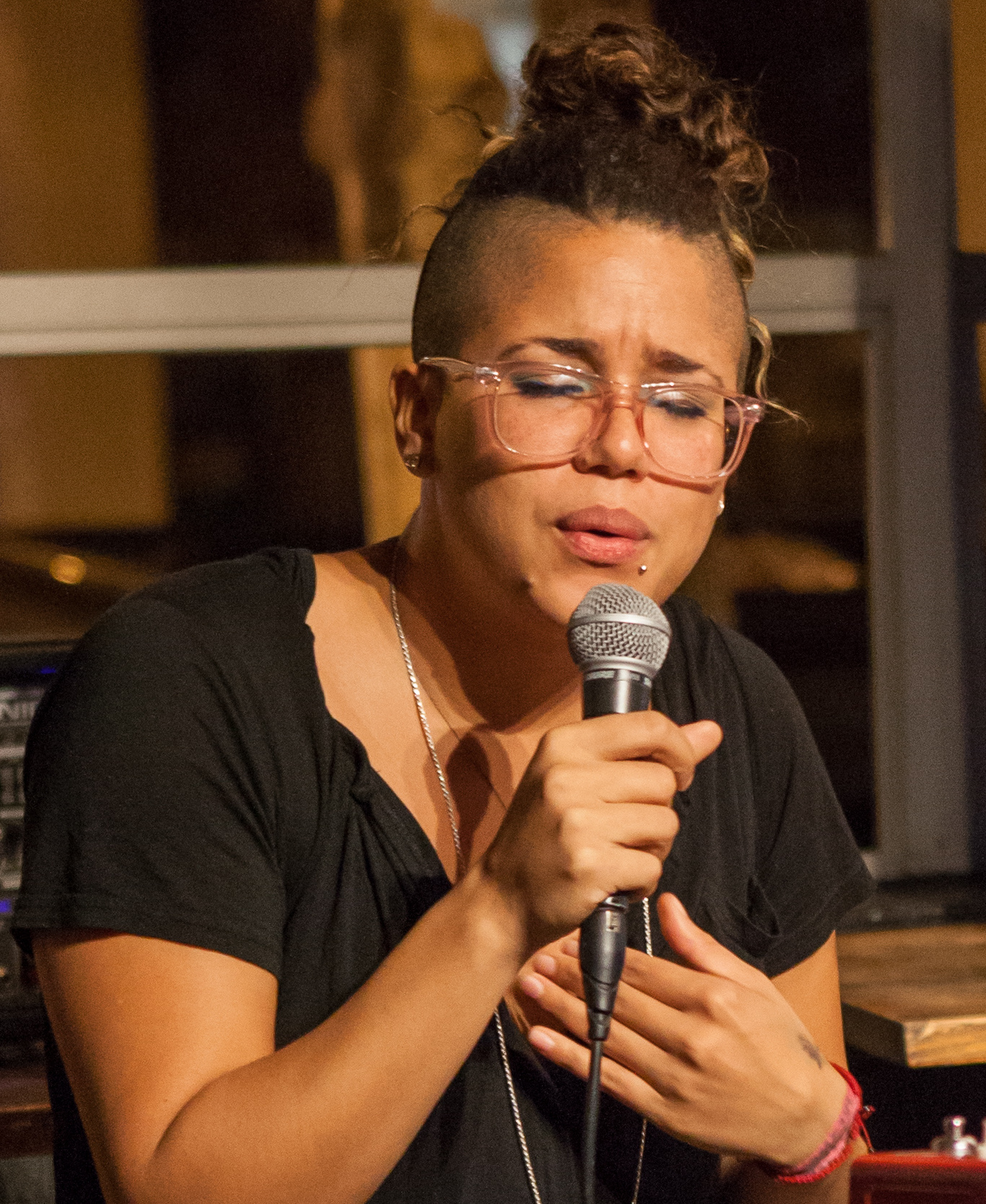

Background information
- Origin: Washington D.C., U.S.
- Genres: R&B; Queer Pop
- Years active: 2010-present
- Website: www.besteadwell.com

Be Steadwell (sometimes stylized as be steadwell) is a singer-songwriter and filmmaker from Washington, D.C. She is best known for producing a genre of music she calls "Queer Pop".

Steadwell produced the film Vow of Silence (2014), which received Best Experimental Short at the Black Star Film Festival.

She released the EP Succulent in April 2020.

== Early life and education ==
Be Steadwell was born and raised in Washington, D.C. She is the youngest of four children.

Steadwell attended The Field School. She began singing at age 14 when she joined the jazz band.

She received her BA from Oberlin College and a MFA in film from Howard University.

== Career ==
=== Music ===
Steadwell released weekly music videos on YouTube while at Howard. She released her first album, Queer Pop Mixtape in 2013, for which she gained wider prominence.

Steadwell sang at the 2017 Women's March on the National Mall behind Maxwell and Janelle Monáe in Toshi Reagon's Big Lovely Band.

Steadwell released an album called Queer Love Songs in June 2018. She described the album as “a collection of love songs I’ve written in the past ten years from my perspective as a super queer black woman who loves love.”

In April 2020 she released the EP Succulent. Steadwell stated that the album focuses on her enjoyment of sex. The sound was described as R&B, hip-hop, pop, and electronica.

=== Other work ===
She produced the 2014 film, Vow of Silence, during her MFA program. It received the Howard University Paul Robeson Award (2015), Best Experimental Short at The Black Star Film Festival (2015), Audience Choice Award at the QWOCMAP Film Festival (2015), and was featured at the NYC Schomburg Center for Research in Black Culture.

In 2016 she was selected to be a Strathmore Artist in Residence and the DC Commission on the Arts awarded Be an artist fellowship.

In 2018, she released a musical titled A Letter to My Ex which tackled themes of love, loss, and intimacy.

In 2025, Be released their debut novel, Chocolate Chip City, an exploration of the love lives of Black women in modern-day D.C.

== Artistry ==
=== Musical style ===
Steadwell self-produces her music, which is known for its lyrics and LGBTQIA+ content. She makes music that she refers to as "queer pop", and has stated the importance of that specificity.

AfterEllen described her sound as "multi-layered but lofi" Her songs also frequently have political themes. She wrote a song called "Gay Sex" in response to the Charlottesville Unite the Right rally.

=== Stage ===
Steadwell uses loop pedals to layer vocals and beatboxing live onstage, and sometimes plays guitar.

=== Music videos ===
Steadwell releases music videos on YouTube under the moniker "Be Steadwell". The channel had around 17,000 subscribers as of May 2025.

== Personal life ==
Steadwell is queer, describing herself as "gender-apathetic".

== Discography ==
=== Albums ===
- Queer Pop Mixtape (2013)
- RainWater EP (2013)
- Songaday (2014)
- Notes. Acoustic Love Songs (2015)
- SongaDay (2015)
- Jaded (2016)
- Breakup Songs (2017)
- Queer Love Songs (2018)
- Succulent (2020)
- Dear Ex, The Musical (2024)
