= 30th GLAAD Media Awards =

Annual US media awards ceremony

- Date: March 28, 2019; May 4, 2019

The 30th GLAAD Media Awards is the 2019 annual presentation of the GLAAD Media Awards, presented by GLAAD honoring the 2018 media season. The awards honor films, television shows, musicians and works of journalism that fairly, accurately and inclusively represent the LGBT community and issues relevant to the community. GLAAD announced the 151 nominees split across 27 categories on January 25, 2019 in Park City, Utah. Some of the awards were presented in Los Angeles on March 28, 2019 and the remaining awards were presented in New York City on May 4, 2019.

== Category changes ==
Unlike in previous ceremonies, the 30th GLAAD Media Awards did not include the Outstanding Daily Drama category, while the award for Outstanding Video Game was presented for the first time. Additionally, Outstanding Talk Show Episode award was renamed the Outstanding Variety or Talk Show Episode. In order to reflect increased cinematic representation, GLAAD expanded the number of potential nominees in both film categories from five to ten nominees.

== Winners and nominees ==
Winners are presented in bold.

=== Film ===
**Outstanding Film – Wide Release**: **Love, Simon (20th Century Fox)**; Blockers (Universal Studios); Crazy Rich Asians (Warner Bros.); Deadpool 2 (20th Century Fox); The Girl in the Spider's Web (Sony Pictures)	**Outstanding Film – Limited Release**: **Boy Erased (Focus Features)**; 1985 (Wolfe Releasing); A Kid Like Jake (IFC Films); Can You Ever Forgive Me? (Fox Searchlight Pictures); Disobedience (Bleecker Street); The Favourite (Fox Searchlight Pictures); Hearts Beat Loud (Gunpowder & Sky); The Miseducation of Cameron Post (FilmRise); Saturday Church (Samuel Goldwyn Films); We the Animals (The Orchard)

=== Television ===
**Outstanding Comedy Series**: **Vida (Starz)**; Brooklyn Nine-Nine (Fox); Crazy Ex-Girlfriend (The CW); Dear White People (Netflix); Modern Family (ABC); One Day at a Time (Netflix); Schitt's Creek (Pop); Superstore (NBC); This Close (SundanceNow); Will & Grace (NBC)	**Outstanding Drama Series**: **Pose (FX)**; Billions (Showtime); Black Lightning (The CW); Grey's Anatomy (ABC); The Handmaid's Tale (Hulu); Instinct (CBS); Shadowhunters (Freeform); Star (Fox); Supergirl (The CW); Wynonna Earp (Syfy)
**Outstanding Individual Episode** **(in a series without a regular LGBT character)**: **"Someplace Other Than Here" - The Guest Book (TBS)**; "King in the North" - Fresh Off the Boat (ABC); "Prom" - Fuller House (Netflix); "Service" - Law and Order: S.V.U. (NBC); "She" - The Good Doctor (ABC)	**Outstanding TV Movie or Limited Series**: **The Assassination of Gianni Versace: American Crime Story (FX)**; American Horror Story: Apocalypse (FX); Life-Size 2 (Freeform); Sense8 (Netflix); A Very English Scandal (Amazon Prime)
**Outstanding Kids & Family Programming**: **Steven Universe (Cartoon Network)**; Adventure Time (Cartoon Network); Andi Mack (Disney Channel); Anne with an E (Netflix); She-Ra and the Princesses of Power (Netflix)	**Outstanding Documentary**: **Believer (HBO)**; Calling Her Ganda (Breaking Glass Pictures); My House (Viceland); Quiet Heroes (Logo); When the Beat Drops (Logo)
**Outstanding Reality Program**: **Queer Eye (Netflix)**; American Idol (ABC); I Am Jazz (TLC); Love & Hip Hop (VH1); RuPaul's Drag Race (VH1)	**Outstanding Variety or Talk Show Episode**: **"Trans Rights Under Attack" - Full Frontal with Samantha Bee (TBS)**; "Mike Pence and A Day in the Life of Marlon Bundo" - Last Week Tonight with John Oliver (HBO); "NRA Problems, Chicken Bone Problems, Birmingham Problems" - Wyatt Cenac's Problem Areas (HBO); "Troye Sivan Hopes Boy Erased Reaches All Parents" - The Late Show with Stephen Colbert (CBS); "Valedictorian Seth Owen" - The Ellen DeGeneres Show (NBC)
**Outstanding Scripted Television Series (Spanish-Language)**: **Élite (Netflix)**; **Mi marido tiene más familia (Univision)**; Mi familia perfecta (Telemundo); Papá a toda madre (Univision)	

=== Journalism ===
Award	Nominees
Outstanding Digital Journalism Article	**"Bermuda Same-sex Marriage Ban Means Trouble for Tourism and Cruise Ships" by Ryan Ruggiero** **(CNBC.com)**; "Across U.S., LGBTQ Christians Try to Change Hearts and Minds From the Pews" by Julie Compton (NBCNews.com); "Deadnamed" by Lucas Waldron and Ken Schwencke (ProPublica); "LGBTQ Caravan Migrants Marry While Waiting for Asylum in Tijuana" by Sarah Kinosian (INTOmore.com); "Workplaces Need to Prepare for the Non-Binary Future" by Samantha Allen (The Daily Beast)
Outstanding Digital Journalism - Multimedia	**"March for Our Lives and LGBT activism: 'They're definitely linked for me,' says Emma González" by Beth Greenfield (Yahoo! Lifestyle)**; "I Was Jailed for Raising the Pride Flag in Egypt" by Amro Helmy (BuzzFeedVideo); "The Latinx Drag Queens Spearheading HIV Activism on the Border" by Paola Ramos (Vice.com); "Marielle and Monica: The LGBT Activists Resisting Bolsonaro's Brazil" by Fabio Erdos, Marina Costa, Charlie Phillips and Jacqueline Edenbrow (TheGuardian.com); "Trans Model Aaron Philip is Making a Space for Disabilities on the Runway" (NowThis News)
Outstanding TV Journalism Newsmagazine	**"Conversion Therapy: God Only Knows" - CBS Sunday Morning**; "Gender: The Space Between" - CBS News; "Legacy of Hope" - Nightline; "Respect" - SC Featured; "South Texas Pride" - KSAT News
Outstanding Newspaper Article	**"He Took a Drug to Prevent AIDS. Then He Couldn't Get Disability Insurance." by Donald G. McNeil Jr. (The New York Times)**; "LGBTQ Parents Challenge Stereotypes in China" by Sue-Lin Wong and Jason Lee (Reuters); "'More Than Fear': Brazil's LGBT Community Dreads Looming Bolsonaro Presidency" by Marina Lopes (The Washington Post); "Pistons' Reggie Bullock to Transgender Community: 'I see y'all as people that I love'" by Malika Andrews (Chicago Tribune); "Transgender Students Asked Betsy DeVos for Help. Here's What Happened." by Caitlin Emma (Politico)
Outstanding Magazine Article	**"Can a Transgender Woman Get Justice in Texas?" by Nate Blakeslee (Texas Monthly)**; "21 Transgender Stars, Creators Sound Off on Hollywood: 'I Want to Portray These Characters, and I'm Ready'" by Chris Gardner, Rebecca Sun, Lindsay Weinberg, Joelle Goldstein and Bryan White (The Hollywood Reporter); "Ex-Scientologist Michelle LeClair Says Church Officials Humiliated Her After She Came Out as Gay" by Johnny Dodd and Tierney McAfee (People); "Lena Waithe is Changing the Game" by Jacqueline Woodson (Vanity Fair); "They are the Champions" by Katie Barnes (ESPN The Magazine)
Outstanding Magazine Overall Coverage	**Variety**; Billboard; Ebony; Entertainment Weekly; GQ
Outstanding TV Journalism Segment	**"Same-sex Couple Reacts to Supreme Court Ruling" - CNN Tonight with Don Lemon**; "Historic Number of LGBTQ Candidates on Ballots This Year" - NBC Nightly News; "Mississippi Town Denies Pride Parade" - Vice News Tonight; "Olympian Adam Rippon" - New Day; "Trump: 'Looking Very Seriously' at Changing Transgender Definition" - Velshi & Ruhle; **"Primera Pareja Gay en Casarse en un Consulado Mexicano" Noticias Telemundo Mediodía (Telemundo)**; "Entrevista con Pat 'Cacahuate' Manuel" NoticiasYa Tampa Bay (Univision); "LAFC Pride Republic" Noticiero Univision Los Angeles (Univision); "Madre hispana lucha contra un agresivo cáncer seno" Noticias Univision Arizona (Univision); "Transpesina" Univision 21 Fresno (Univision)

=== Other ===
Award	Nominees
Outstanding Blog	**Pittsburgh Lesbian Correspondents**; Gays With Kids; Holy Bullies and Headless Monsters; My Fabulous Disease; TransGriot
Outstanding Comic Book	**Exit, Stage Left!: The Snagglepuss Chronicles (DC Comics)**; Batwoman (DC Comics); Bingo Love (Image Comics); Fence (Boom! Studios); Iceman (Marvel Comics); Lumberjanes: The Infernal Compass (Boom! Studios); Oh Sh#!t It's Kim & Kim (Black Mask Comics); Runaways (Marvel Comics); Star Wars: Doctor Aphra (Marvel Comics); Strangers in Paradise XXV (Abstract Studios)
Outstanding Music Artist	**Janelle Monáe - Dirty Computer**; Brandi Carlile - By the Way, I Forgive You; Brockhampton - Iridescence; Christine and the Queens - Chris; Hayley Kiyoko - Expectations; Kim Petras - Turn Off the Light, Vol. 1; Shea Diamond - Seen It All; Sophie - Oil of Every Pearl's Un-Insides; Troye Sivan - Bloom; Years & Years - Palo Santo
Outstanding Video Game	**The Elder Scrolls Online: Summerset (Bethesda Softworks)**; Assassin's Creed Odyssey (Ubisoft); Guild Wars 2: Path of Fire (ArenaNet); Pillars of Eternity II: Deadfire (Versus Evil); The Sims Mobile (Electronic Arts)

=== Special Recognition ===
- **Nanette** (Netflix)
- **TransMilitary** (Logo)

=== Special Honors ===
- Advocate for Change Award: Madonna
- Stephen F. Kolzak Award: Sean Hayes
- Vanguard Award: Beyoncé and Jay-Z
- Vito Russo Award: Andy Cohen

== Bohemian Rhapsody controversy ==
Before the nominees were announced on January 25, 2019, the awards generated headlines when GLAAD announced that Bohemian Rhapsody, the 2018 biopic of Freddie Mercury and Queen which had, at that point, been nominated for several Academy Awards including Best Picture, was being withdrawn from consideration because of sexual misconduct allegations made against its director Bryan Singer. GLAAD issued a statement explaining that it was a "difficult decision" but added that "This week's story in The Atlantic documenting unspeakable harms endured by young men and teenage boys brought to light a reality that cannot be ignored or even tacitly rewarded. Singer's response to The Atlantic story wrongfully used ‘homophobia’ to deflect from sexual assault allegations and GLAAD urges the media and the industry at large to not gloss over the fact that survivors of sexual assault should be put first. The team that worked so hard on Bohemian Rhapsody as well as the legacy of Freddy Mercury deserve so much more than to be tainted in this way".
