= Sue Kerr =

American writer and activist

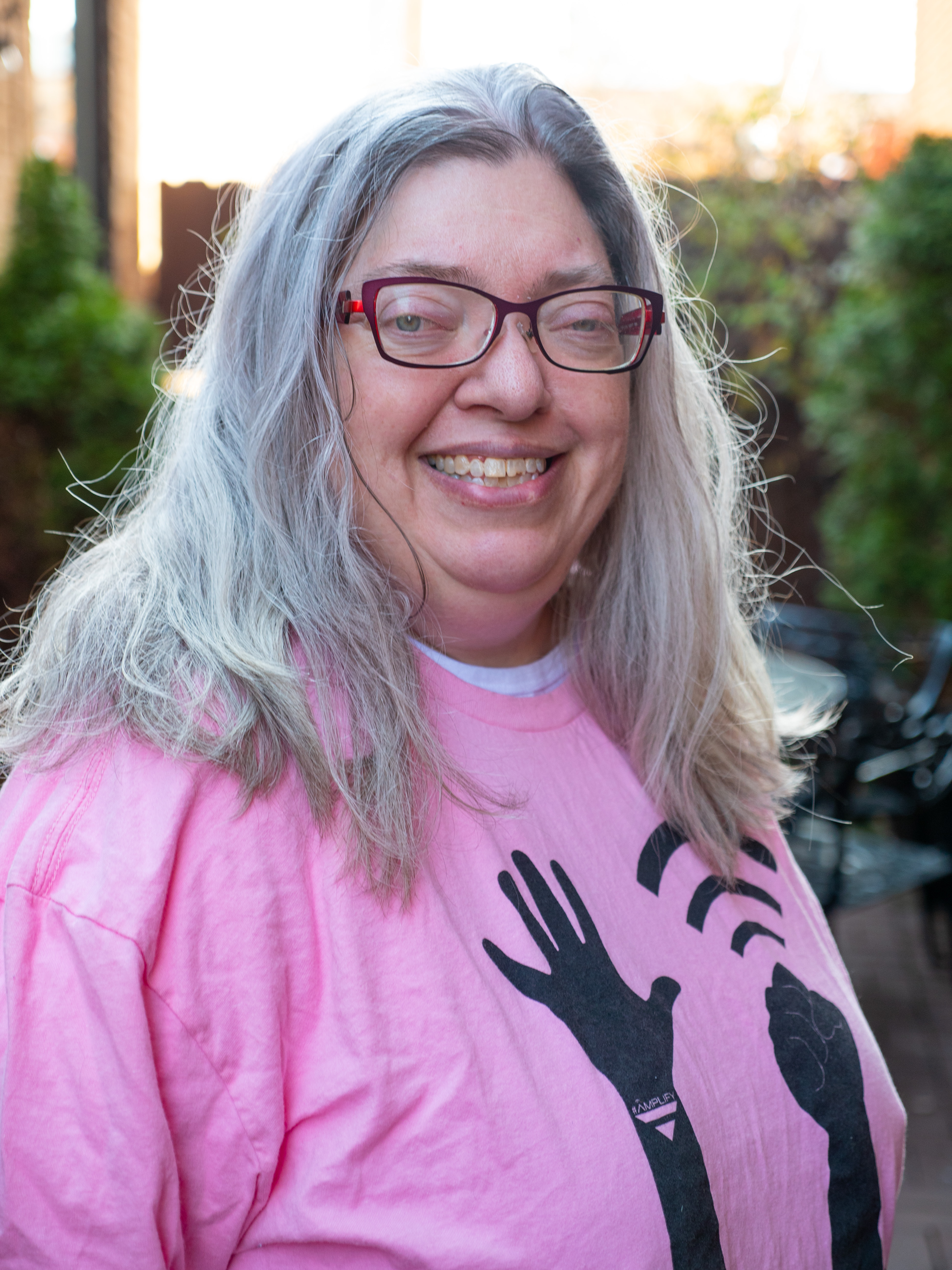
- Sue Kerr in 2019
- Born: 1971 (age 54–55); Pittsburgh, Pennsylvania, U.S.
- Occupations: Writer, activist
- Writing career
- Language: English
- Years active: 2004–present
- Genre: Non-fiction
- Subjects: Disability, LGBT
- Notable awards: GLAAD OUTstanding LGBTQ Blogger
- Website: pghlesbian.com

Sue Kerr is an American journalist best known for covering LGBT community with her blog Pittsburgh Lesbian Correspondents for nearly two decades. Her work has earned multiple GLAAD Media Awards. Kerr is also a national advocate for disability and LGBT rights.

== About ==
Sue Kerr lives the Manchester neighborhood of Pittsburgh, PA. She founded Pittsburgh Lesbian Correspondents in 2005 and serves its primary journalist. She is regarded as an important voice on LGBT issues in Pennsylvania politics. Kerr lives with a disability; it is a common topic of her writing and activism.

Kerr married her longtime partner on February 2, 2021. They had been together for 19 years prior. The pandemic wedding was co-officiated by former Mayor of Pittsburgh Bill Peduto.

== Activism ==
In 2012, Kerr founded a campaign to reduce waste by stocking food pantries with reusable tote bags.

In the summer of 2022, Kerr distributed over 700 “Protect Trans Kids” yard signs after a Pittsburgh teenager was the target of transphobic slurs. Kerr's sign campaign successfully brought attention to youth transgender rights movement. By that Fall, the City of Pittsburgh proclaimed September 12, 2022 'Protect Trans Kids Day' which was drafted with the help of three LGBTQ teens.

== Awards ==
- Pittsburgh City Paper - Best Blogger 2016
- 30th GLAAD Media Awards - Outstanding Blog 2019
- Pittsburgh City Paper - Best Blogger 2019
- 33rd GLAAD Media Awards - Outstanding Blog 2022
- The Advocate - 2022 People Of The Year
