= GO (American magazine) =

Lesbian magazine

- June/July 2010 cover
- Editor: Dayna Troisi
- Founder: Amy Lesser
- Founded: 2001
- Country: USA
- Based in: New York City
- Website: gomag.com

GO (previously GO NYC) is a "cultural roadmap for the city girl," and a free, lesbian magazine. Based out of New York City, the publication offers information on nightlife, arts and entertainment, news and current events, lifestyle, travel, advice, and celebrity Q&As.

GO was founded in 2001 by publisher Amy Lesser.

== See also ==
- LGBT culture in New York City
