= 28th GLAAD Media Awards =

Annual US media awards ceremony

- Date: April 1, 2017; May 6, 2017

The 28th GLAAD Media Awards was the 2017 annual presentation of the GLAAD Media Awards, presented by GLAAD honoring the 2016 season. The awards honor films, television shows, musicians and works of journalism that fairly and accurately represent the LGBT community and issues relevant to the community. GLAAD announced 115 nominees in 21 English-language categories and 41 Spanish-language nominees in 11 categories on January 31, 2017. The awards were presented at ceremonies in Los Angeles on April 1, 2017 and New York on May 6, 2017.

== Winners and nominees ==
Winners are presented in bold.

=== English-language categories ===
Award	Nominees
Outstanding Film - Wide Release	**Moonlight**; Star Trek Beyond
Outstanding Film - Limited Release	**Other People**; The Handmaiden; Naz & Maalik; Spa Night; Those People
Outstanding Comedy Series	**Transparent**; Brooklyn Nine-Nine; Crazy Ex-Girlfriend; Grace and Frankie; Modern Family; One Mississippi; The Real O'Neals; Steven Universe; Survivor's Remorse; Take My Wife
Outstanding Drama Series	**Shadowhunters**; The Fosters; Grey's Anatomy; Hap and Leonard; How to Get Away with Murder; The OA; Orphan Black; Shameless; Supergirl; Wynonna Earp
Outstanding Individual Episode (in a series without a regular LGBT character)	**"San Junipero", Black Mirror**; "Attention Deficit", The Loud House; "Bar Fights", Drunk History; "Johnson & Johnson", Black-ish; "Vegan Cinderella", Easy
Outstanding TV Movie or Limited Series	**Eyewitness**; London Spy; Looking: The Movie; The Rocky Horror Picture Show: Let's Do the Time Warp Again; Vicious: The Finale
Outstanding Documentary	**Southwest of Salem: The Story of the San Antonio Four**; Mapplethorpe: Look at the Pictures; Out of Iraq; The Same Difference; The Trans List
Outstanding Reality Program	**Strut**; Gaycation; I Am Cait; I Am Jazz; The Prancing Elites Project
Outstanding Music Artist	**Tegan and Sara, Love You to Death**; Against Me!, Shape Shift with Me; Blood Orange, Freetown Sound; Brandy Clark, Big Day in a Small Town; Tyler Glenn, Excommunication; Ty Herndon, House on Fire; Elton John, Wonderful Crazy Night; Lady Gaga, Joanne; Frank Ocean, Blonde; Sia, This Is Acting
Outstanding Comic Book	**The Woods, written by James Tynion IV**; All-New X-Men, written by Dennis Hopeless; Black Panther, written by Ta-Nehisi Coates; DC Comics Bombshells, written by Marguerite Bennett; Kim & Kim, written by Magdalene Visaggio; Love is Love, anthology originated by Marc Andreyko; Lumberjanes, written by Shannon Watters, Kat Leyh; Midnighter / Midnighter and Apollo, written by Steve Orlando; Patsy Walker, A.K.A Hellcat!, written by Kate Leth; Saga, written by Brian K. Vaughan
Outstanding Daily Drama	**The Bold and The Beautiful**
Outstanding Talk Show Episode	**"Angelica Ross", The Daily Show with Trevor Noah**; "Cookie Johnson", Super Soul Sunday; "North Carolina and Georgia Anti-LGBTQ Laws", Late Night with Seth Meyers; "Tony Marrero, Orlando Shooting Survivor", The Ellen DeGeneres Show; "Trey Pearson", The View
Outstanding Journalism Newsmagazine	"Bingham", SC Featured; **"Church and States", VICE News Tonight**; "Gavin Grimm's Fight", VICE News Tonight; "Life as Matt", E:60; "Switching Teams", 60 Minutes
Outstanding Journalism Segment	**"Gay Community in U.S. 'Forged in Fire", The Rachel Maddow Show**; "Interview with Florida Attorney General Pam Bondi", Anderson Cooper 360; "Many in LGBT Community Fear Changes under Trump", NBC Nightly News; "Terror in Orlando", PBS NewsHour; "Troop Turnaround: U.S. Military Transgender Ban Ended by Pentagon", CBS This Morning
Outstanding Newspaper Article	**"Permission to Hate" by Elizabeth Leland, The Charlotte Observer**; "An LGBT Hunger Crisis" by Roni Caryn Rabin, The New York Times; "Mid-South Couples Celebrate First Year of Marriage Equality, But Challenges Remain for LGBT Community" by Katie Fretland & Ron Maxey, The Commercial Appeal; "Nowhere to Go: LGBT Youth on the Move" by Arielle Dreher, Jackson Free Press; "Worthy of Survival" by Kathleen McGrory, Tampa Bay Times
Outstanding Magazine Article	**"HIV Mystery: Solved?" by Tim Murphy, The Nation**; "Battle of the Bathroom" by Michael Scherer, Time; "The Official Coming-Out Party" by Kevin Arnovitz, ESPN The Magazine; "On the Run" by Jacob Kushner, Vice Magazine; "Rethinking Gender" by Robin Marantz Henig, National Geographic
Outstanding Magazine Overall Coverage	**Teen Vogue**; The Advocate; Cosmopolitan; Seventeen; Time
Outstanding Digital Journalism Article	**"After the Orlando Shooting, the Changed Lives of Gay Latinos" by Daniel Wenger**; "105 Trans Women On American TV: A History and Analysis" by Riese Bernard; "The Methodist Church May Split Over LGBT Issues. Meet the Lesbian Bishop Caught in the Middle" by Becca Andrews; "These are the Queer Refugees Australia has Locked Up on a Remote Pacific Island" by J. Lester Feder; "The Uncertain Olympic Future for Trans and Intersex Athletes" by Diana Tourjee
Outstanding Digital Journalism - Multimedia	**"Unerased: Counting Transgender Lives" by Meredith Talusan**; "Last Men Standing: AIDS Survivors Still Fighting for Their Lives" by Erin Allday; "New Deep South: Kayla"; "No Access: Young, Black & Positive"; "Willing and Able: Employment as a Transgender New Yorker" by Jordi Oliveres & Santiago García Muñoz
Outstanding Blog	**Holy Bullies and Headless Monsters**; I'm Still Josh; Mombian; My Fabulous Disease; TransGriot
Special Recognition	**Her Story**; **We've Been Around**
