= Gays With Kids =

Same Sex Parenting website

- Company type: Digital media & Social network
- Founded: 2014
- Founders: Brian Rosenberg & Ferd van Gameren
- Editor: David Dodge
- Industry: LGBT

Gays With Kids is a digital media resource and social network space dedicated exclusively to helping gay, bi and trans (GBT) men become dads and navigate fatherhood.

== History ==
Gays With Kids was founded in 2014 with the goal of inspiring, informing and guiding gay, bi and trans men throughout their journey of family building, and supporting them to live their best authentic lives as they explore fatherhood.

The GWK platform was founded by Brian Rosenberg and his husband Ferd van Gameren. The gay couple became first-time dads in 2009 by creating their family through adoption and surrogacy.

== See also ==
- LGBT parenting
- LGBT community
- Surrogacy
- Adoption
