= 1st GLAAD Media Awards =

Award ceremony

- Date: April 29, 1990
- Location: Time & Life Building, New York City, New York, U.S.
- Hosted by: Phil Donahue

The 1st GLAAD Media Awards ceremony, presented by GLAAD and hosted by Phil Donahue, honor "fair, accurate and inclusive" representations of LGBT individuals in the media during the 1989 season, took place on April 29, 1990 at the Time & Life Building, New York City. Tickets to attend the ceremony cost $125.

== Ceremony information ==
GLAAD announced on April 4, 1990 that an award caremony "honoring positive achievements on gay and lesbian issues" would take place later that month on April 29, with nominees being announced on the same date. Almost two weeks later, it was announced that Phil Donahue, who was to be honored with the Media Personality of the Year, would act as host for the ceremony, to take place at the Time & Life Building. Tickets for the ceremony cost $125 per person. Besides Donahue acting as host, his wife Marlo Thomas was a presenter, while David Dinkins—Mayor of New York City—spoke at the ceremony.

== Winners and nominees ==
According to then-Director of Public Relations, Richard Ferraro, the 1st GLAAD Media Awards nominated 34 different projects across 7 categories. In this ceremony, all the entertainment programmes were nominated under a single category, and it would not be until the 2nd GLAAD Media Awards that separate categories would be created based on medium. Retrospective discussions of this ceremony by GLAAD have placed the entertainment award under specific categories created at latter ceremonies. For example, L.A. Law being treated as the inaugural Outstanding Drama Series winner, with the same applying to As the World Turns in the Outstanding Daily Drama category.

=== Entertainment ===
Phil Donahue won Media Person of the Year, the only individual nominated in this category, for "his continued excellence in coverage and support of gay and lesbian concerns". Donahue was joined on-stage by GLAAD co-founder Vito Russo.

As the World Turns and Doctor Doctor won for Outstanding Broadcast Entertainment.

ABC's 20/20, PBS' The AIDS Quarterly, CBS' West 57th, and HBO's Common Threads: Stories from the Quilt were nominated in the Outstanding Broadcast News or Editorial category. The AIDS Quarterly and Common Threads: Stories from the Quilt would win.

=== Print ===
Metropolitan Home, The Daily News, New York Woman, and The Village Voice were nominated for Most Improved New York Area Coverage of Gay and Lesbian Issues. The Daily News won the award, while Village Voice won for Best New York Area Coverage of Gay and Lesbian Issues.

Time magazine won for Most Improved National Coverage of Gay and Lesbian Issues, while Newsweek won Outstanding Print Feature for its 21st Century Family special edition. John J. O'Connor, writer for The New York Times, won for Outstanding Print Commentary (for Reporting by an Individual Writer). At a latter ceremony, Los Angeles Times won for Most Improved Local Coverage".

=== Special Recognition ===
During the ceremony, certain individuals and organizations were recognized:

- Bob Hope — for filming a public service announcement denouncing homophobia and anti-gay violence.
- Harvey Fierstein — for the film Torch Song Trilogy.
- United States Postal Service — for issuing a postmark commemorating the 20th anniversary of the Stonewall riots.
- Gay Cable Network — for the documentary Out in the 90's.

=== Defamatory Awards ===
This ceremony also included a Defamatory Entertainment category, with nominees including comedians Andrew Dice Clay, Sam Kinison, and Damon Wayans, alongside rock bands Guns N' Roses and Skid Row, and Howard Stern.

Bob Grant, Rush Limbaugh, and Andy Rooney were nominated for Defamatory Broadcast News or Editorial, while Pat Buchanan and William F. Buckley Jr. were nominated for Defamatory Print News or Editorial. Cosmopolitan magazine was nominated for Defamatory Print Feature.
