= Monica Roberts =

American writer and transgender rights advocate

- Born: May 4, 1962; Houston, Texas, US
- Died: October 5, 2020 (aged 58); Harris County, Texas, US
- Occupations: Blogger; writer; advocate
- Years active: 1999-2020
- Known for: TransGriot
- Website: transgriot.blogspot.com

Monica Katrice Roberts (May 4, 1962 – October 5, 2020) was an African-American blogger, writer, and transgender rights advocate. She was the founding editor of TransGriot, a blog focusing on issues pertaining to trans women, particularly African-American and other women of color. Roberts' coverage of transgender homicide victims in the United States is credited for bringing national attention to the issue.

== Early life and education ==
Roberts was born and raised in segregated Houston, Texas. Her mother was a schoolteacher and her father was a DJ. Roberts graduated from Jones High School in the Houston Independent School District in 1980. In 1984, she graduated from the University of Houston.

== Career and activism ==
Roberts was working in Houston as an airline gate agent in 1993–94 when she began her gender transition. She was a founding member of the National Transgender Advocacy Coalition, and served as its Lobby Chair from 1999 to 2002. In Louisville, Kentucky, Roberts served on the board of the Fairness Campaign and its political action committee C-FAIR. In 2005 and 2006, she organized the Transsistahs-Transbrothas Conference that took place in that city.

She began writing TransGriot in 2004 as a newspaper column for The Letter, a Louisville-based LGBT newspaper; the term "griot" refers to a storyteller from West Africa. Roberts founded the TransGriot blog in 2006. Roberts was motivated by a lack of trans blogs focused on black people and other people of color. One of the missions of her blog is to "chronicle the history of Black transpeople". The blog allowed her to address community issues in a more timely manner and allowed greater control than the column after it was taken away due to a conflict with an advertiser over her writing. Through TransGriot, Roberts also identified transgender homicide victims in order to tribute the victims, many of whom are often misgendered in police reporting and media coverage. Roberts' coverage of transgender homicides is credited for bringing national attention to the issue.

As a black trans woman, Roberts explored the intersections of cissexism and racism in her writing. In a 2009 column, she stated that people who have a problem with the word cisgender "are wailing in unacknowledged cisgender privilege", and compared this criticism to white people that "call me 'racist' anytime I criticize the underlying structural assumptions that buttress whiteness".

== Awards and recognition ==
In 2006, Roberts won the IFGE Trinity Award for meritorious service to the transgender community; it was the transgender community's highest meritorious service award, and she was the first African-American Texan and the third African-American openly trans person to be given the award. In 2015, Roberts received the Virginia Prince Transgender Pioneer Award from Fantasia Fair, making her the first African-American openly trans person to be so honored.

In 2016, Roberts received a Special Recognition Award from GLAAD, and became the first openly trans person to receive Phillips Brooks House Association's Robert Coles "Call of Service" Award. In 2017, Roberts received the HRC John Walzel Equality Award from the Human Rights Campaign.

In 2018, she was named one of "8 Houston Women to Watch on Social Media" by Houstonia. and won Outstanding Blog at the GLAAD Media Awards. In January 2020, Roberts received the Susan J Hyde Award for Longevity in the Movement from the National LGBTQ Task Force. In June 2020, in honor of the 50th anniversary of the first LGBTQ Pride parade, Queerty named her among the fifty heroes "leading the nation toward equality, acceptance, and dignity for all people".

In April 2021, TransGriot won a GLAAD Media Award in the Outstanding Blog category.

== Personal life, death and legacy ==
Memorial in Montrose, Houston

Roberts began her gender transition in 1993–94. She had felt since she was five or six that "something was different about me", but didn't have access to black trans role models at that time (the 1970s); she felt that she would have transitioned earlier if she had.

Roberts died on October 5, 2020. Her death was announced on October 8, 2020, in a Facebook post by her friend Dee Dee Watters, and was later confirmed by the Harris County Medical Examiner and local media. Roberts' death was initially reported as a hit and run case, though the medical examiner later stated that the cause of death was a "medical emergency"; her family reported that she was feeling unwell in the days prior to her death. The following week, the medical examiner reported the cause of death was complications of a pulmonary embolism.

Many LGBT activists, writers, and other celebrities paid tribute to Roberts via social media following the announcement of her death, including Janet Mock, Raquel Willis, Jen Richards, Darnell L. Moore, and Human Rights Campaign president Alphonso David.

In January 2021, Dee Dee Watters, another Houston activist and friend of Roberts, announced plans for a publication named TransGriot to continue the work Roberts had done to cover black and trans issues on her blog of the same name.

There is a memorial to Roberts, in the form of an electrical enclosure painted with her likeness, in Montrose. Abbie Kamin, a member of Houston City Council, established the project to make the memorial; Katherine Ligon and Brad Pritchett were the artists. The process of proposal to completing the memorial was about one year. Sam Byrd of OutSmart stated that the memorial shows a "silent gaze".

== See also ==
- History of African Americans in Houston
- LGBT culture in Houston
