= List of transgender people =

Transgender people are individuals who identify as a gender that differs from their sex as assigned at birth. In some non-Western, ancient or medieval societies, transgender people may be seen as a different gender entirely, and there may be a separate category for them that is different from the binary of 'man' or 'woman'. These people might be described collectively as occupying a third gender role. These cultures may have traditional social and ceremonial roles for third gender people, which are different from men's or women's roles and social spaces.

While cross-dressing is not synonymous with being transgender, some of the persons listed here crossdressed during wartime for various purposes. Some of those listed here are on the lists for non-binary people or non-binary writers but only those individuals who have been identified, through reliable sources, as non-binary and transgender, are included on this page.

== Actors and actresses ==
- Talleen Abu Hanna (born 1994)
- Calpernia Addams (born 1971)
- Ian Alexander (born 2001)
- Adèle Anderson (born 1952), Fascinating Aïda member
- Erica Andrews (Erica Salazar) (1969–2013)
- Buck Angel (born 1962)
- Carla Antonelli (born 1960)
- Alexis Arquette (1969–2016)
- Saga Becker (born 1988)
- Alexandra Billings (born 1962)
- Mya Bollaers (born 1996)
- Alejandra Bogue (born 1965)
- Chaz Bono (born 1969)
- Shauna Brooks (born 1990)
- Carmen Carrera (born 1985)
- Parinya Charoenphol (born 1981)
- Nic Chien (born 2006)
- Jamie Clayton
- Michael D. Cohen (born 1975)
- Caroline Cossey (a.k.a. Tula) (born 1954)
- Laverne Cox (born 1972)
- Brittany CoxXx (1978–2016)
- Candy Darling (1944–1974)
- Tista Das (born 1976)
- Morgan Davies (born 2001)
- Florencia de la V (born 1976)
- Emma Dumont (born 1994)
- Cyrus Grace Dunham (born 1992)
- Kizzy Edgell (born 2002)
- Rüzgar Erkoçlar (born 1986)
- Bülent Ersoy (born 1952)
- Yasmin Finney (born 2003/2004)
- Garcia
- Gloria Gray (born 1965)
- Choi Han-bit (born 1987)
- Rose Harlean (born 1992)
- Ian Harvie (born 1968)
- Michelle Hendley (born 1991)
- Stacey Hollywood (born 1968)
- Eddie Izzard (born 1962)
- Dominique Jackson (born 1975)
- Bailey Jay (born 1988)
- Christine Jorgensen (1926–1989), first public trans person in US to get gender reassignment surgery
- Sir Lady Java (born 1943)
- Vladimir Luxuria (born 1965)
- L Morgan Lee, first openly transgender actor to be nominated for a Tony Award
- Gerard McCarthy (born 1981)
- Miles McKenna (born 1995)
- Nicole Maines (born 1997), played the first television transgender superhero on CW's Supergirl)
- Lío Mehiel
- Bobbi Salvör Menuez (born 1993)
- Ezra Miller (born 1992)
- Riley Carter Millington (born 1993/1994)
- Thammy Miranda (born 1982)
- Indya Moore (born 1995)
- Satsuki Nakayama (born 1998)
- Hari Nef (born 1992)
- Richard O'Brien (born 1942)
- Mina Orfanou (born 1982)
- Elliot Page (born 1987)
- Nany People (born 1965)
- Yasmine Petty
- Georgea Regout (born 1969)
- Eva Robin's (born 1958)
- Mj Rodriguez (born 1991)
- Rebecca Root (born 1969)
- Nyla Rose (born 1982)
- Angelica Ross (born 1980)
- Ali Saleem (born 1979)
- Harmony Santana
- Hunter Schafer (born 1999)
- Cariza "Ice" Yamson Seguerra (born 1983)
- Leo Sheng (born 1996)
- Lee Si-yeon (born 1979)
- Brian Michael Smith (born 1983)
- Jahna Steele (1958–2008)
- Stav Strashko (born 1992)
- Zoe Terakes
- Josie Totah (born 2001)
- Gabrielle Tremblay (born 1990)
- Daniela Vega (born 1989)
- Annie Wallace (born 1965), first transgender person to portray a regular character in British soap opera history
- Lachlan Watson (born 2001)
- Holly Woodlawn

== Academics ==
- Ryka Aoki
- Leilane Assunção (1981–2018)
- Kate Bornstein
- Gabrielle Calvocoressi (born 1974)
- Micha Cárdenas (born 1977)
- Raewyn Connell (born 1944)
- Syrus Marcus Ware (born 1977), created first sexual health guide for trans men
- Aisha Mughal, transgender rights expert, Ministry of Human Rights
- Sandy Stone (born c. 1936)
- Susan Stryker (born 1961)

== Activists ==
- Tita Aida
- Gloria Allen (1945–2022)
- Taylor Alxndr (born 1993)
- Nikki Araguz Loyd (1975–2019)
- Nisha Ayub (born 1979), first trans woman to be awarded with the prestigious International Women of Courage Award in 2016
- Grace Banu (born 1988), first transgender engineer in Tamil Nadu
- Bobbie Lea Bennett (1947 – 2019)
- Munroe Bergdorf (born 1987)
- Leyna Bloom (born 1990)
- Chastity Bowick (born 1985)
- Jennifer Finney Boylan (born 1958)
- Blake Brockington (1996–2015)
- Rebekah Bruesehoff (born 2007)
- Elie Che (1998–2020)
- Mauro Cabral Grinspan (born 1971)
- Eli Clare (born 1963)
- Angela Clayton (1959–2014)
- Lynn Conway(1938–2024)
- Luiza Coppieters (born 1979)
- Ruby Corado (born 1970)
- Victoria Cruz (born 1945/1946)
- Imanni Da Silva (born 1981)
- Ashley Diamond (born 1978)
- Sean Dorsey (born 1972/73)
- Angela Lynn Douglas (1943–2007)
- Mason J. Dunn (born 1985)
- Felicia Elizondo (1946–2021)
- Eli Erlick (born 1995)
- Trinidad Falcés (1942–2022)
- Leslie Feinberg (1949–2014)
- Owl Fisher (born 1991)
- Lydia Foy (born 1947)
- Tyler Ford (born 1990)
- Paulete Furacão
- Nats Getty (born 1992)
- Alexander John Goodrum (1960–2002)
- Julia Grant (1954–2019), first person to have their gender reassignment followed on UK television in A Change of Sex
- Jamison Green (born 1948)
- Miss Major Griffin-Gracy (1940–2025)
- Greyson Gritt
- Deborah Hartin (1933–2005)
- Elle Hearns (born 1986/7), co-founder of the Black Lives Matter Global Network, founder of the Marsha P. Johnson Institute
- Katie Rain Hill (born c. 1994)
- Lady Paula Howard (1912–2000)
- Andrea James (born 1967)
- Natasha Jiménez
- Christina Kahrl, co-founder of Baseball Prospectus
- Roz Kaveney (born 1949)
- Sakris Kupila (born 1996)
- Rodrigo Lehtinen (born 1986)
- Mara La Torre (born 1991)
- Lily McBeth (1934–2014)
- CeCe McDonald (born 1989)
- Tiq Milan
- Janet Mock (born 1983), former staff editor of People magazine's website
- Chris Mosier (born 1980)
- Tania Navarro Amo (born 1956)
- Ariel Nicholson (born 2001)
- Paris Lees (born 1986)
- sj Miller (born 1970)
- Rusty Mae Moore (1941-2022)
- Anne Ogborn (born 1959)
- Pepe Julian Onziema (born 1981)
- Brooklyn Owen (born 2000)
- Pauline Park (born 1960)
- Midge Potts (born 1969)
- Virginia Prince (born 1912–2009)
- Rupert Raj (born 1952)
- Silvia Reyes (1949–2024), participant in Spain's first pride march (1977)
- Sylvia Rivera (1951–2002)
- Monica Roberts (1962–2020)
- Geena Rocero (born 1983/84)
- Diane Marie Rodriguez Zambrano (born 1982)
- Trish Salah
- Bamby Salcedo
- Ryan Sallans (born 1979)
- Mia Satya (born 1990)
- Gopi Shankar Madurai (born 1991), founder of Srishti Madurai Student Volunteer Collective
- Keila Simpson (born 1966)
- Indianarae Siqueira, creator of the term "transvestigênere" (lit. 'Transvestigender').
- Gwendolyn Ann Smith (born 1967), founder of Transgender Day of Remembrance
- Abby Stein (born 1991)
- Georgie Stone (born 2000)
- Kalki Subramaniam, former member of the National Council for Transgender Persons in India
- Lou Sullivan (1951–1991)
- Feroza Syed
- Titica (born 1987)
- Henry Tse (born 1990/91)
- Justine Tunney (born 1984), former Occupy movement activist
- Brianna Westbrook (born 1984)
- Penny Whetton (1958–2019)
- Stephen Whittle (born 1955)
- Raquel Willis (born 1990/91), Transgender Law Center national organizer
- Erica Woodland

== Entertainers, performers, and media personalities ==
- Aja (born 1994)
- Jessica Alves (born 1983)
- Malévola Alves (born 2004)
- Qween Amor
- Victor Barker (1895–1960)
- River Butcher (born 1982)
- Candis Cayne (born 1971)
- Coccinelle (1931–2006)
- Julián Delgado Lopera (born 1988)
- Endigo (born 1992)
- Gottmik (born 1996)
- Harisu (born 1975), second person in Korea to legally change their gender in 2002
- Gia Gunn (born 1990)
- Lauren Harries (born 1978)
- Caitlyn Jenner (born 1949)
- Justine Lindsay (born 1992), first openly transgender NFL Cheerleader
- Kellie Maloney (born 1953)
- Chanty Marostica
- Maya Massafera (born 1980)
- Cris Miró (1965–1999), first travesti in Argentina to be massively accepted by the public
- Leroy Mokgatle (born 1999)
- Nizah Morris (1955–2002)
- Bell Nuntita (born 1983), participant on the show Thailand's Got Talent
- Peppermint (born 1980)
- Miriam Rivera (1981–2019)
- Carmen Rupe (1936–2011)
- Amy Schneider (born 1979), winner of 40 consecutive games on the quiz show Jeopardy!
- Ramon Te Wake (born 1976)
- Vanessa Van Cartier (born 1979)
- Adela Vázquez (1958-2024)
- Rose Venkatesan (born 1980)
- Demoria Elise Williams (born 1992)
- Jin Xing (born 1967)
- Marie-Pier Ysser (born 1935)

== Artists ==
- Mark Aguhar (1987–2012), multimedia fine artist
- Justine Mara Andersen
- Sadie Benning, artist, who has worked primarily in video, painting, drawing, sculpture, photography and sound
- Ria Brodell, visual artist
- Loren Cameron (1959-2022), portrait artist
- La Chola Poblete (born 1989), visual artist
- Lili Elbe (1882–1931), painter
- Jeffrey Catherine Jones (1944–2011), painter
- Julia Kaye (born 1988), illustrator
- Lee Lai (born 1993), illustrator
- Greer Lankton (1958–1996), doll-making artist
- Zanele Muholi (born 1972), visual artist and photographer
- Remy Noe (born 1974), landscape artist
- Coyote Park (born 1999), portrait painter
- ND Stevenson (born 1991), illustrator, cartoonist, and animation producer

== Businesspeople ==
- Kate Craig-Wood (1977-2020), IT entrepreneur and co-founder of Memset Dedicated Hosting
- Sophia Hutchins (1996–2025)
- Jakkaphong Jakrajutatip (born 1979), third richest transgender person in the world
- Patricia Morgan (1939–1986?)
- Jennifer Pritzker (born 1950), investor, philanthropist
- Margaret Stumpp (born 1952), executive

== Doctors and physicians ==
- Rebecca Allison (born 1946), president-elect of Gay and Lesbian Medical Association
- Esben Esther Pirelli Benestad (born 1949)
- Michael Dillon (1915–1962)
- Sir Ewan Forbes (1912–1991), 11th Baronet of Craigievar
- Beoncy Laishram, first openly transgender doctor from Northeast India
- Rachel Levine (born 1957), United States Assistant Secretary for Health (2021-2025)
- Renée Richards (born 1934)

== Fashion designers ==
- Kataluna Enriquez (born 1995), first trans woman to become a Miss USA contestant and win Miss Nevada USA
- Nik Kacy (born 1975)
- Isis King (born 1985)

== Filmmakers ==
- Ashley Altadonna (born 1979)
- Cait Brennan (born 1969)
- Laerte Coutinho (born 1951)
- Fox Fisher (born 1980)
- Ro Haber
- Chely Lima (1957–2023)
- Lana Wachowski (born 1965), co-director of the Matrix films
- Lily Wachowski (born 1967)

== Journalists ==
- Sarah Ashton-Cirillo (born 1977), first transgender war correspondent, later spokesperson for Ukraine's Territorial Defense Forces
- Gianna Camacho
- Jack Bee Garland (1869–1936)
- Debbie Hayton (born 1968)
- Stephanie Hirst (born 1975)
- Freddy McConnell (born 1986)
- James Stephanie Sterling (born 1984)
- Zoey Tur (born 1960)
- Philippa York (born 1958)

== Lawyers ==
- Taylor Brown, lawyer and first openly transgender person to lead a New York City office or agency
- Sonia Burgess (1947-2010), leading British immigration lawyer who initiated cases such as M v. Home Office (1993) and Chahal v. United Kingdom (1996)
- Alejandra Caraballo (1990/1991)
- Irene Clyde (1869–1954), lawyer and later editor of the journal Urania
- Mariana Casas (born 1959), first transgender lawyer in Argentina
- Robyn Gigl (born 1952)
- Park Han-hee, first openly transgender lawyer from South Korea
- Victoria Kolakowski (born 1961), lawyer and later first openly transgender person to serve as a trial court judge of general jurisdiction in the United States
- Ellen Krug (born 1956), first attorney in Iowa to engage in jury trials in separate genders.
- Robeyoncé Lima, first trans woman to practice law in Pernambuco.
- Victoria McCloud,
- Nisha Rao, first transgender law graduate in Pakistan
- Martine Rothblatt (born 1954)
- Dean Spade (born 1977), founded a number of activist projects such as the Sylvia Rivera Law Project
- Chase Strangio (born 1982), first known transgender person to make oral arguments before the Supreme Court of the United States
- Michelle Suárez Bértora (1983-2022), was Uruguay's first openly transgender university graduate, first openly trans lawyer, and first openly transgender person elected to office

== Models ==
- April Ashley (1935–2021)
- Laith Ashley (born 1989)
- Viviany Beleboni (born 1989)
- Aleshia Brevard (1937-2017)
- Chen Lili (born 1980)
- Roberta Close (born 1964)
- Gemma Cowling
- Emma Ellingsen (born 2001)
- Erika Ervin (born 1979)
- Connie Fleming, pioneer of transgender models
- Loiza Lamers (born 1995), first transgender winner in the Top Model franchise
- Yasmin Lee
- Amanda Lepore
- Alicia Liu (born 1986)
- Maxim Magnus
- Shay Neary (born 1987/88), first transgender plus-size model to be featured in a major fashion campaign
- Tracey Norman (born 1951), first African-American transgender woman model to appear on a box of Clairol hair-coloring in the 1970s
- Andreja Pejić (born 1991)
- Ángela Ponce (born 1991), beauty pageant titleholder who won Miss Spain 2018
- Sam Porto (born 1995)
- Teddy Quinlivan (born 1994)
- Valentina Sampaio (born 1996)
- Kylie Sonique Love (born 1983)
- Lea T (born 1981)
- Jenna Talackova (born 1988)
- Cindy Thái Tài (born 1981)

== Musicians ==
=== Electronic ===
- Irmãs de Pau, Brazilian duo composed of Isma Almeida e Vita Pereira
- Arca (born 1989)
- Estelle Asmodelle (1964-2026)
- Black Dresses, Canadian duo composed of Devi McCallion and Ada Rook
- Wendy Carlos (born 1939)
- Laura Les (born 1994 or 1995), member of 100 Gecs
- Liza 'N' Eliaz (1958–2001)
- Jordana LeSesne
- Sophie Xeon (1986–2021)
- Underscores (born 2000)

=== Folk ===
- Namoli Brennet (born 1970)
- Mya Byrne (born 1978)
- Ryan Cassata (born 1993)
- Jen Cloher (born 1973)
- Clover-Lynn
- Maxine Feldman (1945–2007)
- Dorce Gamalama (1963-2022)
- Beverly Glenn-Copeland (born 1944)

=== Jazz ===
- Terre Thaemlitz (born 1968)
- Billy Tipton (1914–1989)

=== Pop ===
- Aderet (born 1976)
- Anohni (born 1971), Anohni and the Johnsons lead singer
- Dorian Electra (born 1992)
- Elio Mei (born 2002)
- Dana International (born 1969)
- Trevi Moran (born 1998)
- Ataru Nakamura (born 1985)
- Kim Petras (born 1992)
- Elliott Platt (born 2004)
- Nat Puff (born 1996)
- Rinu (born 1998)
- Noah Skaalum (born 1995)
- Jake Zyrus (born 1992)

=== Punk ===
- Jayne County (born 1947), founder of proto-punk group Queen Elizabeth
- Laura Jane Grace (born 1980), lead singer and guitarist for Against Me!
- Bambi Lake (1950–2020)
- Rae Spoon (born 1982)

=== Rap and hip-hop ===
- Backxwash (born 1991)
- Cocona, member of Japanese vocal group, XG
- Rocco Kayiatos (born 1979), first openly transgender singer in the hip-hop genre

=== Rock ===
- Noah Finn Adams (a.k.a. Noahfinnce) (born 1999), singer-songwriter and YouTuber
- Sam Bettens (born 1972), lead singer of K's Choice
- Justin Vivian Bond (born 1963)
- Cidny Bullens (born 1955)
- Ethel Cain (born 1998)
- Quinn Christopherson (born 1992)
- Teddy Geiger (born 1988)
- Emily Green (born 2002), guitarist of Geese
- Dee Palmer (1937-2026), musician from Jethro Tull
- Jordan Raskopoulos (born 1982), singer in The Axis of Awesome
- Lucas Silveira
- Ezra (Liz) Furman (born 1986), musician and songwriter from Chicago

=== Other ===
- Alexander James Adams (born 1962)
- Barbra Amesbury (born 1948)
- Amethyst (born 1995)
- Fran Blanche
- Willmer Broadnax (1916-1992)
- Sara Davis Buechner
- Baby Dee (born 1953)
- Majur dos Santos Conceição (a.k.a Majur) (born 1995)
- Florian-Ayala Fauna
- Michelle Josef (born 1954)
- Ed Le Brocq (formerly Eddie Ayres) (born 1967)
- Marissa Martinez (born 1975)
- Angela Morley (1924–2009)
- Evelyn Morris
- Priscila Nogueira (a.k.a. Mulher Pepita or just Pepita) (born 1983)
- Deena Kaye Rose
- Daniel Sea (born 1973)
- Jackie Shane (1940-2019)
- Jeanette Schmid (1924–2005)
- Janine Wegman (1925-2007), one of the first Dutch people to be openly transgender
- Yukichi (born 1984), Yoshimoto Kogyo's first transgender male entertainer

=== Musical groups ===
- Lady, transgender pop group active during 2005-2007

== Politicians ==
- Tamara Adrián
- Jenny Bailey (born 1962), former mayor of Cambridge
- Sibylle Berg (born 1962)
- Georgina Beyer (1957-2023), world's first openly transgender mayor and world's first openly transgender member of parliament
- Sarah Brown (born 1972/74)
- Billie Butler, first transgender state legislator in New Hampshire
- Aimee Challenor (born 1997)
- Joanne Conte (1933-2013), first openly transgender person to be elected to a city council in the U.S.
- Phillipe Cunningham (born 1987)
- Jowelle de Souza (born 1974)
- Petra De Sutter (born 1963), former deputy prime minister of Belgium
- Philippine Dhanis (1967–2022)
- Tessa Ganserer (born 1977)
- Althea Garrison (born 1940)
- Maebe A. Girl (born 1986)
- Anna Grodzka (born 1954), first transgender MP in European history
- Murray Hall (1841-1911)
- Jamie Lee Hamilton (1955-2019), the first transgender person to run for political office in Canada
- Jess Herbst (born 1958)
- Adela Hernández (born 1962), first transgender person elected to political office in Cuba
- Kim Coco Iwamoto (born 1968), first transgender state legislator in Hawaii history.
- Andrea Jenkins (born 1961)
- Aya Kamikawa (born 1968)
- Sarah McBride, first openly trans member of US Congress
- Lily Madigan (born 1998), first openly transgender woman to become a Women's Officer within the Labour Party
- Dina Nina Martinez-Rutherford (born 1970)
- Shabnam Mausi
- Micheline Montreuil (born 1952)
- Anwen Muston, first openly transgender woman to be elected to represent Labour Party
- Dylan Orr (born 1979), first transgender person appointed to a presidential administration
- Stu Rasmussen (1948–2021), first openly transgender mayor in the United States
- Danica Roem (born 1984)
- Geraldine Roman (born 1967)
- Fulvia Celica Siguas Sandoval, Guinness Book of World Records record holder for the most gender reassignment surgeries
- Lauren Scott (born 1963)
- Matilda Simon (born 1955), hereditary peer and 3rd Baron Simon of Wythenshawe
- Amanda Simpson (born 1961)
- Nikki Sinclaire (born 1968)
- Nyke Slawik (born 1994)
- Theresa Sparks (born 1949)
- Susan Stanton (born 1959)
- Michelle Suárez Bértora (1983–2022), Substitute Senator (2014–2017) in Uruguay
- Audrey Tang (born 1981), Digital Minister
- Brianna Titone (born 1978)
- Manuela Trasobares (born 1962)

== Social media influencers ==
- Briel Adams-Wheatley
- Traniela Campolieto, first transgender woman to be an airline captain in the history of Argentina and of Latin America
- Selin Ciğerci, social media influencer and businesswoman
- AJ Clementine (born 1996)
- Robin Daniel Skinner (a.k.a. Cavetown) (born 1998)
- Leandra Duarte (a.k.a. Leandrinha Du Art) (born 1995)
- Nikkie de Jager (born 1994)
- Emira D'Spain (born 1996)
- Eden Estrada (a.k.a. Eden The Doll) (born 1995)
- Gigi Gorgeous (born 1992)
- Lewis Hancox (born 1989)
- Mathilda Högberg (born 1994)
- Grace Hyland
- Jazz Jennings (born 2000)
- Jools Lebron
- Isabella Longuinho (a.k.a. Bella Longuinho) (born 2002)
- Charlotte McDonnell (born 1990)
- Dylan Mulvaney (born 1996)
- Bryanna Nasck
- Ophelia Pastrana
- Jamie Raines (Jammidodger) (born 1994)
- Stef Sanjati (born 1995)
- Cortisa Star (born 2005)
- Abigail Thorn (born 1993)
- Vivian Wilson (born 2004)
- Natalie Wynn (a.k.a. ContraPoints) (born 1988)
- Paulo Vaz (1985–2022)

== Scientists ==
- Ben Barres (1954–2017), neurobiologist
- Riley Black, paleontologist
- Dania Gutiérrez, bioengineer, researcher
- Mary Ann Horton (born 1955), computer scientist, successfully requested the first transgender-inclusive language added to the Equal Employment Policy in a large American company
- Joan Roughgarden (born 1946), biologist
- Eliana Rubashkyn (born 1988), pharmacist, first transgender woman recognised as woman under International Law and the UNHCR
- Julia Serano, evolutionary biologist
- Robyn Leigh Tanguay (born 1966), environmental and molecular toxicologist
- Sophie Wilson (born 1957), computer scientist

== Military and intelligence personnel ==
- Aleksandr Aleksandrov (1783-1860), Russian cavalry soldier
- Carlett Brown Angianlee (born c. 1927), U.S. Navy veteran
- Robina Asti (1921–2021), US Navy pilot during World War II, record holder for world's oldest flight instructor
- Abigail Austen (born 1965), Soldier
- James Barry (1789/99–1865), Inspector General overseeing military hospitals
- Sabrina Bruce, U.S. Air Force and U.S. Space Force non-commissioned officer
- Lynda Cash (born 1949/1950), British Royal Navy officer
- Albert Cashier (1843–1915), Union Army soldier
- Sister Mary Elizabeth Clark (born 1938), US Navy and Army soldier, nun
- Roberta Cowell (1918–2011), World War II fighter pilot, the first British trans woman to undergo gender reassignment
- Kara Corcoran, U.S. Army major
- Julia Curlee, American intelligence officer with the CIA and United States National Security Council
- Sage Fox, first openly transgender military service member invited to serve openly
- Bree Fram, Colonel in the United States Space Force, engineer
- Olivia Frank (1956–2023), military officer and intelligence agent
- Hannah Graf, Highest-ranked transgender person in the British Army
- Jamie Lee Henry, first openly transgender military officer in the United States
- Laila Ireland, U.S. Army corporal
- Logan Ireland, U.S. Air Force master sergeant
- Erin Krizek, U.S. Air Force lieutenant colonel
- Chelsea Manning (born 1987), soldier and whistleblower
- Cate McGregor (born 1956), senior military officer
- Caroline Paige (born 1961), Royal Air Force officer
- Jennifer Peace, U.S. Army captain
- Allyson Robinson, served as U.S. Army officer
- Amelio Robles Ávila (born 1889) served as Colonel
- Shawn Skelly (born 1966), U.S. naval commander and Assistant Secretary of Defense for Readiness
- Erica Vandal, U.S. Army major
- Joanne Wingate (born 1960), Soldier

== Sportspeople ==
=== Athletics ===
- Balian Buschbaum (born 1980), pole vaulter
- Lauren Jeska, fell-runner
- Andreas Krieger (born 1966), shot putter

=== Basketball ===
- Kye Allums (born 1989)
- Layshia Clarendon (born 1991)
- Che Flores (born 1979), first openly trans official in a Big Four sports league

=== Cycling ===
- Willy De Bruyn (1914–1989)
- Michelle Dumaresq (born 1970)
- Veronica Ivy (formerly Rachel McKinnon) (born 1982)
- Natalie van Gogh (born 1974)
- Femke Verstichelen (born 1984)

=== Other ===
- Mianne Bagger (born 1966), first openly transitioned woman to play in a professional golf tournament
- Harrison Browne (born 1993), hockey player for the Buffalo Beauts
- Ricardo del Real, taekwondo practitioner
- Fallon Fox (born 1975), mixed martial artist
- Laurel Hubbard (born 1978), weightlifter
- Janae Kroc (born 1972), professional powerlifter and competitive bodybuilder
- Patricio Manuel (born 1985), first transgender professional boxer in the United States
- Shuna Matsumoto, Japanese association football coach
- Terri O'Connell (born 1964), automobile racer
- Thomas Page McBee (born 1981), first transgender man to box in Madison Square Garden
- Gabbi Tuft (born 1978), professional wrestler
- Anne Viriato (born 1997), mixed martial arts fighter
- Loui Sand (born 1992), professional handball player

== Theologians, clergymen, and priests ==
- Marja-Sisko Aalto, Lutheran priest
- Donnie Anderson (born 1947 or 1948), Baptist minister
- Christina Beardsley (born 1951), Anglican priest
- Mario Martino, nurse, nun, and early trans male autobiographer
- Public Universal Friend (1752–1819), self-professed evangelist/preacher, shunned any gendered pronouns, often referred to as P.U.F. or "the Friend"
- Megan Rohrer, (former) Lutheran bishop

== Victims of anti-trans violence ==
- Gwen Araujo (1985–2002)
- Victoria Arellano (1984–2007)
- Doski Azad (c. 1999–2022)
- Tehuel de la Torre (born 1999)
- Dandara dos Santos (1975-2017)
- Rita Hester (1963–1998), inspiration for the first Transgender Day of Remembrance
- Jennifer Laude (1987-2014)
- Brandon Teena (1972-1993), subject of the films The Brandon Teena Story and Boys Don't Cry.
- Pamela Walton (1963–1988)

== Video game developers and designers ==
- Anna Anthropy, video game designer
- Danielle Bunten Berry (1949–1998), video game designer
- Crystal Frasier, game designer and author of the webcomic Venus Envy
- Rebecca Heineman (1936-2025), video game designer
- Jennell Jaquays (1956-2024), video game designer
- Lena Raine (born 1984), video game developer
- Maddy Thorson (born 1988), video game developer
- Narcissa Wright (born 1989), video game speedrunner
- Brianna Wu (born 1977), video game developer

== Writers ==
- Jennie Alexander (1930–2018)
- Charlie Jane Anders (born 1969)
- Jacob Anderson-Minshall (born 1967)
- Nina Arsenault (born 1974)
- Karl M. Baer (1885–1956)
- Mira Bellwether (1982–2022)
- S. Bear Bergman
- Jackson Bird (born 1990)
- Z Brewer (born 1973)
- William J. Martin (born 1967)
- KB Brookins (born 1995)
- Alec Butler (born 1959)
- Meryn Cadell
- Kacen Callender (born 1989)
- Patrick Califia (born 1954)
- T Cooper
- Christine Daniels (1957–2009)
- Juno Dawson (born 1981)
- Harry Dodge (born 1966)
- Caragh Donley
- Walter Sholto Douglas (1790–1830)
- Gabe Dunn (born 1988)
- Alison Evans
- Ina Fried (born 1974), senior writer for CNET Networks
- Alan L. Hart (1890-1962)
- Candice Iloh
- Jennie June (born 1870s)
- Aidan Key (born 1964), author of Trans Bodies, Trans Selves
- Trevor Kirczenow (born 1985)
- Sophie Labelle (born 1987/88)
- Joy Ladin (born 1961), first openly transgender professor at an Orthodox Jewish institution
- Daniel M. Lavery (born 1986)
- Samantha Leigh Allen
- Sassafras Lowrey (born 1983/1984)
- Finn Mackay (born 1977/1978)
- Jan Morris (1926–2020)
- Esdras Parra (1937–2004)
- Everest Pipkin
- Rachel Pollack (1945-2023)
- Ljuba Prenner (1906–1977), author of the first Slovene crime novel
- Ariel Florencia Richards
- Martine Rothblatt (born 1954)
- Marianna Salzmann (born 1985)
- Lucy Sante (born 1954)
- Scott Turner Schofield (born 1981)
- Vivek Shraya (born 1981)
- Dawn Langley Simmons
- René Stoute (1950–2000)
- Aiden Thomas (born 1989)
- Jeanne Thornton (born 1989), copublisher of Instar Books and Rocksalt Magazine
- John Thorp (1927-2017)
- Jennifer Ventimilia
- Andrew Joseph White
- Jia Qing Wilson-Yang (born 1986)
- Kit Yan

== Other notables ==
- Agnes (born 1939), case study subject
- Erica Anderson, clinical psychologist
- Harry Allen (1882–1922), pioneer during Pacific Northwest period known for flouting social norms
- Maddie Blaustein (1960-2009), voice over artist
- Isla Bryson (born 1991), Scottish rapist who was moved to a male prison despite being a trans woman
- Hannah Cairo (born 2007), mathematician, disproved the longstanding Mizohata–Takeuchi conjecture in harmonic analysis at age 17
- maia arson crimew (born 1999), trans hacker, known for leaking source code and other data from companies such as Intel and Nissan
- Jaime Deer, American police officer
- Chevalière d'Éon (1728–1810), French aristocrat, spy, and diplomat
- Antonio de Erauso (born 1585/92), explorer
- Vicky de Lambray (1950–1986), sex worker and con artist
- Elagabalus (203–222), Roman emperor characterized as transgender
- Phyllis Frye (born 1946), first openly transgender judge in Texas
- Ketty Gabriele (born 1982), reputed Italian mafia figure and femminiello
- Alex Hai (born 1967), gondoliere
- Lucy Hicks Anderson (1886–1954), one of the earliest documented trans women
- Tyra Hunter (1970–1995), hairdresser
- Cam Lyman (born 1932–c. 1987), dog breeder
- Amber McLaughlin (1973–2023), first transgender person to be executed in the US
- Joyita Mondal, first openly transgender female judge in India (2017)
- Ela Nikbayan (died 2021), Iranian woman who committed suicide by self-immolation in Germany
- Waldirene Nogueira (1945–2026), first woman to undergo gender-affirming surgery in Brazil
- Charley Parkhurst (1812–1879), stagecoach driver
- Fay Presto (born 1948), magician
- Dora Richter (1892–1966), first known person to undergo complete male-to-female gender-affirming surgery
- John/Eleanor Rykener (1394–?), 14th century sex worker
- Tiffany Scott (1991/92–2024) Scottish sex offender who applied successfully to be transferred from a men's to a women's prison
- Efrat Tilma (born 1947), police officer
- Karen Ulane (1941–1989), pilot fired by Eastern Airlines; discrimination case set Title VII precedent for transgender people
- Karen White (born 1965/66), English rapist; her case led to a change in government policy on housing transgender prisoners
- Barbara Ann Wilcox (1912-1962), known for her successful 1941 petition to change her legal name to her chosen name

== See also ==
- List of non-binary people
- List of intersex people
- List of gay, lesbian or bisexual people
- List of LGBTQ sportspeople
- List of fictional transgender characters
- List of transgender publications
- List of transgender-rights organizations
- Outline of transgender topics
