= Fiona Dawson =

LGBTQ rights activist

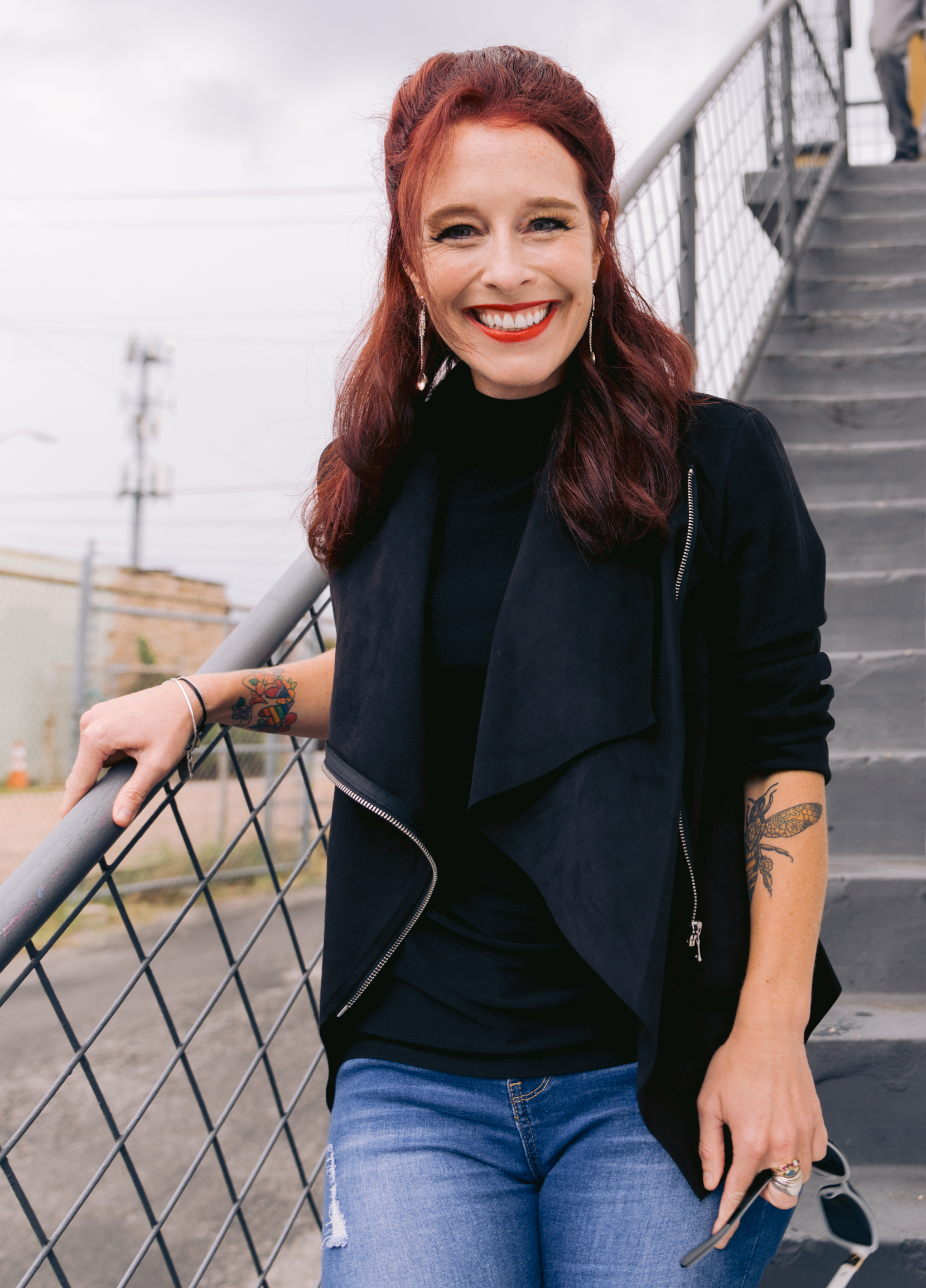
- Dawson in 2020
- Born: Fiona Jane Dawson; 31 July 1977 (age 49); Suffolk, England
- Citizenship: British; United States
- Education: University of Essex
- Occupations: Film director, producer, writer
- Years active: 2010-present
- Known for: TransMilitary
- Website: http://www.fionadawson.com

Fiona Jane Dawson (born 31 July 1977) is a writer, producer, and film director. She is best known for the documentary TransMilitary (2018), which premiered at the SXSW Film Festival and won the Audience Award. Dawson is an Emmy-nominated documentarian and has lived in America since 2000.

== Early life and education ==
Dawson grew up in the village of Swineshead, Lincolnshire, England with a younger sister and brother. Her parents both worked for the NHS. Dawson graduated with a Bachelor of Science (BSc) in Psychology from the University of Essex.

== Career ==
In 2015, Dawson was commissioned by The New York Times to direct and produce the short opinion documentary, Transgender at War and in Love. The film was released on 4 June 2015, on The Times' Op-Doc platform and was positioned that day on the publication's website home page. The film's success earned Dawson the honour of being an LGBT Artist Champion of Change awarded by the Obama administration. The film won the White House News Photographers Association's Best Documentary, was nominated for a GLAAD Award in the Outstanding Digital Journalism – Multimedia category, and was a nominee for Outstanding Short Documentary in the 37th Annual News & Documentary Emmy. The film's characters, Senior Airman Logan Ireland and Corporal Laila Villanueva, were interviewed on The Ellen Show and participated in a private reception in the White House with President Obama, making Senior Airman Ireland the first openly transgender service member to walk the halls of the White House in uniform. Dawson continued working with director Gabriel Silverman and created the full-length feature documentary TransMilitary which follows Senior Airman Logan Ireland, Corporal Laila Villanueva, Captain Jennifer Peace and First Lieutenant El Cook. The film premiered at SXSW Film Festival in 2018 and won the Best Feature Documentary Audience Award. Dawson has served on the national board of directors of the Human Rights Campaign and the board of directors for NLGJA: The Association of LGBTQ+ Journalists.

== Personal life ==
Dawson became a US citizen in 2008. Dawson lives in Austin, Texas. She is openly bisexual and advocates for the LGBTQ+ community.

== Awards ==
- 2009 Houston's Female Grand Marshal for the 2009 LGBT Pride Parade.
- 2015 Identified as an LGBT Artist Champion of Change by the White House.
- 2016 Emmy Award Nominee for Transgender, at War and in Love.
- 2016 GLAAD Award Outstanding Digital Journalism – Multimedia category.
- 2018 SXSW Best Feature Documentary Audience Award for TransMilitary.
- 2018 Florida Film Festival Grand Jury Award for Best Documentary Feature for TransMilitary.
- 2018 Napa Valley Film Festival Special Jury Award for Best Untold Story and Audience Award for Favorite Documentary Feature for TransMilitary.
- 2018 Veterans Film Festival (Australia) Red Poppy Award for Best Film for TransMilitary.
