= Wegman =

Wegman is a surname. Notable people with the surname include:

- Bill Wegman (born 1962), Major League Baseball player
- Dorothy Wegman Raphaelson (1904–2005), American dancer, Ziegfeld Girl and vaudeville performer, and novelist
- Edward Wegman, American professor of statistics
- Janine Wegman (1925–2007), Dutch musician and artist
- Marie Wegman (1925–2004), All-American Girls Professional Baseball League player
- Robert Wegman (1918–2006), American merchant
- William Wegman (photographer) (born 1943), American artist

== See also ==
- Wegman report
- Wegmans
- Wegmans LPGA
- Collège Louise Wegman is a non-denominational school serving students in Kindergarten

== See also ==
- Wegmann
