= Dhanis =

Dhanis is a surname. Notable people with the surname include:

- Francis Dhanis (1861–1909), Belgian colonial civil servant and soldier active in Congo
- Philippine Dhanis (1967–2022), Belgian politician
