= Chen Lili =

Chen Lili may refer to:

- Chen Lili (model) (Chinese: 陈莉莉)
- Chen Lili (singer) (Chinese: 陈笠笠)
