= Esdras (given name) =

Esdras is a given name. Notable people with the name include:

- Esdras Alfred de St-Georges (1849–1890), Quebec lawyer, physician and political figure
- Esdras Minville (1896–1975), Quebec writer, economist and sociologist
- Esdras Padilla (born 1989), Honduran football player
- Esdras Parra (1929-2004), Venezuelan Writer, Poet and Trans women.
- Esdras Rangel (born 1977), Mexican professional football goalkeeper
- Michel Esdras Bernier (1841–1921), Canadian politician
