= Stumpp =

Stumpp is a surname. Notable people with the surname include:

- Christina Stumpp (born 1987), German politician
- Emil Stumpp (1886–1941), German painter, teacher, and artist
- Karl Stumpp (1896–1982), German ethnographer and leader of SS Special Command Unit Dr Karl Stumpp
- Margaret Stumpp (born 1952), American businessperson
- Margit Stumpp (born 1963), German politician
- Peter Stumpp (c.1535–1589), German serial killer and farmer
