= Sonia Burgess =

British immigration lawyer

- Sonia Burgess in July 2010
- Born: 25 September 1947; Castleford, West Yorkshire, England
- Died: 25 October 2010 (aged 63); London, England
- Education: St Catharine's College, Cambridge (law, 1969)
- Occupation: Solicitor
- Years active: 1969–2010
- Employers: Winstanley-Burgess solicitors (1975–2003); Luqmani Thompson & Partners; Medical Foundation for the Care of Victims of Torture
- Known for: Asylum/immigration services
- Notable work: M v. Home Office (1993); Chahal v. United Kingdom (1996)

Sonia Burgess (born David Burgess; 25 September 1947 – 25 October 2010) was a leading British immigration lawyer. Winstanley-Burgess solicitors, co-founded by Burgess in 1975, became one of the UK's "most respected asylum and immigration law practices".

Burgess initiated several important cases, including M v. Home Office (1993), described by legal scholar William Wade as "the most significant constitutional case [in the UK] for more than 200 years", and Chahal v. United Kingdom (1996), in which the European Court of Human Rights confirmed the scope of its protection against deportation.

== Early life and education ==
Burgess grew up in Castleford, West Yorkshire, with her mother, Comfort, a secondary-school headteacher, and older sister, Ros. Her father was absent. From 1959 to 1966, she attended Ermysted's Grammar School in Skipton as a boarder, where she was a fan of rugby league. After Ermysted's, she studied law at St Catharine's College, Cambridge, graduating with an upper second in 1969.

== Career and marriage ==
=== Winstanley-Burgess ===
After training in Skipton, Burgess moved to London, where in 1972 she worked at Dawson & Co in Lincoln's Inn with Robert Winstanley, a friend from Cambridge, and did voluntary work for the Joint Council for the Welfare of Immigrants. In 1975, she and Winstanley founded Winstanley-Burgess solicitors above a Pizza Hut in Islington. The barrister Frances Webber wrote that the company, a legal-aid firm specializing in asylum work, "soon set the standard for all legal aid immigration practices for its superb work and tenacious dedication to refugee rights". Harriet Wistrich trained at Winstanley-Burgess from 1995 to 1997.

Burgess acquired a reputation for showing great kindness to her clients, helping them financially and with housing. Jawaid Luqmani of Luqmani Thompson called her "extraordinarily talented, with an encyclopedic grasp of the law" and someone who had "almost no ego". In an obituary for Burgess, Stephen Whittle noted that the Winstanley-Burgess offices reflected its partners' priorities: "I entered a dark, dingy, decaying building on the East London Road, where dirty magnolia woodchip papered stud wall partitions, with holes where they had been torn and kicked in frustration by the firm's clients, and which looked as if they would collapse at any moment. ... Rarely did money change hands."

MP David Winnick paid tribute to Burgess in the House of Commons in 1997, telling MPs that "in Government circles", Burgess was "probably looked upon as one of those difficult characters who pursue matters when they should not and who become over-interested in civil liberties. It is a good job that we have such people in Britain. The rule of law and the democratic process is strengthened by such solicitors."

=== Marriage ===
In 1985, Burgess married Youdon Lhamo, a Tibetan refugee working as a nurse in the UK and one of Winstanley-Burgess's former clients. The couple set up home in Highbury and had three children—two biological and one adopted (Lhamo's biological niece). Burgess, who was transgender, began to transition from male to female during the marriage, adopting the name Sonia Burgess, but she continued to practise law as David. From 1992 until 2002, she represented Press For Change sometimes or always pro bono, a group co-founded by Stephen Whittle that campaigns for transgender rights.

=== Cases ===
In Rees v. the United Kingdom (1986), Burgess represented Mark Rees, a British trans man who asked the government to amend his birth certificate to allow him to marry a woman. Burgess and Rees's barrister, Nick Blake, argued unsuccessfully that English law violated the European Convention on Human Rights Article 8 (right to respect for private and family life) and Article 12 (right to marry) in its treatment of transgender people. Also in 1986, Burgess represented Viraj Mendis, a Sri Lankan national who claimed the right of sanctuary at the Church of the Ascension in Hulme, Manchester.

Winstanley-Burgess obtained several landmark decisions or changes in the law. As a result of Vilvarajah and others v the United Kingdom (1991), British law was changed to allow asylum seekers to appeal against refusal of asylum without having to leave the country. A group of 52 Sri Lankan Tamil asylum seekers had been refused entry to the UK in 1987. Burgess stopped their deportation by requesting a judicial review of the decision not to grant them asylum. The men stripped down to their underwear on the tarmac in an effort to slow down their removal. Burgess won at the court of appeal, but the House of Lords overturned the decision, and the group was sent back to Sri Lanka. Burgess and another lawyer travelled to Sri Lanka, located the group, gathered evidence of their mistreatment, and appealed to the European Court of Human Rights (ECHR). The appeal was unsuccessful, but in response to the case the British government changed the law.

In M v. Home Office (1993), the asylum application of M., a teacher from Zaire who arrived in the UK in 1990, had been refused. Thirty minutes before the aircraft deporting him was due to take off, Burgess applied to a duty judge to defer removal. This was ignored. Burgess visited a judge at home at 12:30 am; the judge ordered that M. be met in Zaire by officials from the British Embassy and returned to the UK. Acting on legal advice, Home Secretary Kenneth Baker countermanded this, and Burgess began proceedings against the Home Office and Home Secretary for contempt of court. The High Court ruled against M., the Court of Appeal overturned that decision, and the Law Lords upheld the decision of the Court of Appeal, ruling that "ministers and officials may be liable for contempt of court and that injunctions and other legal remedies are available against them". The government was required to pay costs. According to the legal scholar William Wade, M v. Home Office "put the rule of law back in place".

In another case initiated by Burgess, Chahal v. United Kingdom (1996), involving the deportation to India of a Sikh separatist, the ECHR ruled that Article 3 of the European Convention on Human Rights "provides an absolute prohibition of torture". Even if there are compelling grounds to suppose that a deportee is engaged in terrorism, they cannot be deported if doing so would place them at risk of torture. The case meant that terrorist suspects arrested in the UK after 9/11 could not be deported.

=== Later career ===
Robert Winstanley left Winstanley-Burgess in 1996 to become a judge, and in August 2003 Burgess closed the company, blaming high costs and low legal aid payments. The Law Society Gazette reported that the company, when it closed, consisted of five partners, three assistant solicitors, three caseworkers, two trainees, and 11 support staff. Burgess wrote in Independent Lawyer in 2003 that she was exhausted from "working 13-hour days, plus weekends, and earning about the same as a teacher", and that although "you'll be lucky to make a profit, let alone fund a pension, the media will shamelessly libel you as a legal aid millionaire." She took a year off to study Tibetan Buddhism in Tibet, and when she returned to England in 2005, she and her spouse separated. Burgess moved to an apartment in Cambridge Circus, central London, and lived as Sonia when not working. As David, she worked for Luqmani Thompson & Partners, an immigration law firm, and for the Medical Foundation for the Care of Victims of Torture.

== Death ==
In October 2010, Burgess was killed after being pushed in front of a Piccadilly Line tube train at King's Cross St Pancras tube station in central London during the evening rush hour. A member of the public grabbed the perpetrator, 34-year-old Senthooran Kanagasingham, whom Burgess had befriended, shouting: "What have you done?" Kanagasingham is reported to have replied: "I'm guilty, I'm guilty. I surrender." According to the prosecution, CCTV footage showed Kanagasingham with both hands in the middle of Burgess's back, bending the knee to gain "maximum force" to push Burgess onto the track.

At the time of the killing, Kanagasingham used the name Nina and was undergoing gender reassignment from male to female, but he later asked to be referred to as male. After meeting Kanagasingham in 2009, Burgess had been helping him, including with financial support. They had just visited Kanagasingham's family doctor in Cricklewood; Burgess had expressed concern to the doctor about Kanagasingham's mental health, but Kanagasingham had disagreed with Burgess about it in the doctor's presence. One hour later, Burgess was pushed under an eastbound train. Around 600 people attended her funeral service at St Martin-in-the-Fields in November 2010. As a result of witnessing her death, Nathalie McDermott founded All About Trans in October 2011 as a tribute to her.

In December 2011, a jury at the Old Bailey found Kanagasingham, who had schizophrenia, guilty of manslaughter on the grounds of diminished responsibility, and he was sentenced to life imprisonment with an order that he serve at least seven years. He was found dead on 8 April 2013 in his prison cell in Belmarsh Prison with a plastic bag over his head.

== Selected works ==
=== Writing ===
- with Richard Ekins (February 1986). "Transexualism, birth registration and the right to marry: Schedule of legislative and case law developments in Europe". Tel Aviv, Israel: Symposium on Psycho-Legal Aspects of Sexual Problems. 2nd International Congress on Psychiatry, Law and Ethics.

=== Key cases ===
- R v. Secretary of State for the Home Department, Ex parte Sivakumaran and Conjoined Appeals (UN High Commissioner for Refugees Intervening) [1988] AC 958, House of Lords, 16 December 1987.
- Mendis v. Immigration Appeal Tribunal and Secretary of State for the Home Department, [1989] Imm AR 6, Court of Appeal, 17 June 1988.
- Vilvarajah and others v. the United Kingdom, European Court of Human Rights, 26 September 1991.
- The Queen v. Immigration Appeal Tribunal, ex parte Gustaff Desiderius Antonissen (Free movement of persons) [1991] EUECJ C-292/89 (26 February 1991), Court of Justice of the European Union.
- M v. Home Office [1992] QB 270.
- Chahal v. United Kingdom, European Court of Human Rights, 1996.
- X, Y and Z v. United Kingdom, European Court of Human Rights, 1996. Application no: 75/1995/581/667
- A v. Chief Constable of the West Yorkshire Police & Anor [2002] EWCA Civ 1584 (5 November 2002), Court of Appeal
- R (Tamil Information Centre) v. Secretary of State for the Home Department [2002] EWHC 2155 (Admin) (18 October 2002), Administrative Court.
- Razgar, R (on the application of) v. Secretary of State for the Home Department [2003] EWCA Civ 840 (19 June 2003), Court of Appeal.
