= Wegmann =

Wegmann is a German surname. Notable people with the surname include:

- Alain Wegmann (born 1958), Swiss professor of systemic modeling
- Alice Wegmann (born 1995), Brazilian actress
- August Wegmann (1888-1976), German politician (Centre Pary; CDU)
- Christian Wegmann (born 1976), German cyclist
- Fabian Wegmann (born 1980), German road racing cyclist
- Günther Wegmann, German Luftwaffe fighter ace during World War II
- Jürgen Wegmann (born 1964), German football player
- Uwe Wegmann (born 1964), German football coach and a retired player
- Karl W. Wegmann, American professor of geology

== See also ==
- Krauss-Maffei Wegmann, a German defence company
- Henschel-Wegmann Train, a passenger express train operated by the Deutsche Reichsbahn in Germany
- Wegman
- Wegmann & Co., a German coachbuilding company
