= Bowick =

Bowick is a surname. Notable people with the surname include:

- Chastity Bowick (born 1985), American transgender and social justice activist
- Mark Bowick (born 1957), theoretical physicist
- Tony Bowick (born 1966), American football player
