= List of protected heritage sites in Verlaine =

Beschermd erfgoed in Walloon town

This table shows an overview of the protected heritage sites in the Walloon town Verlaine. This list is part of Belgium's national heritage.

Object	Year/architect	Town/section	Address	Coordinates	Number^{?}	Image
Tumulus of Verlaine and surroundings ^{(nl)} ^{(fr)}		Verlaine		50.614166°N 5.306502°E	61063-CLT-0001-01 Info	Tumulus van Verlaine en omgeving
Tumulus of Verlaine, the archeological site ^{(nl)} ^{(fr)}		Verlaine		50.614166°N 5.306502°E	61063-PEX-0001-01 Info	Tumulus van Verlaine, de archeologische site

== See also ==
- List of protected heritage sites in Liège (province)
- Verlaine
