= SECRET GUYZ =

Japanese transgender boy band

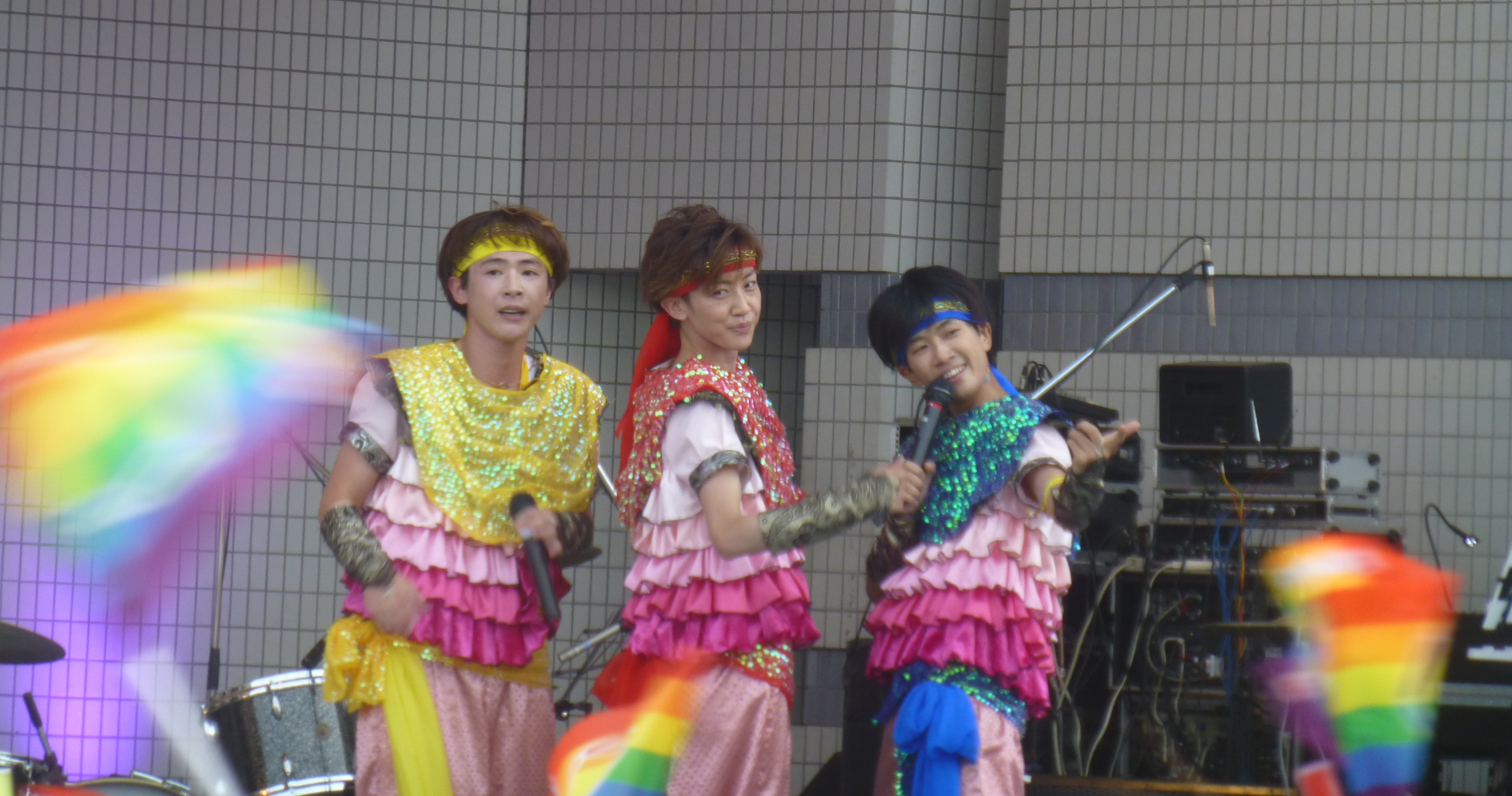
- SECRET GUYZ at Tokyo Rainbow Pride, 2016

Background information
- Origin: Japan
- Genres: J-pop; Boyband
- Years active: 2012–2018
- Label: Stardust Promotion
- Past members: Yoshihara Shute; Yukichi; Ideka Taiki

SECRET GUYZ was a Japanese music group belonging to Stardust Promotion. They are considered to be Japan's first talent unit consisting of transgender men. They were a new age idol group, aiming to spread more understanding of the LGBTQ community to the public. Their catchphrase was “Stardust's Rainbow Idols”.

== Members ==
- Yoshihara Shute (born September 30, 1985, in Shizuoka Prefecture)
- Yukichi (born 18 August 1984 in Osaka)
- Ideka Taiki

== History ==
SECRET GUYZ formed in 2012 as a dance and singing group, and released their first single, "HUGxHUG", on CD on 10 July 2013.

SECRET GUYZ continued activity until 12 January 2018, when they announced their official disbandment. They held their last live concert in Shibuya on 12 February the same year.

== Discography ==
Number	Title	Release date	Highest rank (Oricon)	Tracks	Music video
1	HUG×HUG	10 July 2013	-	HUG×HUG ラメラメラ★薔薇 (Lamelamela ★ Rose)	MV; MV
2	My Monster Lovely	19 November 2014	#27 (Daily)	My Monster Lovely 頑張るじぇ！！！(Good Luck!!!)	MV; MV
3	スーハーマン。。(Su Herman)	22 April 2015	#11 (Daily) #21 (Weekly)	スーハーマン。。(Su Herman) ジェントルメン (Gentlemen)	MV; MV
4	SKY MARCH	7 October 2015	#8 (Daily) #11 (Weekly)	SKY MARCH ハッピー♡厨毒 (Happy ♡ Kitchen Poison) Mr.Lady〜Le Salone Ebiz 803〜	MV
5	私のカレーは世界一 (My Curry is the Best in the World)	18 May 2016	#6 (Daily) #7 (Weekly)	私のカレーは世界一 (My Curry is the Best in the World) 私の彼は日本一 (My Man is the Best in Japan) ジェンダーツイスト (Gender Twist) きみと星の王子さま (You and the Star Prince)	MV
6	OH, MY GiRL！？～夏をあきらめて。冷やし中華終わりました。～ (Giving Up Summer. Cold Summer is Over)	30 November 2016	#4 (Daily) #12 (Weekly)	OH, MY GiRL！？～夏をあきらめて。冷やし中華終わりました。～ (Giving Up Summer. Cold Summer is Over) 青天のヘキレキ！(Blue Sky Hekireki!) I Sell You ジャッヂメントタイム（審判の時） (Judgement Time (During The Trial))	MV
7	悩めるヒーロー (Hero in Distress)	17 May 2017	#6 (Daily) #9 (Weekly)	悩めるヒーロー (Hero in Distress) カラフルマップ (Colourful Map) ARIGATO We are SGZ～イケイケ GO×2!!!!	MV
8	TRANS MAGICIAN	8 November 2017	#18 (Weekly)	TRANS MAGICIAN ∞～My future～ 吠えろ！E☆O! (Howl, E☆O!) 壱・弐・秘密的男人体操（イーアールシークレットタイソウ）(1.2.2 Secret male gymnastics (e.r. Secret Taiso))	-
