= Cam Lyman =

Multimillionaire dog breeder and suspected murder victim

- Born: September 4, 1932; Westwood, Massachusetts, U.S.
- Disappeared: c. July 1987 (aged 54); Hopkinton, Rhode Island, U.S.
- Status: Declared dead in absentia June 1995
- Body discovered: September 24, 1997, Hopkinton, Rhode Island, U.S.
- Occupation: Dog breeder

Cam Lyman (September 4, 1932 – c. 1987) was a multimillionaire breeder of champion Clumber spaniels and Bernese mountain dogs, who notably died under mysterious circumstances. Lyman's father was Arthur T. Lyman, a prominent Bostonian and scion of the wealthy Lyman family who made their money in the China trade and later in cotton mills and the cotton trade. Lyman was a trans man.

Lyman disappeared in 1987 and was declared dead in 1995.

== Biography ==
Lyman bred and trained Clumber spaniels and Bernese mountain dogs, and was well known for being talented but rather reclusive. After the death of his father from lung cancer in 1968, Lyman began to withdraw from his remaining family, moving from the family estate "Ricefields" on Thacher Street in Westwood, Massachusetts, to a home in Rhode Island, wearing men's clothing, and reportedly taking steroids prescribed for his dogs to grow a mustache, as well as wearing his hair in a traditionally masculine hairstyle. By 1985, he had the typical appearance of a male (according to some, he looked startlingly similar to his deceased father by this time) and went by the name Cam. It was during this time that Lyman began to associate with a man named George O'Neil. O'Neil became caretaker of Lyman's estate, and fed, showed, and took care of his dogs.

In 1987, Lyman's relatives failed to receive the customary Christmas card from him. They investigated his disappearance and discovered that no one had seen or heard from Lyman in months. Police questioned O'Neil, who claimed that in the summer of 1987, either July 18th, 19th, or 20th, he and Lyman had a fight over the phone about the dogs, and Lyman hung up on him. The next day, O'Neil went over to Lyman's house and found the phone ripped out of the wall and the doors wide open. O'Neil claimed that he believed Lyman had gone to Europe to undergo sexual reassignment surgery. However, O'Neil failed to provide police any proof that Lyman had gone to Europe. O'Neil also failed to explain why he had not informed anyone of Lyman's disappearance for nearly six months.

On September 24, 1997, Lyman's body was found in a septic tank on his estate in Hopkinton, Rhode Island, by owners who had recently purchased the house. His final will named the American Kennel Club's Museum of the Dog as the sole beneficiary. The story was featured on Unsolved Mysteries, but as of 2011, no one has ever been charged in the case.

In 2003, George O'Neil was indicted for embezzling $15,000 from Lyman's estate. O'Neil was sentenced to one year of probation and ordered to pay $450 in court costs. He died in 2011 without giving any more information on Cam Lyman's death.

== See also ==
- List of solved missing person cases: 1950–1999
- List of transgender people
- List of transgender-related topics
- List of unsolved deaths
