= Sikêra Júnior =

Brazilian television presenter

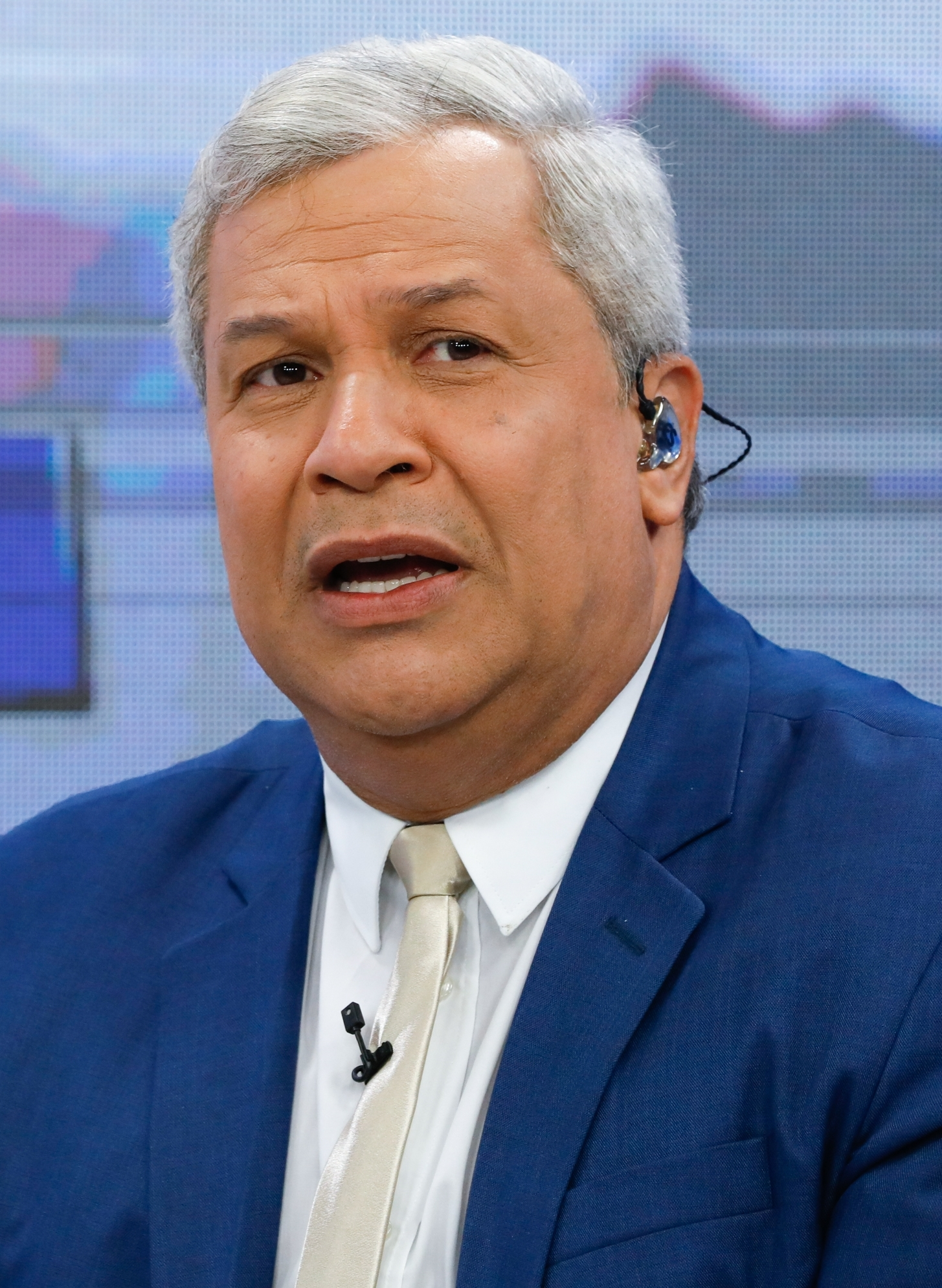
- Sikêra in 2021
- Born: José Siqueira Barros Júnior; 17 June 1966 (age 60); Palmares, Pernambuco, Brazil
- Occupation: Television presenter · radio host · actor

José Siqueira Barros Júnior, better known as Sikêra Júnior (born 17 June 1966), is a Brazilian television presenter, singer, radio host, and actor. He currently hosts the regional news program Alerta on TV A Crítica, in Manaus. Between 2020 and 2023, he hosted Alerta Nacional, on RedeTV!, broadcast nationwide. Sikêra Júnior is also known for being controversial and making statements considered racist, homophobic, sexist and misogynistic, as well as denialists about COVID-19.

Born in Palmares, Pernambuco, he began his career in radio at the age of 14. In 2000, he joined TV Alagoas (now TV Ponta Verde) as a reporter and, at the end of 2016, went viral on social media after putting a "hex" against marijuana users. His performances on TV became memes and spread quickly across the internet. Sikêra has over 6 million followers on Instagram and a YouTube channel with around 5 million subscribers.

== Career ==
Born in Palmares, he began his radio career at the age of 14 at Rádio Cultura dos Palmares. While still in Pernambuco, he worked at other radio stations in the region and at Globo Nordeste.

In 2000, he joined TV Alagoas (now TV Ponta Verde) as a reporter. In 2012, he took over as the host of Plantão Alagoas. At the end of 2016, he went viral on social media after putting a "hex" against marijuana users and stating that "they would die before Christmas". However, his success almost changed completely at the end of that year, as Sikêra suffered a heart attack that almost killed him, causing him to take a break from hosting Plantão Alagoas for a while. After being away for a month due to a heart attack in early 2017, he surprised the public by returning to his program inside a coffin and making new provocations to marijuana users.

In 2018, he accepted a proposal from Sistema Arapuan de Comunicação, in João Pessoa, with whom he signed a contract to present the news program Cidade em Ação, on TV Arapuan, at the time affiliated with RedeTV!, which premiered on March 12, 2018.

On June 14, 2019, he presented the program Cidade em Ação for the last time and left TV Arapuan, in João Pessoa, to sign with TV A Crítica, in Manaus, where he presented the program Alerta Amazonas, which premiered on July 23, 2019.

In December 2019, he was announced as a presenter for RedeTV!, where he hosted Alerta Nacional, his first program broadcast nationwide and also the first program broadcast nationwide generated from Manaus. The program tripled the channel's audience numbers compared to those previously recorded by the broadcaster in that time slot. However, over the years, with the low audience and the negative repercussions that the program and the presenter had, RedeTV! announced in 2023 the termination of the contract with Sikêra Júnior and the end of the partnership with TV A Crítica.

After his dismissal by RedeTV!, the presenter returned to TV A Crítica for the program Alerta, which was renamed Novo Alerta and, later, Alerta com Sikêra Jr.

Sikêra Júnior is also the lead singer of a rock band called Sikêra Jr. e Banda Manicômio. He appeared in a Brazilian comedy film titled Exterminadores do Além contra a Loira do Banheiro.

== Controversies ==
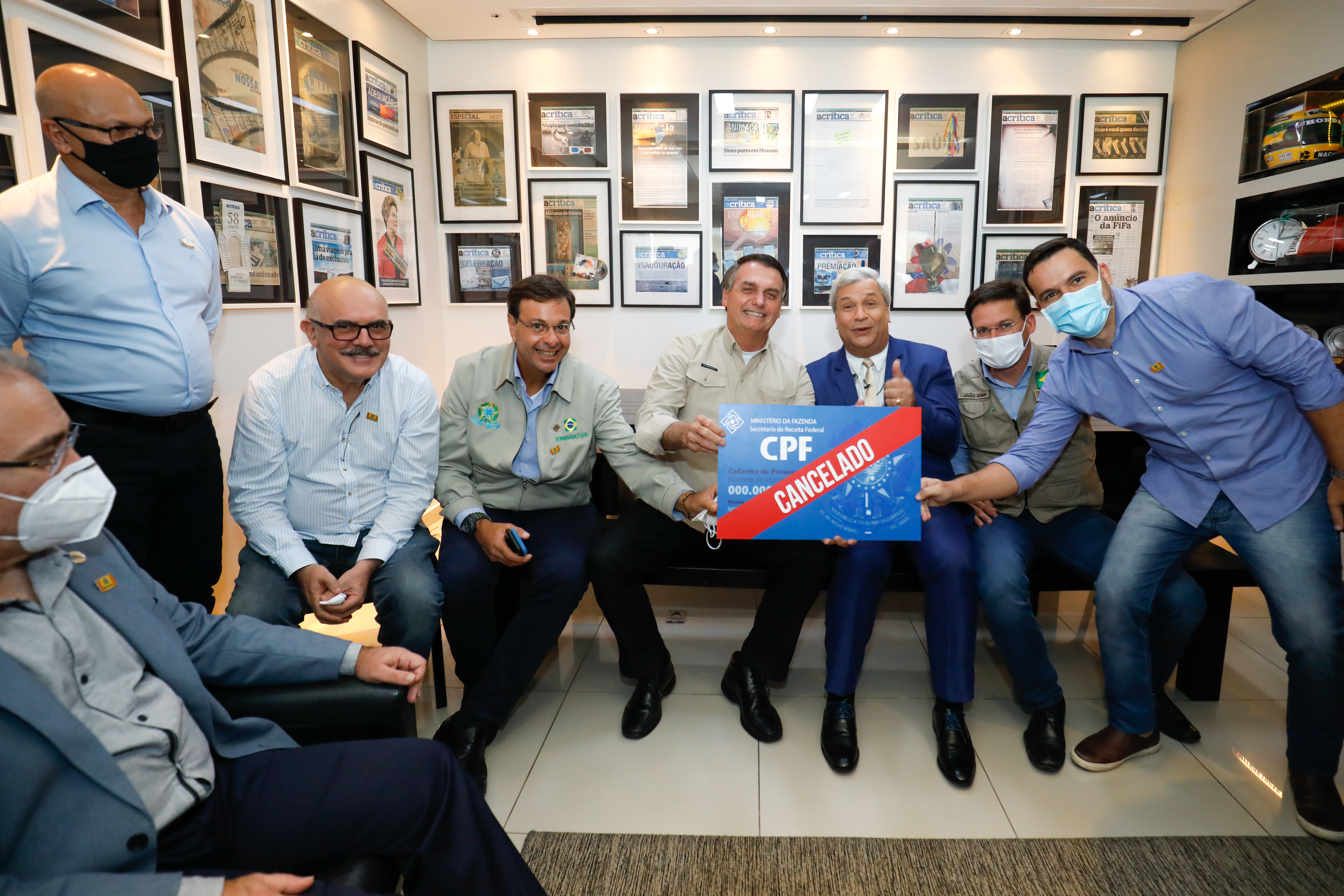
Sikêra Júnior and Jair Bolsonaro pose for a photo displaying a "CPF canceled" sign

Sikêra Júnior is known for making several statements considered racist, homophobic, sexist and misogynistic, as well as denialist statements about COVID-19. In August 2020, the presenter was ordered to pay R$30,000 reais to transsexual model Viviany Beleboni for calling her a "disgraceful race" while showing, on his program, an image of her represented as Jesus crucified during the 19th LGBT Pride Parade of São Paulo, held on Avenida Paulista in 2015. In November 2024, the Court of Justice of Amazonas (TJAM) sentenced the presenter to two years in prison for statements made against the LGBT community, such as associating the crime of pedophilia and drug use with homosexuals. However, Sikêra was authorized to have his custodial sentence replaced by two restrictive sentences, and must serve it by providing community service for a period and times to be established. Due to his statements, 43 companies suspended advertising on his program and presenter Nathalia Arcuri decided to leave RedeTV! because she did not agree with Sikêra Júnior's comments.

In January 2026, the Federal Public Prosecutor's Office sentenced Sikêra Jr. to three years and six months in prison, but the prison sentence was replaced with community service and payments to LGBTQIA+ institutions.

In October 2024, the Court of Justice of São Paulo ordered RedeTV! and presenter Sikêra Júnior to pay R$20,000 in compensation to an Uber driver falsely accused of being a "criminal" and a "rapist" during the Alerta Nacional program in 2022.

In 2021, the Federal Public Ministry requested compensation of R$200,000 from a black woman whose dignity was offended by Sikêra in 2018, on the program Cidade em Ação, where he stated that "a woman who doesn't paint her nails is greasy and disgusting" and that the woman's nostrils looked like a "donkey's nostril".

Like Jair Bolsonaro, the presenter had been taking a stance against social isolation, downplaying the disease in some aspects amid the COVID-19 pandemic. He also defended treatments with no proven efficacy against the disease, such as chloroquine. According to a document presented to the COVID-19 CPI by the Secretariat of Social Communication in June 2021, the Jair Bolsonaro government transferred R$120,000 in fees to the presenter under the justification that he had participated in seven government advertising campaigns, among them the 'Early Care for COVID-19', which recommended treatment immediately after the first symptoms, for which Sikêra received R$24,000.
