= TransMilitary =

2018 film directed by Gabriel Silverman and Fiona Dawson

- Theatrical poster
- Directed by: Gabriel Silverman and Fiona Dawson
- Written by: Jamie Coughlin; Gabriel Silverman
- Produced by: Jamie Coughlin; Fiona Dawson; Gabriel Silverman
- Starring: El Cook; Jesse Ehrenfeld; Sue Fulton; Logan Ireland; Jennifer Peace; Laila Villanueva
- Cinematography: Gabriel Silverman
- Edited by: Gil Seltzer
- Music by: Mark Degli Antoni
- Release date: March 10, 2018 (SXSW)
- Running time: 93 minutes
- Country: United States
- Language: English

TransMilitary is a 2018 American documentary film directed by Gabriel Silverman and Fiona Dawson, about transgender service members fighting to serve openly in the U.S. military. The film premiered at the South by Southwest Film Festival in 2018, and was released in the United States on January 8, 2019.

TransMilitary was the first documentary feature to receive financial assistance from GLAAD Media Institute.

== Synopsis ==
Building upon the short New York Times op-doc, Transgender, at War and in Love (2015), this feature documents the lives of four American active duty transgender troops who are advocating to end the ban on their service. The film gives insight into their familial, personal and professional lives, which represent approximately 15,500 transgender service members within America's all-volunteer military. After a series of secret meetings with top brass officials inside the Pentagon, their policy battle is won. But President Trump's tweets in 2017 flip their lives upside down yet again, leaving them with the question of if they will be finally granted the right to serve.

== Appearances ==
- El Cook
- Logan Ireland
- Jennifer Peace
- Laila Villanueva
- Sue Fulton
- Jesse M. Ehrenfeld
- James P. Isenhower III
- Eric Fanning
- Emma Thompson
- Daniel Fisher

== Release ==
TransMilitary premiered at SXSW on March 10, 2018, where it won the Audience Award. Shortly after, the film entered more than 10 film festivals and won several awards. TransMilitary made its television debut on Logo TV in November 2018.

== Reception ==
On Rotten Tomatoes, the film has an approval rating of 100% based on 11 reviews. Beth Sullivan of Austin Chronicle calls it "informative and visually engaging". John DeFore of Hollywood Reporter calls TransMilitary "an affecting and, despite present circumstances, hopeful doc". Jacqueline Coley of Rotten Tomatoes picks TransMilitary as one of "the 8 best films [she] saw at SXSW 2018".
