= Michelle Suárez Bértora =

Uruguayan activist (1983–2022)

- Born: 21 February 1983; Salinas, Uruguay
- Died: 22 April 2022 (aged 39); Montevideo, Uruguay
- Education: University of the Republic
- Occupations: Lawyer, politician, writer
- Title: Substitute Senator
- Term: 2014–2017 (resigned)
- Political party: Broad Front

Michelle Suárez Bértora (21 February 1983 – 22 April 2022) was a Uruguayan activist, lawyer, lecturer, politician, and writer. She was Uruguay's first openly transgender university graduate, first openly trans lawyer, and first openly transgender person elected to office.

== Biography ==
Michelle Suárez Bértora was born 21 February 1983 in Salinas, Canelones Department, Uruguay. She transitioned at the age of 15 with the support of her mother. Studious, she followed her dream and became an attorney. Suárez went to primary and secondary school in Salinas before entering university in 2004. After six years of study, and a legal transition to allow her to graduate with her proper gender, Suárez earned her doctorate. She was the first (and only) trans-woman to become a lawyer in Uruguay graduating in 2010 from the University of the Republic as the first openly transgender person to complete university studies in the country. In 2014, she also became the first openly transgender person elected to the Uruguayan legislature.

Suárez was a member of, and the legal adviser to, the organization "Ovejas Negras" (Black Sheep), an LGBT rights organization. She joined in 2010, shortly after the death of her mother. Working was cathartic for dealing with her grief and she immediately set out to draft the equal marriage proposal, which was presented to Congress in 2011. The bill initially passed the Senate in 2012 and after review by the judicial committee received final approval in 2013.

Suárez was also a body-image activist. Constantly asked about her obesity, she recognized that women must follow a rigid aesthetic. She has said it is sometimes even more of a struggle for transgender individuals, as multiple minorities. The stereotype of young, "modelish," and eternally beautiful in Suárez's view is absurd and oppressive for all women.

Suárez's belief was that prejudices must be addressed by legal standards which are substantive and accompanied by public debate. She has written a book to address implementation of human rights for those who have difficulties because of their orientation or gender identity.

Suárez was sworn into the Uruguayan senate in October 2017, becoming the first openly transgender senator in the nation's history. In December 2017, Suarez resigned her seat in the senate after she was found guilty in a criminal investigation of forging legal documents while working as an attorney.

In 2022 Suárez was hospitalised due to heart complications and later died from a heart attack on 23 April 2022, at the age of 39.

== Selected works ==
- 2012, Hacia una Igualdad Sustantiva Mujer y Salud en Uruguay (ISBN 978-9974-8303-1-8)

== See also ==
- List of transgender people
