= Popó Vaz =

Brazilian police officer and activist (1985–2022)

- Born: Paulo Vaz; 4 July 1985; Belo Horizonte, Brazil
- Died: 14 March 2022 (aged 36); São Paulo, Brazil
- Occupations: Police officer; activist; digital influencer

Paulo "Popó" Vaz (4 July 1985 – 14 March 2022) was a Brazilian police officer, activist, and digital influencer.

== Biography ==
Paulo was gay and a trans man who began his gender transition process in 2016. He became known for being one of the few transgender men working in the police force. Vaz used social media as a platform to defend LGBTQ rights, especially transgender rights. He was married to YouTuber Pedro HMC, from the channel Põe na Roda, since 2019. As a content creator, he made humorous videos and others about masculinizing hormone therapy.

As a Civil Police investigator since April 2018, Vaz spoke about the importance of supporting and inspiring more trans men to pursue a career in law enforcement. He stated that, by being in the police force, he could show that anyone could also follow this path and combat prejudice.

== Death ==
Vaz died at the age of 36 in São Paulo. In an interview with Leo Dias, Pedro HMC said that the cause of death was suicide.

The death of Vaz generated widespread repercussions on social media, where various entities and personalities expressed their condolences, such as politicians Erika Hilton and Fabiano Contarato, and the Associação Nacional de Travestis e Transexuais.

Three months after Paulo's death, Pedro HMC came forward to speak about what happened. At the time, HMC discussed the repercussions of his leaked sex tape, which led to transphobic attacks against Vaz and allegedly motivated his suicide.

In 2023, a book in his honor was released, called Paulo Vaz, fragmentos. The profits from the book sales were to be donated to transgender rights organizations.
