= Lady Paula Howard =

(1912–2000) drag performer and trans personality

Lady Paula Howard (born Robert John Donald Burnie) (28 January 1912 – 22 September 2000) was an Australian drag performer and transgender writer, media personality and advocate. She first performed in drag to entertain the troops in World War II and, after this, while living in South Africa and then in Australia, began living publicly as a woman. She was also an early and influential member of the Seahorse Society Victoria, an advocacy organisation for transgender people in Victoria.

== Early life ==
Howard was born in Swansea, Wales as the eldest child of Donald and Alice Mabel (née Harvey). She was assigned male at birth and in 1915, when she was a small child, her father died while serving in Loos during World War I. Howard would later recall her early interest in dressing in 'girl's clothing' and performing.

She went on to complete her schooling locally and then to train and work as an accountant at a firm which had been founded by her maternal grandfather; she qualified as a chartered accountant in 1938. The 1930s was also when she began dressing as a woman while in private.

On 8 April 1939 she married Joy Agnes Diana Probert and the couple would go on to have two daughters Rosalind (b. 1941) and Joy (b. 1955).

== World War II service ==
With the outbreak of World War II Howard enlisted into the Royal Army Service Corps in August 1939 which sent her to France with the British Expeditionary Force and it was then that she began publicly performing in drag in shows designed to entertain the troops. She was formally commissioned on 21 February 1940 and was injured as part of the Dunkirk evacuation after which time she spent a number of months in hospital.

After her injury Howard returned and, by 1944, achieved the rank of major and served with the 21st Army Group at the administrative headquarters in France where she was 'in and out of high drag'. On 4 April 1946 she was mentioned in dispatches from there for her distinguished service.

== Life in South Africa ==
Immediately following the War Howard worked for Dunlop Rubber in Birmingham until, in March 1948, she was transferred to their offices in Durban, South Africa where she was appointed chief internal auditor. She then took on a number of roles at different organisations and, as she did so, began to experiment further with what she then called her 'female persona'.

In 1957 she left her first wife Joy and began living as a woman as much as she felt the society of the day would allow. Soon after she met and married (30 June 1958) Carole Muriel Aldred Revelas (née Palmer) who owned and ran a charm school and modelling agency in Johannesburg. Carole was aware of Howard's gender identity and was supportive of her as she became increasingly confident in representing herself publicly as a woman; included in this was Howard completing Carole's charm school and she appreciated her help in transforming her into a 'well groomed' woman. She also began helping Carole run the school as an assistant.

The couple then moved to Cape Town where Howard became involved in the international trans community through organisations like the Phoenix Club (which was based in South Africa) and Transvestia (an American-based publication for and by trans people). In 1964, she began publishing articles about her life in Transvestia, Fanfare Magazine (published by the Phoenix Club) and other publications. In 1959 she also secured an entry for herself, as a woman, in the Who's Who of Southern Africa. The entry, however, contained many untruths; including that she was descended from aristocracy.

Sometime in the early 1970s Howard's marriage to Carole broke down. She decided to leave South Africa in 1972 and, after a brief period in New Zealand, moved to Australia in 1973.

== Life in Australia ==
In 1973 Howard settled in Melbourne and it was there that she decided to live her life entirely as Lady Paula Howard. In this early period she lived in a share house in Kew with other transwomen until moving to Toorak in 1975, where she felt accepted by the community and was well known in the socialite circles. She drew significant attention from the media when she began to wear period pieces, including elaborate 'old fashioned' gowns, to Oaks Day at the Flemington Racecourse. She was twice given awards for her costumes and in 1983 she was also featured on the news curtseying to Prince Charles and Princess Diana during a reception for them at the Melbourne Concert Hall.

Of her life in Australia she said that:

I have found that folk [in Australia] are quite relaxed in their attitudes toward me and my necessities. In shops, offices, beauty salons, theatre foyers, the member's enclosure at cricket matches or at the races and in my friendly neighborhood wine bar, I am taken at my own evaluation. Happy with that casual acceptance, I carefully avoid pressing my luck.

— Lady Paula Howard, The loneliness of the long-distance cross dresser, Outreach Newsletter, Fall 1984

In this article, however, she also detailed the issues and discrimination she did face.

=== The Seahorse Club Victoria ===
From 1976 Howard was involved in, although not a founding member of, the Seahorse Club Victoria; this was the Victorian chapter of the Seahorse Society of New South Wales which had started in 1971. Howard attended many of their events and seminars before eventually joining. Within the Seahorse Club she was seen as a polarising figure and, when she became the editor of their newsletter (the Australian Seahorse Bulletin) in 1981, she used her role to criticise the organisation's leadership and ways of viewing some of the issues that they faced in the wider community and well as within the club. In June 1982 she was removed from her position of editor for a period of time before being able to return.

An example of her opposition is seen in the June 1984 issue of the Seahorse Bulletin where she claimed that the club's determination to differentiate between transvestism and transexuality do violence to the community and made people stay away from the club. (Note: This section refers to outdated terms which are now seen as offensive but were in common use during Howard's life and used by her.) In the next issue, July 1984, she stated that the September bulletin would be her last as editor and that, from then, it would be missing her 'particularly wide-ranging, informative, opinionated, cynical, abrasive and completely disillusioned style'.

At some point in the mid-1980s her membership was revoked entirely. When she tried to rejoin the club in 1987 eleven members threatened to resign.

Despite this Howard was awarded with a lifetime membership of the Seahorse Club in 1995; this was the first they ever awarded.

She was also involved in the Elaine Barrie Project which was a break-away group from the Seahorse Club which was created in 1979; this also was a support group for transgender people in Victoria.

=== Publications ===
While living in Melbourne Howard published two books; one under her birth name and the other under her chosen name of Lady Paula Howard:

- Burnie, Robert J. D. (1988) A Gathering of Lilacs. Adelaide: Flinders University Press (a collection of short stories, some of which had already been published elsewhere, like in Cleo, or entered into literary prizes).
- Howard, Lady Paula (1999). Frocks, Frills and Furbelows: The Story of Lady Paula Howard—an Embellished Biography of Transvestism Spanning Forty Years and Four Continents. Norwood, SA: Peacock Publications.

It is not known why she published A gathering of lilacs (1988) under her birth name.

== Later life and death ==
In 1994 Howard had a stroke which had significant long-term implications on her health. She died on 22 September 2000 at Katoomba in New South Wales.
