= Majur (singer) =

Brazilian musical artist (born 1995)

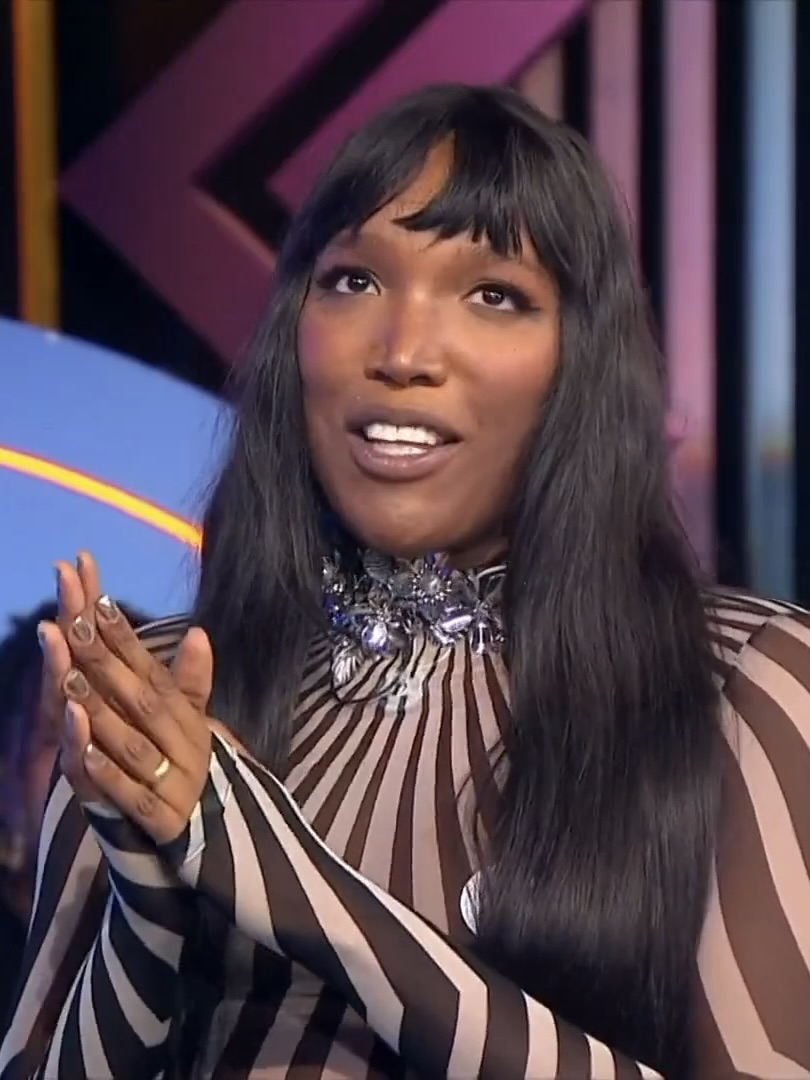
- Majur in 2023

Background information
- Born: Majur dos Santos Conceição; 21 October 1995 (age 30); Salvador, Bahia, Brazil
- Genres: Música popular brasileira; Alternative R&B; Afrobeat
- Occupations: Singer, songwriter
- Label: UNS Produções

Majur dos Santos Conceição (born 21 October 1995), known mononymously as Majur, is a Brazilian R&B and MPB singer-songwriter. She was described by Vogue Brasil as the "new voice of Bahia music".

== Biography ==
Majur was born Marilton Conceição Júnior on 21 October 1995 in the Uruguai neighborhood of Salvador, Bahia. Her father left the family when she was two or three years old; to survive, her mother collected garbage and recyclables in the streets until Majur was six. Majur's mother began a job at the Military Police College (CPM) Dendezeiros, where she enrolled Majur from age 16 or 17 along with her younger sister. Majur was expelled at age 19 for "indiscipline" as a result of her rejection of the college's masculine standards. While she wanted to study music at the Federal University of Bahia, she was unable to attend for financial reasons, instead majoring in design at Universidade Salvador starting in 2016. In 2018 she dropped out and took up a job in telemarketing.

=== Musical career ===
Majur began singing at the age of 5, first at church and then in the choir of the Youth Symphony Orchestra of Salvador, performing annual Christmas performances at Pelourinho. She also participated in CPM Dendezeiros's choir as a soloist. In 2008 she was a finalist at the Annual Student Song Festival, promoted by the Ministry of Education.

In 2016, Majur formed a band with five other musicians to perform at night in her hometown, inspired by Liniker, Tim Maia and Jorge Ben. The band sang in the bars of the neighborhood of Barra. Her profile was raised when she did a show at a party held by Caetano Veloso. In 2018, while bringing a loaned guitar to Liniker, she was invited by surprise to participate in an on-air duet of Liniker's song "Tua". She performed the song "Náufrago" alongside rapper Hiran at the 2019 Vogue Ball after the two met through the singer Marcia Castro.

Majur released her first EP in 2018, Colorir, also featuring Hiran. In June 2019, Majur appeared as a guest artist in Emicida's song AmarElo alongside Pablo Vittar. She released her first solo single, 20ever, in August of the same year. In November 2019, she released a music video for Naúfrago, the second track of her debut EP. In 2020 she released another single, Andarilho, accompanied by a video clip that she recorded herself during the COVID-19 pandemic.

In May 2021 her first studio LP was released, the Afropop album Ojunifé (Yoruba for "eyes of love"). It features collaborations with Liniker and Luedji Luna. In May 2023 she released her second studio album, ARRISCA, featuring nine tracks with an Afropop sound. Its production was done by Max Viana and includes collaborations with Xamã, Ivete Sangalo and Olodum. Majur released the 16-track Yoruba album Gira Mundo in May 2025, with each song dedicated to an orisha. According to Majur, "[d]espite highlighting religious intolerance and racism in Brazil, this album is not about religion."

Majur has described her work as world music and Afrofuturist, and heavily influenced by música popular brasileira (MPB). Her work addresses themes such as romantic relationships and female empowerment.

Majur became the first transfeminine model at Afro Fashion Day in 2018. In 2021, she became the first transgender person on the cover of Vogue Bride (Vogue Noiva).

=== Personal life ===
Majur has been described in media as a Black trans woman. She self-identifies as non-binary and uses she/her pronouns. "I transition very well between the masculine and feminine universes. I recognize both in myself and I need both", she explained in an interview with Extra. In the newspaper O Globo, she stated that she tries to avoid gender relations in her lyrics, since her image and daily life already speak for themselves:

My representation is already clear in my visuals. I don't want to restrict myself to the lyrics; my intention is to reach diverse audiences of all ages.

Majur legally changed her name in January 2020. In September 2022, the singer married choreographer Josué Amazonas. Majur practices Candomblé, though she was Catholic until the age of 14.

== Works ==
=== Discography ===
- Colorir (EP, 2018)
- Ojunifé (LP, 2021)
- ARRISCA (LP, 2023)
- Gira Mundo (LP, 2025)

=== Filmography ===
- Emicida: AmarElo - É tudo para ontem (documentary, 2020)
