= Anne Viriato =

Brazilian mixed martial arts (MMA) fighter

- Born: 19 April 1997 (age 27)
- Division: Flyweight
- Style: Mixed martial arts

Anne Viriato (born 19 April 1997) is the first trans woman to compete in Brazilian MMA (Mixed Martial Arts).

Viriato's wins came over male opponents in the flyweight division, competing in Mr Cage events. In 2018, she was awarded wins in Pitbull Fight Combat and Mr Cage Championship fights against men.

In June 2019, she was invited to give evidence in a public hearing to the Sports Committee in the Brazil Chamber of Deputies on the issue of transgender athletes.

== Mixed martial arts record ==
Professional record breakdown
2 matches	2 wins	0 losses
By decision	2	0

Res.	Record	Opponent	Method	Event	Date	Round	Time	Location	Notes
Win	2-0	Alcivan Perreira dos Santos	Decision (unanimous)	PFC - Pitbull Fight Combat	14 July 2018	3	5:00	Terra Santa, Para, Brazil	
Win	1-0	Railson Paixao	Decision (unanimous)	Mr. Cage 34	10 March 2018	3	5:00	Manaus, Amazonas, Brazil	
