= Elle Moxley =

American transgender rights activist

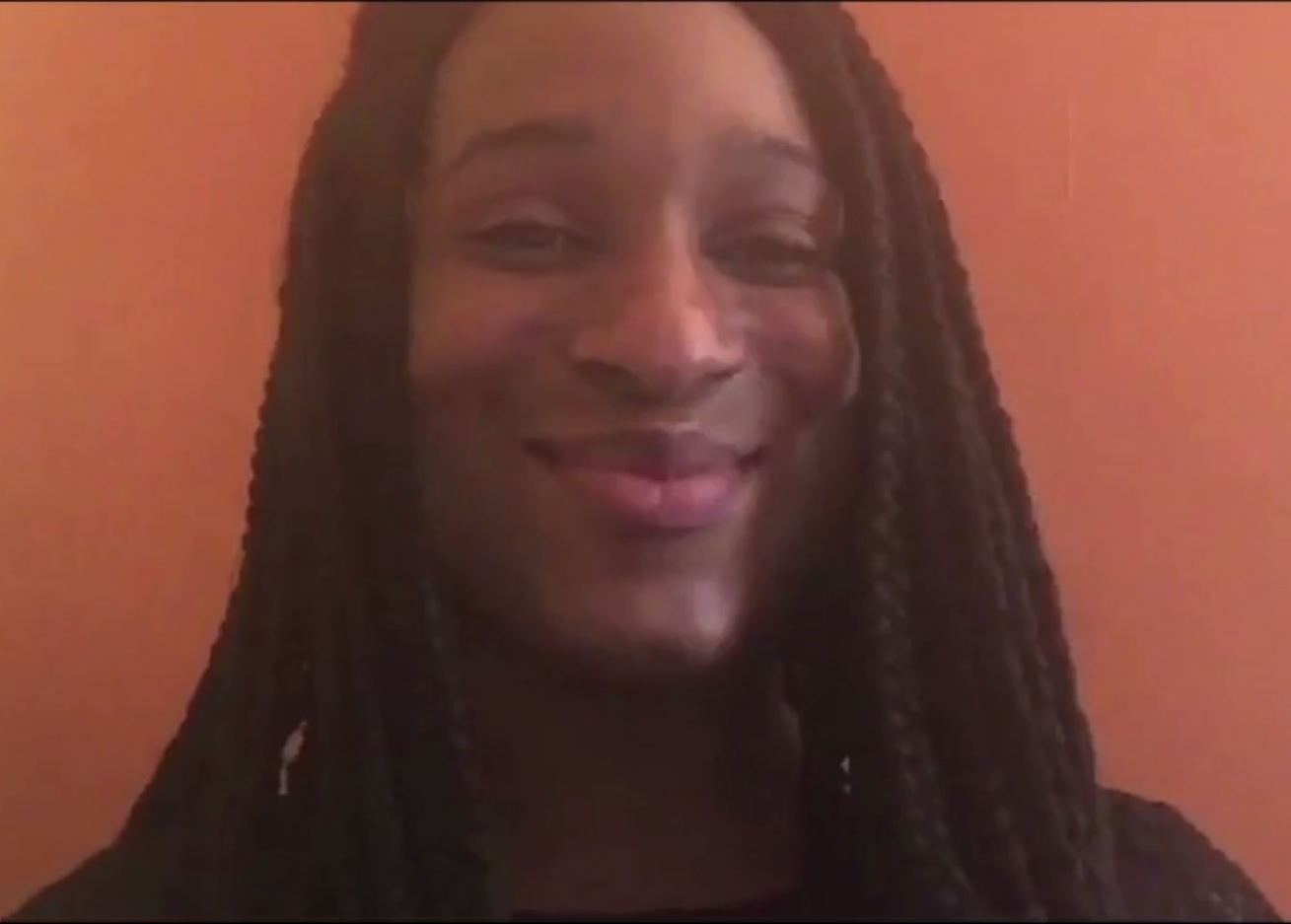
- Moxley in 2015
- Born: 1986 or 1987 (age 38–39); Columbus, Ohio, U.S.
- Education: Central State University
- Occupation: Organizer • speaker • writer
- Website: elle-moxley.com

Elle Moxley (formerly Elle Hearns, born 1986/1987) is an American transgender rights activist. She co-founded the Black Lives Matter Global Network, where she served as a strategic partner and organizing coordinator, and founded The Marsha P. Johnson Institute, where she served as the first executive director.

== Early life and education ==
Moxley was born in Columbus, Ohio. She grew up in a single-parent home with two sisters. She struggled being raised as a "little black boy who was existentially trapped in a boy’s body, but was definitely very much so female." Before discovering that she was transgender, she thought she was gay, and dealt with suicidal thoughts as she thought being gay was a sin.

Moxley was very interested in black power, and educated herself about Malcolm X and the civil rights movement. She became a youth organizer, and later attended Central State University, a historically black university in Wilberforce, Ohio.

== Career ==
In 2013, Moxley co-founded the Black Lives Matter Global Network. As a strategic partner and organizing coordinator, she helped develop policy for the network, including the 2016 policy platform "A Vision for Black Lives". She co-organized a National Day of Action in 2015 to bring attention to the black trans women who were killed that year.

In 2015, Moxley was one of the organizers of The Movement for Black Lives, a national three-day conference in Cleveland, Ohio.

Moxley founded The Marsha P. Johnson Institute, where she served as the first executive director. The mission of the institute, which launched in 2019, is to train and support black trans women and gender-nonconforming femmes. In October 2025, Chastity Bowick was announced as the new executive director of the institute.

Moxley has also served as a coordinator for GetEQUAL and as an ambassador for the Trans Women of Color Collective (TWOCC). Her writings have been featured in publications including the City University of New York Law Review and Ebony.

Moxley directed and featured in the 2022 short documentary film Black Beauty.

== Activism ==
In 2015, Moxley appeared on Democracy Now! and All Things Considered, discussing the shooting of Tamir Rice.

In February 2017, Moxley, along with other trans activists, criticized the pussyhat that had become a symbol of the 2017 Women's March, stating that the movement needs to be truly intersectional and consider the "anatomy of all people".

In August 2017, Moxley and fellow organizers at the Marsha P. Johnson Institute, along with other trans activists, spoke out against an episode of The Breakfast Club radio show where remarks were made about trans women. Comedian Lil Duval joked about killing a sex partner if she turned out to be transgender, and host Charlamagne Tha God, while noting that killing a trans person was a hate crime, stated that women not disclosing their trans status were "taking away a person's power of choice" and "should go to jail or something". Moxley and her colleagues circulated a petition calling for the program to be taken off the air.

On September 30, 2017, Moxley spoke at The March for Black Women in Washington, D.C. about the sisterhood between transgender and cisgender black women.

== Honors and recognition ==
- 2017 – Essence "Woke 100 Women"
- 2017 – The Root 100 Most Influential African Americans

== Personal life ==
Moxley moved to the Washington D.C. area in 2014. She now splits her time between D.C. and New York City.

Moxley changed her last name in 2021.
