= Rose Harlean =

French trans actress

- Born: 4 July 1992 (age 33); Montpellier, France

Rose Harlean (born 4 July 1992) is a French actress, filmmaker and LGBT rights activist.

== Career ==
In 2009, Rose Harlean began appearing in short movies and as an extra in feature movies such as Battle of the Year (2013) which was partially shot in her hometown of Montpellier.

Harlean ventured into directing while still studying film at the University of Montpellier. Her 2013 short movie Wild Horses was shot in Eastern Washington. She also directed and acted in the short movies Eternal Return (2017) and Dead Palms (2021) which were shot in English.

Harlean is a trans woman. As an activist for trans representation on screen, she welcomed Scarlett Johansson's choice not to appear as a trans man in the movie Rub&Tug in 2018. In 2020, she wrote an open letter in the magazine Têtu where she advocates for a better consideration of trans actors in French cinema. In a 2021 interview with Les Inrockuptibles, she describes herself as hopeful when it comes to future representations.

In 2021, she voiced the character of Çağla in the French version of the Netflix movie Paper Lives.
