= Philippine Dhanis =

Belgian politician and parliamentary assistant (1967–2022)

- Born: 5 August 1967; Lobbes, Belgium
- Died: 20 September 2022 (aged 55); Verlaine, Belgium
- Occupations: Politician; Parliamentary assistant

Philippine Dhanis (8 May 1967 – 20 September 2022) was a Belgian parliamentary assistant and politician of the Reformist Movement (MR). A transgender woman, she publicized her transition in 2017 and was a candidate in the 2019 Belgian federal election in Hainaut Province, without success.

== Biography ==
Dhanis joined the Reformist Movement in 2007. The following year, she became secretary of the party's local office in Thuin, then president. She then became assistant to Parliament of Wallonia member Yves Binon and joined the cabinet of Federal Minister for Budget and Administrative Simplification Olivier Chastel.

Dhanis began her transition in 2016, aged 49. With the agreement of her three children, she came out publicly in 2017. Thanks to a change of transgender law in Belgium, her transition process was made easier. She became parliamentary assistant to Jean-Jacques Flahaux, who helped write the law.

In 2018, Dhanis published her autobiography, Je suis transsexuelle et j'en fais pas une maladie, a testimony to the first two years of her transition. She expressed her ambition to become the first transgender member of the Chamber of Representatives, as Petra De Sutter was already a member of the Senate. She organized several conferences depicting her journey.

In 2019, Dhanis was an MR candidate for the Chamber of Representatives in Hainaut Province. On a party list led by Denis Ducarme, she placed 15th out of 18 candidates. During her campaign, she was the victim of several transphobic attacks. That same year, she was the subject of a documentary by a journalism student at the Université catholique de Lille, which won multiple jury awards. She then left the political world and became a truck driver.

Philippine Dhanis died in Verlaine on 20 September 2022, at the age of 55.

== Publication ==
- Je suis transsexuelle et j'en fais pas une maladie (2018)
