= Joanne Rushton =

English soldier

Joanne Louise Wingate (born 1961) is the first publicly known transsexual-soldier to transition, change sex and continue to serve in the post cold-war British Army.

Joanne Louise Wingate, a Warrant Officer Class 1, started her transition in August 1996 and eventually had her gender reassignment at the end of January 2000. Only a few months after her SRS (Sex reassignment surgery male-to-female) the Army terminated her service in May 2003, effectively firing her. This was in total disregard to their own "new guidelines/instruction AGAI 76" on the issue of "transition within the Army" issued especially to protect people like her. As Joanne Wingate served in the Falklands War, Germany, Gulf War, Kosovo, Bosnia, and Northern Ireland with the Royal Electrical and Mechanical Engineers and was also part of the army boxing team, Army and British Ski Bike Team.

She was the first person in the service, and it is believed serving Soldier in any Country, to openly change gender and also take the Ministry of Defence to an employment tribunal for discrimination in 2003. Given that the Gender Recognition Act was first signed into law in 2004, she was legally (under old legal British precedents) considered male, and subsequently lost her case.

In 2003 an article about her with headline "Transsexual Loses Case" and a report about Petra Henderson, Royal Signals, with Title "Sex-Swap Soldier Speaks out" appeared on page three of the British Army's daily newspaper ("Sixth Sense" 20 November 2003).
