= Maxim Magnus =

Belgian fashion model

- Occupation: Fashion model
- Modeling information
- Height: 176 cm (5 ft 9 in)
- Hair color: Brown
- Eye color: Brown
- Agency: Brave Model Management (Milan)

Maxim Magnus is a Belgian model and activist.

== Career ==
Magnus began modeling while studying fashion communications in London.

She has since walked for many of some of the world's most major brands, including Miu Miu, Gucci, and Schiaparelli.

== Personal life ==
Magnus is transgender, having first discovered her identity at the age of 14. She has been repeatedly outspoken about her experience as a trans woman.

As of 2019, she is dating fellow model Finn Buchanan, and is based in London.
