= Alain Wegmann =

Swiss computer scientist

Alain Wegmann (born 1958) was a Swiss computer scientist, professor of Systemic Modeling at the École Polytechnique Fédérale de Lausanne (EPFL), and Information Technology and Services consultant, known for the development of the Systemic Enterprise Architecture Methodology (SEAM).

== Biography ==
Wegmann received his EE (Engineer's degree) degree at École Polytechnique Fédérale de Lausanne (EPFL) in 1981, and his Ph.D. in office automation at Paris VI University in France in 1984.

In 1984 Wegmann started his career at Logitech in Romanel, Switzerland, where he kept working for 14 years in Switzerland, Taiwan and the US. At Logitech he moved up from software developer, IS manager, manufacturing engineering to vice president engineering and marketing director. In 1996 he returned to his alma mater, where he became professor Systemic Modeling.

Wegmann has been conference program member of the Requirement Engineering Conference in 2006, steering committee member of the EDOC Conference in 2009 and conference program member of UML Conference in 2009. He is member of the Association for Computing Machinery (ACM), Institute of Electrical and Electronics Engineers (IEEE) and the engineering academy (SATW) of the Swiss Academy of Arts and Sciences.

Wegmann died on December 1, 2022.

== Work ==
Wegmann's research interests and expertise were in the fields of "strategic thinking, marketing, enterprise architecture, requirements engineering, service-oriented architecture".

== Publications ==
Wegmann published a series of articles starting in the new millennium A selection.

- 2001. "Conceptual modeling of complex systems using an RM-ODP based Ontology" with Andrey Naumenko, in : Enterprise Distributed Object Computing Conference, 2001. EDOC '01. Proceedings. Fifth IEEE International. p. 200-211
- 2003. "On the systemic enterprise architecture methodology (SEAM)". Published at the International Conference on Enterprise Information Systems 2003 (ICEIS 2003).
- 2004. "Enterprise Architecture: What Aspects is Current Research Targeting?". With Kerstin Langenberg. Laboratory of Systemic Modeling, at infoscience.epfl.ch
- 2005. "Where do Goals Come from: the Underlying Principles of Goal-Oriented". With Gil Regev. in: Proceedings 13th IEEE International Conference on Requirements Engineering (RE’05), Paris, France, 2005 . p. 353-362
- 2007. "Teaching Enterprise and Service-Oriented Architecture in Practice". Wegmann et al., in: Journal of Enterprise Architecture, 4(3):15 - 24, 2007.
- 2008. "Using Declarative Specifications in Business Process Design". With I. Rychkova and G. Regev, in: International Journal of Computer Science & Applications, V(IIIb): p. 45-68
- 2008 "Specifying Services for ITIL Service Management". A. Wegmann, et al. in: The International Workshop on Service-Oriented Computing Consequences for Engineering Requirements (SOCCER'08) in the 16th IEEE International Requirements Engineering Conference, 2008.
- 2008. ""Augmenting the Zachman Enterprise Architecture Framework with a Systemic Conceptualization". Wegmann et al. Presented at the 12th IEEE International EDOC Conference (EDOC 2008), München, Germany, 15–19 September 2008.
