= Viviany Beleboni =

Brazilian actress and model (born 1987/1988)

- Born: 1987 or 1988 (age 38–39); Torres, Rio Grande do Sul, Brazil
- Occupations: Actress; Model

Viviany Beleboni (born 1987 or 1988) is a Brazilian actress and model. She became internationally known after reenacting the crucifixion of Jesus Christ at the 19th São Paulo LGBTQ Pride Parade in 2015. She wore a flower crown, suspended by her wrists on a cross, under a sign that read "Basta de homofobia" (lit. 'enough of homophobia').

In 2016, also at the São Paulo LGBTQ Pride Parade, she dressed up as Lady Justice and carried a Bible and a banner that read "bancada evangélica: retrocesso" (lit. 'evangelical caucus: regression'). In 2017, she participated in the Pride Parade dressed in military attire, expressing criticism of the persecution of LGBTQ people in Chechnya, religious fundamentalism, and the exclusion of LGBTQ people from military service.

== Biography ==
Viviany Beleboni was born in the city of Torres, Rio Grande do Sul. Since childhood, Viviany suffered verbal, physical, and psychological abuse at school (from classmates) and at home (from her sister) for not conforming to gender stereotypes. During her adolescence, she imitated the singer Junior Lima in local shows and also worked as a teen model.

At 17, when she came out as a gay man, she was kicked out of her house by her sister. She resorted to prostitution to survive.

In Porto Alegre, she began performing as a drag queen and, influenced by trans friends, started body modifications. Viviany mentions that, unlike many trans people who first have clarity about their gender identity before altering their bodies, she underwent physical changes before fully understanding her identity, referring to herself as a "travesti by accident."

== Crucifixion of Jesus ==
On 7 June 2015, after staging the crucifixion of Jesus Christ, Viviany Beleboni faced religious criticism, death threats, and transphobic attacks. She suffered a knife attack as a result of the performance and stated to the press:

He said that I am not of God, that I am a demon, and that I would have to pay for what I did.

That same year, she filed a lawsuit for moral damages against Marco Feliciano, which resulted in public statements condemning her participation in the Pride Parade.

In 2016, when she dressed up as Lady Justice with a Bible, she was reported by an evangelical organization and summoned to testify on charges of desecrating religious symbols. That same year, Viviany Beleboni said she was beaten by five men in downtown São Paulo and did not file a police report for fear of being humiliated by the police and did not go to a hospital for fear of being mistreated.

To go there only to be mistreated? To have my name ignored? Travestis have no rights whatsoever. I want to forget all of this.

— Viviany Beleboni

Despite the discontent of some religious figures, Father Júlio Lancellotti and Pastor José Barbosa Júnior washed Viviany's feet during the Walk in Memory of Laura Vermont, a trans woman murdered in 2015.

In August 2020, Sikêra Júnior was initially ordered to pay 30,000 reais to the model for calling her a "disgraceful race," when he presented an image of her in 2015 as Jesus crucified on his program. In November, the 16th Civil Court of São Paulo rejected one of the model's three lawsuits against Sikêra and, instead, Viviany was ordered to pay a 10% fine, later increased to 15% by the 5th Chamber of Private Law of São Paulo, which upheld the decision after the model's appeal.
