= Tania Navarro Amo =

Spanish writer, LGBTQ activist (born 1956)

- Born: January 6, 1956 (age 70); Barcelona, Spain
- Occupations: Writer, LGBT rights activist, vedette performer

Tania Navarro Amo (born 6 January 1956) is a Spanish writer, and LGBT rights activist. She was a former vedette performer.

== Life and career ==
Tania Navarro Amo was born on 6 January 1956 in Barcelona, Spain, during the dictatorship of Francisco Franco and 22 years before the legalization/decriminalization of queerness in Spain. She grew up in a profoundly conservative and transphobic environment, and under a regime that persecuted sexual and gender non-conformities.

In 1965 his mother decided to enter her into a reformatory, convinced by her neighbors. After several escapes, and still under the Franco regime, Tania was forced into prostitution while still a minor, which led to her being imprisoned. During her time in prison, she was a victim of a multitude of abuse, humiliation, and aggression by prison officials because of her identity, as well as a victim of multiple sexual assaults by both prison officials and other inmates.

After her release from prison, she worked as a vedette in various theaters in Madrid and Barcelona, debuting first as a ballet dancer in the Hotel El Palace in Barcelona and she later put on shows that challenged prevailing sexual morality. She was also one of the trans women present in the 1977 Barcelona gay pride demonstration, the first LGBT Pride demonstration in the history of Spain.

On 20 August 2021 she published her autobiography, La infancia de una transexual en la dictadura, A través de los ojos de mi madre, in which she narrates the experiences of her life, as well as the abuses she suffered for being a trans woman during the Franco regime.

== Works ==
- Navarro Amo, Tania (2021). La infancia de una transexual en la dictadura [The Childhood of a Transsexual in the Dictatorship] (in Spanish). Universo de Letras. ISBN 978-8418854033.
- Navarro Amo, Tania (2023). A través de los ojos de mi madre [Through My Mother's Eyes] (in Spanish). Universo de Letras. ISBN 9788419776051.
