= Verlaine =

Municipality in Liège Province, Wallonia, Belgium

Verlaine Verlinne (Walloon)
- Municipality
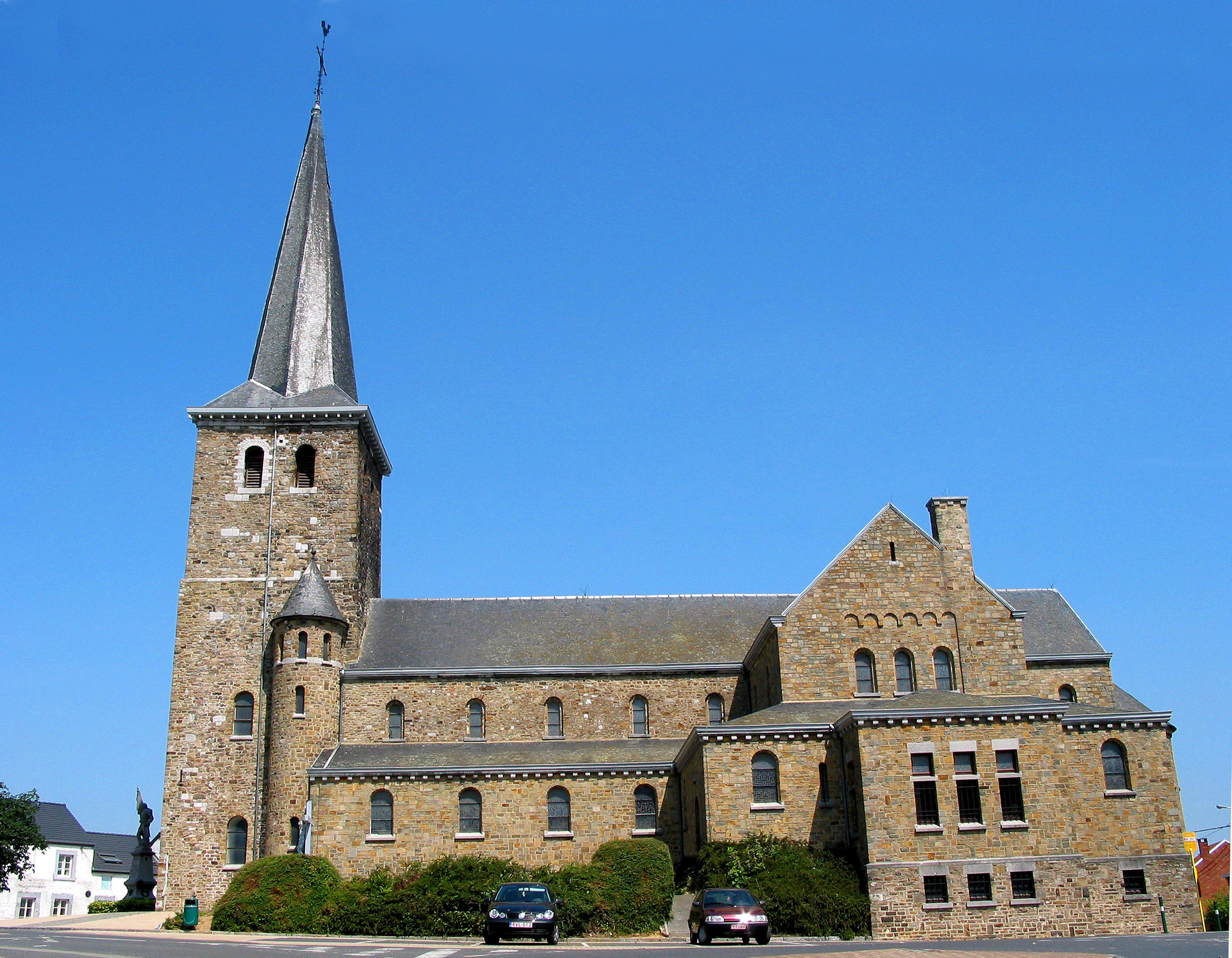

- Location of Verlaine in the province of Liège
- Interactive map of Verlaine
- Location in Belgium
- Coordinates: 50°36′N 05°19′E
- Country: Belgium
- Community: French Community
- Region: Wallonia
- Province: Liège
- Arrondissement: Huy

Government
  - Mayor: Hubert Jonet (MR)
  - Governing party: I.C.V

Area
  - Total: 24.4 km^{2} (9.4 sq mi)

Population (2018-01-01)
  - Total: 4,177
  - Density: 171/km^{2} (443/sq mi)
- Postal codes: 4537
- NIS code: 61063
- Area codes: 04
- Website: www.verlaine.be

Verlaine (French pronunciation: [vɛʁlɛn]; Walloon: Verlinne) is a municipality of Wallonia located in the province of Liège, Belgium.

On January 1, 2006, Verlaine had a total population of 3,507. The total area is 24.21 km^{2} which gives a population density of 145 inhabitants per km^{2}.

The municipality consists of the following districts: Bodegnée, Chapon-Seraing, Seraing-le-Château and Verlaine.

== See also ==
- List of protected heritage sites in Verlaine
