= Yukichi (singer) =

- Born: August 18, 1984 (age 42); Osaka, Japan
- Years active: 2010-present
- Formerly of: SECRET GUYZ

Yukichi (諭吉) (born 18 August 1984 in Osaka) is a Japanese singer, actor and TV personality who works for the Yoshimoto Kogyo entertainment agency. He is Yoshimoto's first transgender male entertainer.

He was formerly a member of the all-female-to-male music group SECRET GUYZ, and a finalist for the auditions of the mixed-gender idol group Yoshimotozaka 46. His current aim with his work is to increase public awareness and acceptance of the LGBTQ community.

== Career ==
Yukichi debuted in the entertainment industry in 2010.

His first written book, "I am the Eldest Daughter", detailing his upbringing and early life was released on 23 February 2010.

In 2012, he formed SECRET GUYZ with fellow transgender male entertainers Yoshihara Shute and Ideka Taiki, and the group had their CD debut the following year. SECRET GUYZ continued activity until their disbandment on 12 February 2018.

As a member of SECRET GUYZ, Yukichi performed at Tokyo Rainbow Pride 2016.

In August 2018, he participated in the auditions for Yoshimotozaka46, where he advanced to the finals.

In October 2018, he served as a host at the GRAMMY TOKYO 6th anniversary Halloween party.

In December 2018, he opened a bar named YUKICHIBAR in Shinjuku, where he has since worked as the manager.

== Performances ==
=== Stage productions ===
- Double Booking (Feb 2010, Jimbocho Kagetsu)
- Otoko Oiran (Mar/May 2014, Sasazuka Factory and others)
- Stage: Pankisu! 3D (August 2015, Shinjuku Alta Studio)
- Geigeki + Talk: Reading ‘Tokyo’ (February 2016, Tokyo Metropolitan Art Theatre)

=== Television series ===
- Weak Man, a series of mini-dramas starring SECRET GUYZ (8 Dec 2014 - 9 Mar 2015, BS11).

=== Films ===
- Yadori (2019)

=== Variety shows ===
- Ebisu Kecakpu (8 Apr-13 - 9 Sep-13, TOKYO MX), as part of SECRET GUYZ.

=== Music videos ===
- WAZZ UP “Be My Love” (March 2013)
