= Janine Wegman =

Dutch Hammond-organist and artist

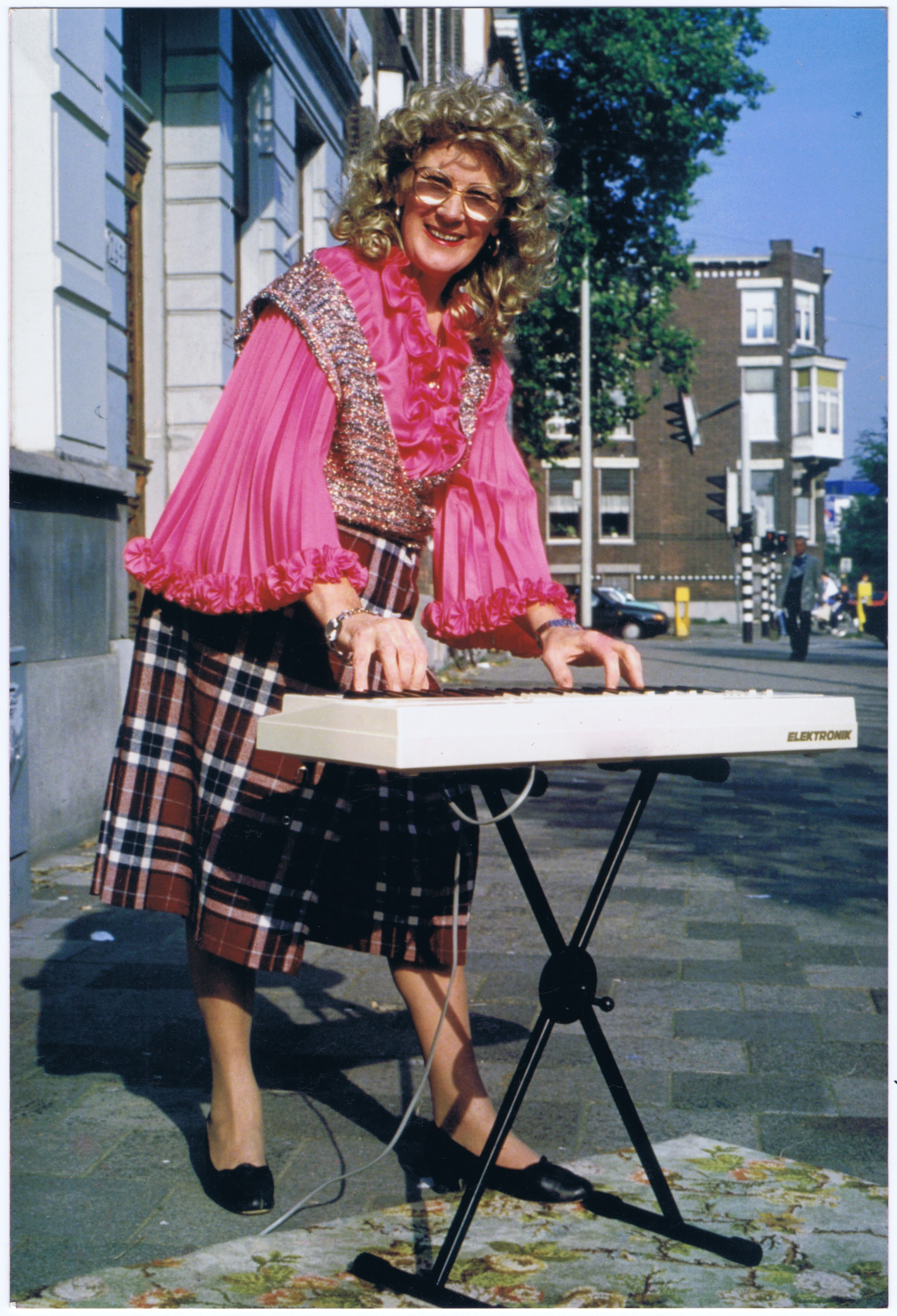
Janine Wegman on her keyboard in front of her home on the Bergweg in Rotterdam

Janine Wegman (25 September 1925 – 22 February 2007) was a Dutch Hammond-organist and artist based in Rotterdam. She was one of the first Dutch people to be openly transgender.

== Career ==
Wegman started her career as the magician ‘Rinus’, and later had success with her first wife with the act 'Marinio en Janine', and appeared on national television in 1949. She worked at the volunteer fire service. Later in life, she became a Hammond-organist. She regularly performed in Rotterdam, and in the early 1970s, she played on Wednesday and Saturday afternoon on the Schouwburgplein.

== Personal life ==
Wegman was born in Rotterdam. She has been married twice and had two children. She chose the name Janine after the first name of her first wife. In 1978, she put a personal ad in the newspaper with the text 'Which man or woman will take a woman with a small mistake on a holiday for free?' Jan van Vriesland responded and took her on her first foreign trip to Spain. The couple married during this trip in Barcelona, but this marriage was not officially recognized in the Netherlands. In 1992, she appeared in the television program Paradijsvogels.

== Transgender-emancipation ==
Wegman was born as an androgynous person, and felt like a woman since 1960. Janine was known as the first transsexual person in Rotterdam to present in public as a woman in the late 1950s. Together with trans pioneers such as Aaïcha Bergamin, she was one of the first people in the Netherlands to openly manifest herself as transsexual. She was being treated by Dr Otto de Vaal and received hormone tablets.

Since 1959, there was a General Police Regulation in Rotterdam in which Article 56, “Walking in disguise or masked”, was used to prevent transvestism. Section 1 read: "It is forbidden to show oneself on the road in the clothing of the sex to which one does not belong." Wegman was regularly arrested by the police for walking down the street in women's clothing. She had a run-in with the police after hitting a police officer in the face in the Benthuizerstraat, after which six police officers beat her up until she bled.

She had to try for several years before she could become a member of the COC, a Dutch organisation for LGBT people.

In 1978, Wegman managed to change the name in her passport to Johanna Maria Wegman through a lawsuit. In an attempt to get the V for Female in her passport, she showed her breasts several times at City Hall. After the first action in 1978, a civil registry officer scratched the V for Female in her passport, but this was not a legally valid change. After her second action in 1995, the registry office stated that there were no valid documents of gender reassignment, which was a prerequisite for gender reassignment on ID cards between 1985 and 2014. In 1996, after being castrated, and again appearing bare-chested at the counter and threatening with suicide, Janine Wegman was finally allowed to register as a woman at the registry office.
