= Jennifer Peace (military officer) =

American military officer

Personal details
- Children: 3

Military service
- Branch/service: United States Army
- Years of service: 2005–2025
- Rank: Captain

Jennifer Peace is an American retired military officer. She was outed as a trans woman in 2015, while serving in the United States Army.

== Career ==
Peace joined the United States Army when she was nineteen years old.

served as an intelligence officer in the United States Army, serving deployments to Iraq, Afghanistan, and South Korea. In 2009, she was named Noncommissioned Officer of the year. In 2013, she graduated from the Military Intelligence Career Course with distinguished honors. In 2014, she was stationed at Fort Lewis, Washington. Shortly thereafter, she was assigned to a Stryker brigade combat team serving in Fort Irwin, California, Malaysia, and in northern Japan.

She serves on the board of SPARTA, a nonprofit organization that advocates for transgender people in the military. Peace was one of the subjects of the 2018 documentary film TransMilitary. In 2017, she was stationed at Joint Base Lewis-McChord.

== Personal life ==
Peace is a trans woman and began transitioning in 2014, while serving in the army. She was outed in 2015.

She lived in Washington state. Peace is married and has three children.

== Filmography ==
Year	Title	Role	Notes
2018	TransMilitary	Herself	Documentary film
