= Esdras Parra =

Venezuelan writer, poet and editor

- Born: 13 July 1929; Santa Cruz de Mora, Venezuela
- Died: 18 November 2004 (aged 75); Caracas, Venezuela
- Occupations: Writer and poet

Esdras Parra (13 July 1929 in Santa Cruz de Mora, Venezuela – 18 November 2004 in Caracas, Venezuela) was a Venezuelan writer, poet, and trans woman. She was a founding editor of the literary magazine Imagen.

== Biography ==
Parra began her career writing short stories and later wrote poetry and drew. Her poetry has been translated into English by Jamie Berrout. Parra transitioned to a woman in London in the early seventies. Although she claimed to have been born in 1937, close friends revealed after her death that she had been born in 1929.

In London, she made friends with many other influential Latin American writers, including Guillermo Cabrera Infante and José Napoleón Oropeza. According to Oropeza, her friendship with Cabrera did not last long after Cabrera spread widespread rumors that Parra had transitioned as a woman after falling in love with a lesbian who would not accept her affections. This rumor was strongly denied by Parras, but would end up inspiring Mario Vargas Llosa's 2008 play, Al pie del Támesis.

Parra returned to Venezuela in the late seventies. Due to her transition, she was fired from her job at the Revista Nacional de Cultura and rejected by her family and colleagues. She did not publish a book after that until 1995, when she published Este suelo secreto, a poetry and story collection where she discussed living as a trans woman. Her final book, Aún no, was not published until after her death in 2004.

Almost 20 years after her death, her close friend and fellow poet José Napoleón Oropeza was able to have two collections of her unreleased poetry published with Fundación La Poeteca in 2021. Oropeza inherited several other pieces of her unpublished work, including over 300 drawings and a book on art criticism.

Parra died in 2004 from throat cancer.

== Works ==
=== Books ===
- El insurgente (1967)
- Por el norte el mar de las Antillas (1968)
- Juego limpio (1968)

=== Poetry and collections ===
- Este suelo secreto (Monte Ávila Editores) (1995)
- Antigüedad del frío (2001)
- Aún no (2004)
- Lo que trae el relámpago (Published by Fundación La Poeteca in 2021; A complication of two unpublished poetry collections, Cada noche su camino, written 1996-1997, and El extremado amor, written 2002-2003)

== Awards and nominations ==
- Poetry Prize of the II Biennial de Literatura Mariano Picón Salas in Mérida, Venezuela (1993) for Este suelo secreto (1995)
