= Chen Lili (model) =

Chinese singer, model, and actress

Chen Lili 陈莉莉 陳莉莉
- Born: 1980 (age 44–45)
- Occupation(s): Singer, model, actress
- Instrument: Vocals

Chen Lili (or Lili Chen, simplified Chinese: 陈莉莉; traditional Chinese: 陳莉莉; pinyin: Chén Lìlì; born February 1980) is a transgender singer, model, and actress from the People's Republic of China. She became widely known in 2004 when she competed and attempted to compete in beauty pageants as a woman.

She was born into a peasant family at Yilong County, Nanchong City of Sichuan Province. She received sex reassignment surgery in Qingdao in November 2003. On February 11, 2004, she was issued an ID card establishing her female identity by the Public Security Bureau of Nanchong.

Chen attempted to compete in the Miss Universe contest in early 2004. Although the Miss Universe China committee initially announced, on February 23, that she would be allowed to participate, on February 25, they retracted their original decision, stating that she would not be allowed to participate because she was not a "natural female." Despite being barred from the competition, Chen was nonetheless given the opportunity to perform at the event. It is believed that Lili is the first transsexual woman to attempt to compete in the Miss Universe contest.

In late 2004, Chen competed in China's first Miss Artificial Beauty pageant. She finished as second runner up.

In 2005, she appeared in the motion picture The Secret (simplified Chinese: 隐私; traditional Chinese: 隱私; pinyin: yǐnsī).

== Notes ==
Newspaper sources are not clear whether Chen attempted to enter and was rejected by the Miss World pageant or the Miss Universe pageant.

== See also ==
- Trans woman
