= Laila Ireland =

American non-commissioned military officer

Personal details
- Born: Hawaii, U.S.
- Spouse: Logan Ireland
- Occupation: activist medic

Military service
- Branch/service: United States Army
- Years of service: 2003–2015
- Rank: Corporal

Laila Ireland (née Villanueva) is an American LGBTQ activist and retired United States Army medic. She was featured in the 2018 documentary film TransMilitary.

== Early life and family ==
Ireland was born into a military family in Hawaii. She is from Kapolei, Hawaii, and is of Native Hawaiian, Puerto Rican, and Chamorro descent. Her father, grandfather, and great-grandfather are all veterans.

== Career ==
Ireland enlisted in the United States Army in 2003 as a human intelligence collector. She returned to the United States from her first deployment in 2005 and trained as a health care management and administration technician. She served in the Army for twelve years, completing two deployments to Iraq. Her last post was at Tripler Army Medical Center in Hawaii. She was honorably discharged and medically retired from the Army in 2015, having started her gender transition while still serving in uniform. At that time, the U.S. Department of Defense classified transgender identity as a disqualifying medical condition under its medical fitness standards, listing "psychosexual conditions", including "transsexualism", as grounds for administrative separation. Ireland's retirement was the last publicly-known discharge under this policy. Villanueva had served in the Army for over a decade and began her gender transition while still in uniform. Despite receiving support from her chain of command, she was ultimately separated under the medical regulations in place at the time.

In 2012, Ireland began working with SPARTA and Outserve Trans, two nonprofit organizations that support transgender military personnel and recruits, leading inclusivity trainings. In 2025, Ireland participated in Lambda Legal's "All Rise" campaign. In 2018, she served as SPARTA's membershop director. Ireland is also on the board for the transgender advocacy nonprofit organization Point of Pride.

== Personal life ==
Ireland is a trans woman. She married Logan Ireland, a trans man and retired US Air Force master sergeant, in 2016. In 2015, Ireland and her then-fiancé were featured in the Emmy-nominated New York Times documentary short film Transgender, at War and in Love. In 2018, they were featured in the documentary film TransMilitary.

In 2017, she was named Military Spouse of the Year on Peterson Air Force Base in Colorado.

== Filmography ==
Year	Title	Role	Notes
2015	Transgender, at War and in Love	Herself	Documentary film
2018	TransMilitary	Herself	Documentary film
