= Chastity Bowick =

American social justice activist (born 1985)

- An image and logo of Chastity's Consulting & Talent Group (CCTG).
- Born: 1985 (age 40–41); Rochester, New York
- Education: Clark University
- Occupations: Transgender Health Advocate & Social Justice Activist
- Employer(s): Marsha P. Johnson Institute; Massachusetts General Hospital CARE Program; Chastity Bowick Consulting & Talent Group
- Known for: Transgender activism
- Website: Official website

Chastity Bowick (born 1985) is an American transgender health advocate and social justice activist based in Massachusetts. She is known for her work supporting low-income and homeless transgender individuals as the executive director of the Marsha P. Johnson Institute and former executive director of the Transgender Emergency Fund of Massachusetts. Bowick has also founded a consulting firm, where she provides training to organizations on working with transgender and non-binary communities. Bowick is a Black transgender woman who uses she/her pronouns.

== Early life ==
Born and raised in Rochester, New York, Bowick began her transition at 17 after moving to Boston, Massachusetts to seek a safer environment for her gender affirmation process. She has spoken about her early challenges, including experiencing homelessness, domestic violence, and engaging in survival sex work.

== Career and activism ==
From 2015 to 2023, Bowick led the Transgender Emergency Fund of Massachusetts, a nonprofit organization with the mission of providing support services to low-income and homeless transgender individuals, including housing and healthcare assistance. During the COVID-19 pandemic, she started a nutritional program in collaboration with the American Heart Association and About Fresh to deliver produce boxes to transgender individuals across the state. Bowick has also been heavily involved in organizing events commemorating Transgender Day of Remembrance (TDOR), such as spearheading the City of Boston's 25th Annual TDOR Commemoration in November 2024.

In January 2023, Bowick founded Chastity's Consulting & Talent Group, LLC (CCTG), which provides guidance to organizations on supporting transgender communities. CCTG aims to promote equal protections and improve quality of life for these communities. Bowick also currently serves as the Community Engagement Director at Massachusetts General Hospital's CARE Research Center.

In October 2025, Bowick was announced as the new executive director of the Marsha P. Johnson Institute, succeeding Elle Moxley.

== Honors and awards ==
Bowick has received a number of awards for her contributions to advocacy and health support for the transgender community, including:

- TDOV Activist and Visibility Award from the Massachusetts Commission on LGBTQ Youth (2024)
- Massachusetts LGBTQ+ Leader from MassLive (2023)
- LGBTQIA+ Champion Award from the AdClub Equity Project (2022)
- Lavender Rhino Award by The History Project (2020)
- Advancing Equity Award from the Massachusetts Commission on LGBTQ Youth (2018)

== See also ==
- LGBT rights in Massachusetts
- Transgender rights movement
- Same-sex marriage in Massachusetts
- List of LGBT rights organizations
