= Chahal v United Kingdom =

1996 judgment of the European Court of Human Rights

Chahal v United Kingdom (23 EHRR 413) was a 1996 judgment of the European Court of Human Rights which applied Article 3 of the European Convention on Human Rights, prohibiting the deportation of Sikh separatist Mr Chahal to India because of the risk of violations of Article 3, in the form of torture or inhuman or degrading treatment or punishment.

== Case ==
Living in the United Kingdom since the early 1970s, Chahal was detained pending deportation to India where it was claimed he would face torture. Although by the 1990s a well-established system of tribunals existed to provide scrutiny of the government over immigration concerns, issues concerning national security, whereby the British Home Secretary issued a certificate stating that an individual was non-conductive to the public good, were exempt from this; these appeals were replaced by a paper review by three retired judges over lunch in the House of Lords. According to British civil liberties activist Shami Chakrabarti, Chahal was detained for six years without adequate legal scrutiny.

== Judgement ==
The Court emphasised the fundamental nature of Article 3 in holding that the prohibition is made in "absolute terms ... irrespective of the victim's conduct". The judgement builds on the landmark Soering v United Kingdom (1989), and was considered an example of the British government losing a seminal legal case in the European Court of Human Rights.

The Court also found "a violation of article 5 § 4 of the Convention (which guarantees a right of judicial review of the lawfulness of detention), so far as the domestic courts were not provided with information relating to national security and were thus unable to review whether the decision to detain the applicant was justified; the "procedural short-comings" of the United Kingdom's special advisory panel in security cases meant that it could not be considered to be a "court" for the purposes of article 5 § 4."
