= Margaret Stumpp =

American executive

Margaret Stumpp (born 1952) is a senior vice president at Prudential Financial, Inc. She is the first openly transsexual person out of over 60,000 employees in the firm.

In February 2002, Stumpp transitioned at age 49 from male to female while simultaneously maintaining her position at Prudential Financial, where she functioned as Chief Investment Officer for Quantitative Management Associates - a wholly owned investment management subsidiary of Prudential.

In addition to remaining in investment management, she also continued to be actively engaged in investment research and her work has appeared in a number of academic journals. These include the Financial Analyst's Journal, The Journal of Portfolio Management and the Journal of Investment Management. Margaret received a BA in Economics from Boston University and Ph.D. in Economics from Brown University.

Adam Geller of the Associated Press chronicled her transition in an award-winning article entitled Call Me Maggie. In addition to maintaining her professional career after changing genders she also made numerous presentations to corporate managers across the U.S., aimed at increasing the awareness and acceptance of transgender people within the workplace.
