= Logan Ireland =

American military officer

- Ireland in 2022

Personal details
- Spouse: Laila Villanueva

Military service
- Branch/service: United States Air Force
- Years of service: 2010–2025
- Rank: Master sergeant
- Unit: Air Force Office of Special Investigations
- Battles/wars: Operation Enduring Freedom; Operation Freedom's Sentinel; Operation Odyssey Dawn

Logan Ireland is an American retired non-commissioned military officer who was a special agent of the Air Force Office of Special Investigations. A trans man, he starred in the 2018 documentary TransMilitary. Ireland was fired from the United States Air Force in 2025 following President Donald Trump's Executive Order 14183, which banned transgender people from military service.

== Early life and education ==
Ireland grew up in Flower Mound, Texas. He is of Irish and Scottish descent.

He has a bachelor's degree in sociology and master's degree in military studies with a dual concentration in strategic leadership and joint warfare. He graduated from the United States Army Air Assault School.

== Career ==
Ireland enlisted in the United States Air Force in 2010. He was eventually promoted to the rank of master sergeant. He worked as a special agent of the Air Force Office of Special Investigations at Joint Base Pearl Harbor–Hickam in Hawaii, where he led over a dozen special agents throughout sixteen countries in conducting counterintelligence operations. Ireland was deployed multiple times to Afghanistan, Qatar, the United Arab Emirates, and South Korea in support of Operation Odyssey Dawn, Operation Enduring Freedom, and Operation Freedom's Sentinel.

Ireland is a mentor with the Future Warriors program for SPARTA Pride, a nonprofit organization that fights for the rights of transgender military personnel and recruits.

=== Forced retirement ===
In 2025, Ireland was fired from the military following President Donald Trump's Executive Order 14183 that banned transgender people from serving in the United States Armed Forces. He was then denied his military retirement benefits as the Temporary Early Retirement Authority, under acting Assistant Secretary of the Air Force Brian Scarlett, denied all requests for personnel with fifteen to eighteen years of service.

His retirement ceremony took place aboard the USS Missouri (BB-63) in Hawaii in May 2026.

== Personal life ==
Ireland is married to Laila Ireland (née Villanueva), a trans woman and retired US Army combat medic. They were featured in the 2018 documentary film TransMilitary.

== Filmography ==
Year	Title	Role	Notes	Ref
2015	Transgender, at War and in Love	Himself	Documentary film	
2018	TransMilitary	Himself	Documentary film	
