= M v Home Office =

UK constitutional law case

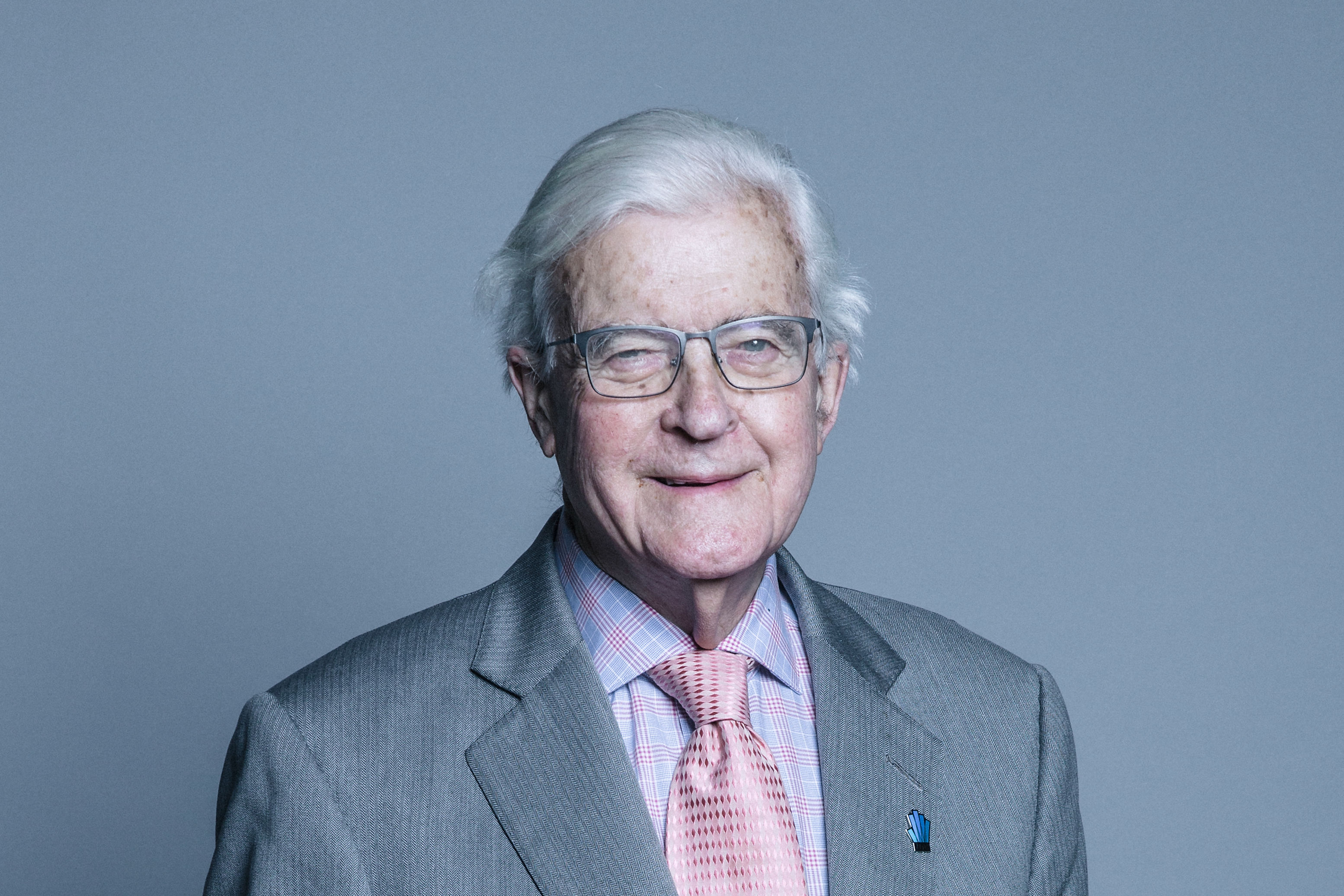
- Kenneth Baker, the Home Secretary at the time.
- Court: House of Lords
- Citations: [1993] UKHL 5, [1994] 1 AC 377

Keywords
- Rule of law

M v Home Office [1993] UKHL 5 is a UK constitutional law case concerning the rule of law.

== Facts ==
M was a teacher from Zaire whose application for refugee status the Home Office had refused on the basis of incomplete information about M's subjection to torture. When the Home Office was about to put M on a flight bound for Kinshasa, M's solicitor made an emergency application to the High Court for judicial review of the deportation decision: the judge, Mr Justice Garland, adjourned the hearing of the application to another time during normal working hours when it could be dealt with properly. The judge did so on the understanding that the Home Office had given an undertaking, which is a promise made to the court by a party to a case and which the court can enforce, that M would not be deported until this fuller hearing had taken place.

The Home Office, not thinking that an undertaking had been given, thereafter failed to intercept M during a layover in Paris. M's solicitor subsequently sought and received from Mr Justice Garland an order which required the Home Secretary, Kenneth Baker, to retrieve M from Kinshasa. Believing that the court's coercive powers, which can be exercised to compel a person to do something or otherwise be found in contempt of court, could not be exercised against a Minister of the Crown, the Home Office, through the British Embassy in Kinshasa, did not take adequate measures to secure M's return. The Home Office's interpretation was consistent with the contemporary understanding of the law, and Mr Justice Garland later revoked his order for lack of jurisdiction. However, M filed a motion in contempt against the Home Secretary for breaching the order while it was in force and should therefore have been complied with and before it had been officially revoked by the court.

== Judgment ==
=== Court of Appeal ===
A majority of the panel in the Court of Appeal, comprising Lord Justice Nolan and the Master of the Rolls, Lord Donaldson, held that the courts could exercise coercive powers against Ministers of the Crown, that the order of Garland J was valid, and that the Home Secretary was in breach of the order. Adopting the submission of leading counsel for M, Stephen Sedley QC, Nolan LJ said the following.

The proper constitutional relationship of the executive with the courts is that the courts will respect all acts of the executive within its lawful province, and that the executive will respect all decisions of the courts as to what its lawful province is.

=== House of Lords ===
The House of Lords affirmed the decision of the majority of the Court of Appeal and held that the Home Secretary acted in contempt of court, albeit that the Home Secretary was liable in his official capacity rather than personally.

Lord Templeman said the following:

For the purpose of enforcing the law against all persons and institutions ... the courts are armed with coercive powers exercisable in proceedings for contempt of court ...

...

My Lords, the argument that there is no power to enforce the law by injunction or contempt proceedings against a minister in his official capacity would, if upheld, establish the proposition that the executive obey the law as a matter of grace and not as a matter of necessity, a proposition which would reverse the result of the Civil War. For the reasons given by my noble and learned friend Lord Woolf and on principle, I am satisfied that injunctions and contempt proceedings may be brought against the minister in his official capacity and that in the present case the Home Office for which the Secretary of State was responsible was in contempt. I am also satisfied that Mr Baker was throughout acting in his official capacity, on advice which he was entitled to accept and under a mistaken view as to the law. In these circumstances I do not consider that Mr Baker personally was guilty of contempt. I would therefore dismiss this appeal substituting the Secretary of State for Home Affairs as being the person against whom the finding of contempt was made.

== See also ==
- United Kingdom constitutional law
