= List of television programs broadcast by Logo =

Beginning in June 2005, Logo TV has been broadcasting programming of interest to the LGBT community. The network broadcasts a blend of original programming and syndicated fare previously broadcast on other networks. Logo offers content from a wide variety of genres, including drama, comedy, reality and documentary. Logo also previously aired theatrically released films which were edited for time and content.

== Current ==
=== Original programming ===
- Canada's Drag Race (2022)
- RuPaul's Drag Race (First-run premieres moved to VH1 after 2017, from season 9 to 14; MTV since January 6, 2023 from season 15 onward)
- RuPaul's Drag Race All Stars (First-run premieres have moved to VH1 after season 2 and later Paramount+ from season 6 onward)
- RuPaul's Drag Race UK
- RuPaul's Drag Race: Untucked (Produced for the LogoTVLive website; first runs moved to VH1 in 2018 and MTV in 2023)

=== Syndicated programming ===
- Mama's Family
- Three's Company

== Former ==
=== Original programs ===
Title	Genre	Year
365gay News (Note: Formerly CBS News on Logo)	News program	2005–09
The Advocate Newsmagazine	News program	2006
Alien Boot Camp	Anthology series	2007-09
The Big Gay Sketch Show	Sketch comedy	2006–10
The Click List: 50 Greatest Films		
The Click List: Best in Short Film	Anthology series	2006–10
The Click List: Top 10 Videos	Music videos	
Coming Out Stories	Documentary series	2006
Exes & Ohs	Television drama	2006–09
Felt	Puppetry/Reality television	2013
Gay Skit Happens	Sketch comedy	2016
Jeffery & Cole Casserole	Sketch comedy	2009–10
NewNowNext Awards	Award ceremony	2008–
NewNowNext Music	Music video	2009–12
NewNowNext Poplab	Music video	2008–12
Noah's Arc	Comedy drama	2005–06
GLAAD Media Awards	Television special	2006
Real Gay	Television special	2005
Real Momentum	Documentary series	
Rick & Steve: The Happiest Gay Couple in All the World	Cartoon series	2007–09
The Ride: Seven Days to End AIDS	Documentary series	2006
Round Trip Ticket	LGBT tourism	2005
Sordid Lives: The Series	Sitcom	2008
That Sex Show	Sex advice panel show	2013
TransGeneration	Docuseries	2005
TripOut	LGBT tourism	
U.S. of ANT	LGBT tourism	2006
Visible Vote '08: A Presidential Forum	Television special	2007
Wisecrack	Stand-up comedy	2005

=== Other original programming ===
==== Reality ====
Title	Premiere date	Last aired	Source(s)
Open Bar	August 22, 2005	September 26, 2005	
Jacob and Joshua: Nemesis Rising	October 16, 2006	December 4, 2006	
Curl Girls	June 18, 2007		
Transamerican Love Story	February 11, 2008	March 31, 2008	
Gimme Sugar	June 9, 2008		
Shirts & Skins	September 15, 2008		
RuPaul's Drag U	July 19, 2010	August 6, 2012	
The A-List: New York	October 4, 2010	October 17, 2011	
The Arrangement	October 4, 2010	December 1, 2010	
Setup Squad	April 25, 2011	June 29, 2011	
Pretty Hurts	May 7, 2011	July 19, 2011	
The A-List: Dallas	October 10, 2011	December 19, 2011	
Bad Sex	November 4, 2011	June 10, 2014	
Finding Prince Charming	September 8, 2016	November 10, 2016	

==== Syndicated/co-produced programs ====
Title	Genre	Original network/Partner network
1 Girl 5 Gays	Talk show	MTV Canada
30 Rock	Sitcom	NBC
227	Sitcom	NBC
Absolutely Fabulous	British sitcom	BBC One
Alice	Sitcom	CBS
All in the Family	Sitcom	CBS
Bad Girls	Drama	ITV
Beautiful People	Comedy drama	BBC Two
Bewitched	Sitcom	ABC
Bob & Rose	Drama	ITV
Boston Legal	Drama	ABC
The Brady Bunch	Sitcom	ABC
Buffy the Vampire Slayer	Supernatural drama	The WB (1997–2001); UPN (2001–2003)
Bump!	LGBT tourism	OUTtv
Can't Get a Date	Reality television	VH1
The Cho Show	Sitcom	VH1
CSI: Crime Scene Investigation	Crime procedural	CBS
Daria	Animated cartoon	MTV
The Decorating Adventures of Ambrose Price	Reality television	HGTV
Designing Women	Sitcom	CBS
A Different World	Sitcom	NBC
Don't Trust the B— in Apartment 23	Sitcom	ABC
Drawn Together	Animated cartoon	Comedy Central
Ellen	Sitcom	ABC
Eurovision Song Contest	Entertainment	EBU
The Facts of Life	Sitcom	NBC
First Comes Love	Reality television	Global Television Network
Gilmore Girls	Comedy-drama	The WB; The CW
Glam God	Reality television	VH1
The Golden Girls	Sitcom	NBC
The Graham Norton Anthology	Anthology series	—N/a
Green Acres	Sitcom	CBS
Happily Divorced	Sitcom	TV Land
Happy Days	Sitcom	ABC
Happy Endings	Sitcom	ABC
I Dream of Jeannie	Sitcom	NBC
In the Life	News magazine	PBS
It's a Living	Sitcom	ABC; Syndication
The Jaquie Brown Diaries	Sitcom	TV3 (New Zealand)
Just Shoot Me!	Sitcom	NBC
The L Word	Drama	Showtime
Leap Years	Drama	Showtime
Laverne & Shirley	Sitcom	ABC
Living Single	Sitcom	Fox
Married... with Children	Sitcom	Fox
Maude	Sitcom	CBS
The Mindy Project	Romantic comedy	Fox; Hulu
Mork & Mindy	Sitcom	ABC
My Life as Liz	Sitcom	MTV
The Nanny	Sitcom	CBS
The New Adventures of Old Christine	Sitcom	CBS
NewsRadio	Sitcom	NBC
Nip/Tuck	Drama	FX
One Day at a Time (1975 TV series)	Sitcom	CBS
One Day at a Time (2017 TV series)	Sitcom	Netflix
Queer as Folk	Drama	Showtime
Queer Streets	Documentary	
The Real World: Brooklyn	Reality television	MTV
Reno 911!	Mockumentary	Comedy Central
Sabrina, the Teenage Witch	Sitcom	ABC; The WB
Samantha Who?	Sitcom	ABC
The Sarah Silverman Program	Sitcom	Comedy Central
Saturday Night Live	Sketch comedy	NBC
Schitt's Creek	Sitcom	Pop
A Shot at Love with Tila Tequila	Dating game show	MTV
Silver Spoons	Sitcom	NBC; Syndication
Sister, Sister	Sitcom	ABC; The WB
Soap	Sitcom	ABC
South Park	Animated cartoon	Comedy Central
South of Nowhere	Teen drama	The N
Strangers with Candy	Sitcom	Comedy Central
Tales of the City: The Complete Miniseries	Drama	Channel 4 (series 1); Showtime (series 2–3)
True Life	Documentary	MTV
Undressed	Anthology series	MTV
What's Happening!!	Sitcom	ABC
Who's the Boss?	Sitcom	ABC
Will & Grace	Sitcom	NBC
Wonderfalls	Comedy drama	Fox
The X-Files	Drama	Fox
Xena: Warrior Princess	Sword and sorcery	Broadcast syndication
