= Trinidad (2008 film) =

- Directed by: Jay Hodges, PJ Raval
- Produced by: Matt Dentler
- Cinematography: PJ Raval
- Edited by: Kyle Henry
- Production company: Surly Puppy
- Distributed by: Canadian Filmmakers' Distribution Centre (Theatrical); The Cinema Guild (DVD)
- Release date: 2008
- Running time: 86 minutes
- Country: United States
- Language: English

Trinidad is an American documentary film by Jay Hodges and PJ Raval. The film was screened at the IFP Market and IFP Rough Cuts Lab. In 2009, the film premiered on Showtime.

== Synopsis ==
Dr. Stanley Biber began conducting sex reassignment therapy in Trinidad, Colorado, in 1969. Dr. Marci Bowers, a former patient of Biber, took over his practice after his death. Trinidad focuses on Bowers and two of her patients at different stages of their transition from male to female.

== Cast ==
- Stanley Biber
- Marci Bowers
- Laura Ellis
- Sabrina Marcus

== Production ==
=== Development ===
Directors Jay Hodges and PJ Raval were intrigued by Trinidad's status as the "Sex Change Capital of the World" and the fact that Marci Bowers, the town's surgeon, had a transgender history. Neither director lived in the town, so they filmed in intervals of several months at a time. In an interview with Queerty, Raval said, "Our intention was not to sensationalize or exploit but to create something where people can see the universal struggle for self-expression and give people an opportunity to explore these concepts of gender and gender identity."

Trinidad received $4,000 for production and $7,000 for post-production through the Austin Film Society's Texas Filmmakers' Production Fund.

=== Music ===
Trinidad features music by Antony and the Johnsons, The Cinematic Orchestra, and Julia Kent.

== Reception ==
=== Critical response ===
Eric Campos, writing for Film Threat, gave the film 4 out of 5 stars and said, "Trinidad succeeds in presenting the materials for a better understanding of transsexual people and stands to be very instrumental in making the world outside of Trinidad, Colorado a safer place for them to live." IFC's Stephen Salto commented, "Hodges and Raval arrive in town just in time to shoot the construction of Morning Glow, a recovery house that not only provides a dramatic arc for the story, but slyly demonstrates how post-ops are just like anyone else, in moments as simple as arguing over the proper trim for the doors of the house."

=== Accolades ===
List of awards and nominations
Award	Category	Nominee	Result
Cleveland International Film Festival	Best Documentary	Jay Hodges, PJ Raval	Won
Los Angeles Film Festival	Best Documentary	Jay Hodges, PJ Raval	Nominated

== See also ==
- Sex Change Hospital (2007)
- TransGeneration (2005)
- A Change of Sex (1980)
