= Stanley Biber =

American physician

Stanley H. Biber
- Born: May 4, 1923; Des Moines, Iowa, US
- Died: January 16, 2006 (aged 82); Pueblo, Colorado, US
- Education: University of Iowa (1948)
- Occupation: Physician
- Years active: 1948–2006
- Known for: Sex reassignment surgery
- Medical career
- Profession: Surgeon
- Institutions: Mt. San Rafael Hospital

Stanley H. Biber (May 4, 1923 – January 16, 2006) was an American physician who was a pioneer in sex reassignment surgery, performing thousands of procedures during his long career.

== Early life ==
Biber was born to a Jewish family in Des Moines, Iowa as the older of two children and the only son of a father who owned a furniture store and a mother interested in social causes. His parents hoped he would become a pianist or a rabbi, and he briefly considered both before World War II began.

== Personal life ==
While studying at the University of Iowa, Biber practiced weightlifting. He tried out for the Olympic team and narrowly missed the cut.

Biber was divorced several times. He was survived by his wife of 11 months, Marylee Biber. He was survived by seven children, seven stepchildren and twenty-two grandchildren, including singer Snatam Kaur by his daughter Prabhu Nam Kaur Khalsa, also a new age singer.

Stanley and Marylee married after working together for four decades; Marylee was a nurse involved with his practice.

Later in life, Biber said that he did not see himself as a religious man.

== Career ==
=== Military service ===
Biber served as a civilian employee with the Office of Strategic Services during World War II, stationed in Alaska and the Northwest Territory. After the war, he returned to Iowa and enrolled in school, with plans to become a psychiatrist. He graduated from the University of Iowa medical school in 1948.

He began performing surgery while in residency at a hospital in the Panama Canal Zone. Biber then joined the Army, where he was the chief surgeon of a mobile army surgical hospital during the Korean War. He finished his service at what is now Fort Carson, Colorado.

=== Settling in Trinidad ===
In 1954, retiring from military service, Biber took a job at a United Mine Workers clinic in Trinidad, Colorado. His original office was in the First National Bank building at the historic heart of the city. Though he originally came to serve the miners, Biber sought to help the whole community and delivered babies, set broken bones, and was considered an excellent surgeon by the town.

=== Sex reassignment surgery ===
Biber performed his first sex reassignment surgery in 1969 after a trans woman asked him if he would be willing and able to do so. This woman was a friend of Biber's and a social worker whom he worked with often. She had been living as a woman and on hormone replacement therapy under the supervision of Dr. Harry Benjamin for some time. At first he did not know how to do this kind of operation, but he learned by studying diagrams and notes from Johns Hopkins Hospital.

By this point in time, Biber's practice had moved to Mt. San Rafael Hospital, which had been built by the Catholic order in 1889. The nuns running the hospital had just turned over ownership and control to the Trinidad Area Health Association in December 1968. Dr. Biber kept his first few surgeries secret from the Catholic nuns who operated the hospital, due to concerns that they would react negatively. During this period he kept his records in the hospital administrator's safe. However, after enough procedures and secret-keeping the doctor knew he had to come clean to his bosses and the community. So Biber, who was respected within the town as an Ob/Gyn, gathered together citizens, clergy, and town officials to explain that the people he served needed help. He also spoke about his point of view on the matter to the local paper in 1973. After this the attitude towards this aspect of Trinidad became generally accepting. He also made the point that the visitors brought in business to the local economy by staying in local hotels and eating at local restaurants with their families while they received and recovered from surgery. As another more pragmatic point he said that the profits brought in from his expensive surgeries were a key element in making Mt. San Rafael Hospital profitable. Though, according to his wife Marylee Biber, Dr. Biber did occasionally perform surgeries off the books for people who could not afford it. Trinidad was becoming known as the "Sex Change Capital of the World" because of his renown. The nuns who worked at the hospital actually worked with Dr. Biber and cared for his trans patients as well. “I couldn’t understand why the Sisters were looking over me while I was in the hospital and making sure transsexuals weren’t mistreated, and coming in to check on us,” recalled one of Biber's patients to the Los Angeles Times, “It never made sense to me. But I was grateful.”

Dr. Biber began performing vaginal construction surgeries when they were fairly rudimentary and refined the procedures around a half dozen times to achieve a more natural and realistic look. Biber's practice became the first private-practice transgender surgery center in the United States. During his career, Dr. Biber performed more than 2,300 male-to-female genital reassignment surgeries and 1,000 female-to-male surgeries. At the height of his practice he was doing as many as five gender change operations a week.

When Dr. Biber began his practice on gender changing surgeries, they were so rare in number in the United States that none of it was covered by any medical insurance and there were no widely used restrictions or guidelines on who qualified for a procedure. Biber made up his own criteria, trying to avoid performing an operation on someone who might later regret it. He identified schizophrenics and "effeminate homosexuals" and populations who may mistake themselves for transgender whom he wished to not operate on. Some of Dr. Biber's practices in restriction became codified with insurance companies or more common place among practices as the number of doctors performing the surgeries increased and insurance companies began to cover some operations. Those practices included psychological evaluations, a certain period of time spent with a psychiatrist, at least a year spent presenting in feminine dress, and at least a year spent taking feminizing hormones. If Dr. Biber was unsure whether to approve a patient for surgery he would sometimes recommend a more reversible procedure such as breast implants and invite the patient to return if they still wanted the genital reconstruction after having done that.

Biber also trained dozens of other surgeons in sex reassignment surgery techniques and maintained a regular surgical practice of delivering babies, removing tonsils, and replacing knee and hip joints. In 1985 Biber reported that transexual surgeries accounted for about 20% of his total work. Dr. Marci Bowers, another ob/gyn by practice and a trans woman herself, was trained by Biber and began to study under him in order to take over his practice so he could retire in 1998.

=== Political career ===
In 1990 a seat on the Las Animas County Board of Commissioners was vacated due to a recall, and Biber ran to fill it. His opponent ran ads in the local paper alleging that Dr. Biber's work had made an unseemly impact on the public image of the community. His campaign countered this with ads saying he had put Trinidad on the map and brought in $750,000 annually to the local economy. Biber won the election by a comfortable margin.

== Retirement and late life ==
Biber retired in 2003, at age 80, because his malpractice insurance premiums had risen to levels which he could not afford. Dr. Bowers finally took over his practice after five years of studying under him. Biber was hospitalized in January 2006 with complications from pneumonia, to which he succumbed on January 16. Bowers said, shortly afterwards, that she never expected to "fill his shoes".

== Related media ==
On March 9, 2005, the television show South Park first aired the episode "Mr. Garrison's Fancy New Vagina". In the opening scene, school-teacher Mr. Garrison believes that he is a woman on the inside, and decides to undergo a gender change surgery, which is performed by a "Dr. Biber" of the Trinidad Medical Center.

The documentary film Trinidad (2008) is about the town of Trinidad and its reputation as the "sex change capital of the world". Dr. Biber is mentioned often in the film, as is his protegée Dr. Bowers. The documentary-style reality series Sex Change Hospital (2007) gives a glimpse of Bowers's practice after Biber's retirement.

Journalist Martin J. Smith published a biography of Dr. Biber and Trinidad called Going to Trinidad: A Doctor, a Colorado Town, and Stories from an Unlikely Gender Crossroads in April 2021.
