= I Like the Way You Move =

I Like The Way You Move may refer to the following:

- "I Like the Way (You Move)", a 2005 single by the BodyRockers
- "I Like The Way You Move", a 2013 dance track with Pattie Brooks
- "I Like the Way You Move", an episode of the American TV series Transamerican Love Story
- I Like the Way You Move, 2021 British dating series

== See also ==
- "The Way You Move", a 2003 single by OutKast
