= GCAM =

GCAM may refer to:

- Gulf Coast Archive and Museum, an LGBT history organization in Neartown, Houston, Texas, US
- General Commission for Audiovisual Media, later General Authority of Media Regulation, Saudi Arabia
- Google Camera, now named Pixel Camera
