= Marci Bowers =

American gynecologist and surgeon (born 1958)

- Born: January 18, 1958 (age 68); Oak Park, Illinois, U.S.
- Education: University of Minnesota
- Occupation: Surgeon
- Known for: Gender-affirming surgery, clitoral restoration after female genital mutilation
- Children: 3
- Website: marcibowers.com

Marci Lee Bowers (born January 18, 1958) is an American gynecologist and surgeon who specializes in gender-affirming surgeries. Bowers is viewed as an innovator in gender confirmation/affirmation surgery, and is the first transgender woman to perform such surgeries.

Bowers operates at Mills-Peninsula Medical Center in Burlingame, California, and San Mateo Surgery Center in San Mateo, California. From 2003 to 2010, she practiced in the town of Trinidad, Colorado, where she apprenticed under Stanley Biber, a pioneer in sex reassignment surgery, before going solo in July 2003.

Bowers is also an international expert on functional clitoral restoration (also called clitoral reconstruction surgery) after female genital mutilation and cutting. From 2007 to 2009, she practised under Pierre Foldès, pioneer of clitoral restoration surgery.

She has spoken about her practice and other transgender topics in several documentaries, interviews, news reports, and articles. Media appearances have included The Oprah Winfrey Show (2007), The Tyra Banks Show (5 episodes), Today, Matt Walsh's What Is a Woman?, and CBS Sunday Morning feature. She is also the featured surgeon in the six-part 2006–2007 television series Sex Change Hospital. In May 2020, The Times featured Bowers on their Science Power List.

== Early life ==
Bowers was born in Oak Park, Illinois, and grew up in Oconomowoc, Wisconsin, as one of four siblings. At the age of 19, she hitchhiked to San Diego intending to begin her gender transition, but was unable to afford surgeries. She was briefly a member of the Unification Church of the United States, which she later described as a "cult". Bowers subsequently returned to Wisconsin and enrolled in college. She went on to attend the University of Minnesota Medical School where she was the class and student body president. After an ob/gyn residency at the University of Washington, she continued in Seattle as an obstetrician and gynecologist at The Polyclinic and Swedish Medical Center.

== Career ==
Before moving to Trinidad, Colorado, Bowers practiced obstetrics and gynecology at the PolyClinic/Swedish Medical Center in Seattle. In her 20 years practicing obstetrics, she delivered more than 2000 babies. She has served as Obstetrics and Gynecology Department Chairperson at Swedish (Providence) Medical Center, and was named the only physician member of the Washington State midwifery board. She is a member-elect of the European Academy of Sciences.

When Stanley Biber retired in 2003 at the age of 80, Bowers took over his practice, and since then, has done more than 2000 genital reassignment surgeries, performing as many as 12 gender affirming surgeries weekly. While performing surgery in Trinidad, Bowers estimated revenue at US$1.6 million per year to the hospital.

In 2010, she relocated to the San Francisco Bay Area and continues to practice in Burlingame, California. She has also helped initiate transgender surgical education programs at Sheba Medical Center in Tel Aviv (2014), Icahn School of Medicine at Mount Sinai in New York (2016), Denver Health in Colorado (2018), and University of Toronto (2019). The transgender surgical fellowship at Mount Sinai is acknowledged as the first of its kind in the United States.

In 2018 and 2019, Bowers performed the first live surgical vaginoplasty surgeries in surgical educational programs sponsored by the World Professional Association for Transgender Health (WPATH) Mount Sinai Hospital in New York.

Bowers was the president of WPATH from 2022-2024, and has served on the board of directors for both GLAAD and the Transgender Law Center.

Bowers is the first U.S. surgeon to perform clitoral restoration surgery for survivors of female genital mutilation, whom she does not charge for surgery. She was trained for this specific operation under Pierre Foldès and has now performed more than 500 clitoral restorations at her clinic in San Mateo.

She has led medical missions to Burkina Faso (2014), Nairobi, Kenya (2017 and 2019). Working with local plastic surgeon, Abdullahi Adan, and others, this specific surgical venue is a first for Africa after the failed opening of the Pleasure Hospital in Bobo-Dioulasso. Dr. Bowers runs a charity called the Marci Foundation to fundraise and organize for the surgeries meant to restore healthy genital shape and function to women affected by FGM. This includes surgical treatment for both Type IB FGM (removal of the clitoris) and Type III FGM (cutting and sewing the labia shut, causing them to heal together as one piece).

== Media appearances ==
Bowers's first known television appearance was a role in "Ch-ch-ch-changes" (2004), a season 5 episode of CSI: Crime Scene Investigation that focused on transgender issues. She also served as a production consultant for the episode.

She appeared briefly in the 2005 documentary-series TransGeneration, produced by World of Wonder; soon after, World of Wonder turned their attention to Bowers herself and her practice, in their 2007 documentary series Sex Change Hospital—a six-episode series that follows 12 patients before, during, and after surgery. Sex Change Hospital premiered on More4, and was rebroadcast on E4 in the UK and WE tv in the US. She and her practice were also the focus of Trinidad (2009), an independent documentary directed by PJ Raval and Jay Hodges. The filmmakers examine the success of Dr. Bowers's practice, and the transgender people who travel to the town of Trinidad, Colorado, for sex reassignment surgery. The film premiered in the US on the Showtime channel.

Bowers appears as herself in the television documentary Gender Revolution: A Journey with Katie Couric (2017), and in the reality series I Am Jazz from 2016 to 2018 (seasons 3 through 6). She has been a guest on US talk shows including The Oprah Winfrey Show and The Tyra Banks Show.

She has been interviewed for several publications. She is the author of at least five book chapters in surgical textbooks.

In 2020, Bowers made an appearance in the HBO documentary Transhood, where she performed 19-year-old Leena's gender reassignment surgery.

In 2022, Bowers appeared in The Daily Wire documentary What Is a Woman?

In an interview with journalist and author Abigail Shrier, Bowers expressed some concern over early suppression of puberty. Talking to Emily Bazelon of The New York Times Magazine in June 2022, Bowers distanced herself from others interviewed by Shrier, stating: "The most important thing is access to care, and that is a much bigger problem than the issue of how the medical community and transition is failing people."

== Opposition ==
In 2005, Terry Keith, a pastor for the All Nations Fellowship church in Trinidad, told The Pueblo Chieftain "Our reputation as sex-change capital of the world has brought shame and reproach on the community." That same year, two pastors circulated a petition for the closure of the clinic. They cited a Johns Hopkins University study that they claimed was proof that gender confirmation surgeries were an ineffective treatment for gender dysphoria. The petition was rejected. Bowers said that the church misrepresented the study data: "If you look at the actual study itself, the satisfaction rates and happiness rates after [surgeries] were overwhelmingly positive, their interpretation of the study was that the respondents—the patients themselves—couldn't possibly be accurate about what they were feeling, because they were crazy in the first place. There's been nothing like it since—and it's very important to point out that it's from 1972."

After Pierre Foldès's study in The Lancet (February 2012), his results were met with skepticism from British gynecologists who wrote a rebuttal to his findings, questioning his methods and outcomes. Bowers is conducting ongoing studies using standard measures of female sexual function to definitively affirm Foldès's conclusions, but as Bowers has stated, "There is no happier text that I receive at three in the morning than someone stating they have had their first orgasm in their life."

== Personal life ==
Bowers and her wife have three children.

== See also ==
- LGBT people in science
