= Julia Grant (transgender activist) =

British transgender activist (1954–2019)

Julia Grant (born 21 September 1954 – 2 January 2019) was the first transgender person to have her transition chronicled on a mainstream UK television documentary in A Change of Sex.

In George and Julia (1979), the first of five hour-long film documentaries directed by David Pearson for the BBC, her story attracted an audience of nearly nine million viewers. The series was transmitted on BBC2, as A Change of Sex, and described by Pearson as "intimate, frank and observational". Additional episodes were broadcast until 1999, charting new stages in her life.

== Early life ==
Born in Fleetwood, Lancashire, she was the eldest child of Philip Roberts, a trawlerman, and his wife, Jessica. Jessica was an alcoholic, who attempted suicide several times, whilst Phillip was a violent drunkard who reportedly tried to rape Julia when she was a child. As one of eight children, Julia often cared for her younger brothers and sisters. She also spent periods in a children's home in Preston, and as a teenager, prostituted herself to men. This was said to be "a misguided cry" for the affection that she did not get from her parents, and she used the money for sweets.

== Television fame and gender reassignment ==
In 1974, after a failed marriage, she moved to London, and in 1978, when the BBC began filming, she was a catering manager who performed as a drag queen. However, it became apparent that drag did not feel right to her, and the BBC filmed her last drag performance. Julia had realized that she was not a male homosexual, and "wanted to live as a woman".

As a precondition for receiving treatment at the Charing Cross Hospital unit – at the time, the main clinic in the UK dealing with transgender patients – Julia began living, working and dressing as a woman. She asked the BBC series director Pearson for name suggestions, and from this list, chose Julia Grant.

The NHS psychiatrist who ran the clinic was persuaded to let the BBC film all of his consultations with Julia, although with the stipulation that he would not be named on air, or be seen on screen. According to Pearson, "his voice suggested a plummy sense of entitled authority, tinged with arrogance, often expressing stereotypical attitudes towards women, even by 70s standards." The psychiatrist was later revealed to be John Randell.

The week before the first programme in the series was shown, Sunday tabloids published hostile stories about Julia and the films. Despite this, she was determined to become the "woman I want to be". It was this, says Pearson, coupled with "gritty humour while overcoming her setbacks" – such as the way she was treated by Randell – which "convinced many TV viewers, that her cause was legitimate", and the BBC received a large number of letters in support of Julia and the films.

Grant was living with Amir, a refugee who had fled from persecution in Iraq, who accepted her as a woman. As they wished to progress their relationship, Julia did not want to delay the operations. In a series of "combative encounters", Randell was dismissive of Julia's goals, as he did not believe her to be ladylike enough, and thought her too "pushy".

Grant ignored Randell's advice, and found a way to get breast implants at a private clinic. Randell was "furious" and Grant realised that he would not support her ambition for full genital surgery.

A private surgeon, Michael Royle, and his colleague, was sympathetic to Grant's problem, and agreed to operate. When Grant woke up after the operation, she was "in great pain but ecstatic". It seemed to have been a success, but Grant needed time to recover, and filming was put on hold for several years. She later told the programme makers that, several weeks after the surgery, she had collapsed bleeding and been taken to hospital unconscious, where she was treated for a suspected miscarriage by doctors who were not aware of her medical history.

Grant's surgery was damaged, and she was unable to have sex; she was embarrassed to get help or to confide in Amir about the reason they could not have sex, and their relationship worsened. The couple split up, and he left the UK. Grant thought that she would not be able to receive any further treatment, in a period described by Pearson as "perhaps the lowest point of her life".

A follow up film was proposed in the mid 2010s, but was scrapped after commissioners cited an oversaturation of transgender focused stories.

== Subsequent life ==
Grant wrote two memoirs about her experiences, George & Julia (1980) and Just Julia (1994). In the late 1990s, the final BBC film caught up with Grant living in Manchester and running the busy Hollywood Show Bar. She wanted to marry her new partner, Alan Sunderland, and her former surgeon Royle said that he could resolve her surgical problem. However, Grant, together with Sunderland, decided that she would not proceed with more surgery, and could instead "be happy as they were". The couple had a church blessing, and Grant thought of herself as married. She owned a number of cafes and bars in Manchester's Canal Street Gay Village, fought against redevelopment plans for the area, and was active in establishing local LGBTQ events.

Grant and her partner moved to France's Creuse region, where she built up a ceramics business, and locals called her "La Madame Anglaise". However, one morning, Sunderland ate breakfast and departed from Grant's life for good. Grant went to live in Spain, where she ran a hotel in Benidorm and began Benidorm Gay Pride.

Grant told people wanting gender reassignment that changing sex "would not solve all their problems", and some members of the trans community found her views controversial. This largely related to her disagreement with young children transitioning using surgery, hormones, or what is known today as the "social gender role transition", in which they present as their actual gender full time. Grant spent time in America counselling young people who were thinking about the process.

== Illness ==
After being diagnosed with bowel cancer, Grant returned to the UK in 2015, and committed herself to helping other trans people. She encouraged improved trans care services, and took part in discussions at the NHS's Nye Bevan Academy, a facility which trains health service leaders. In 2016 she was diagnosed with kidney failure.

== Death ==
Grant died on 2 January 2019, at St Catherine's Hospice. Following her 2016 diagnosis of kidney failure, she was awaiting a kidney transplant when she suffered a heart attack. Following this Grant decided to stop treatment, and died aged 64. At the time of her death, she was survived by sisters Shirley, Jeanne, Lesley, Julie and Beverley, along with two brothers, Gary and Danny. Grant was also survived by an aunt named Mary and her two own children, born in the early 1970s during her own marriage.

== See also ==
- Sex reassignment therapy
- Transsexual
- List of transgender people
- Timeline of LGBT history in Britain
- My Transsexual Summer (2011)
- Sex Change Hospital (2007)
- Up Series
- Can't Get You Out of My Head (TV series) (2021)
