= Snatam Kaur =

American singer-songwriter (born 1972)

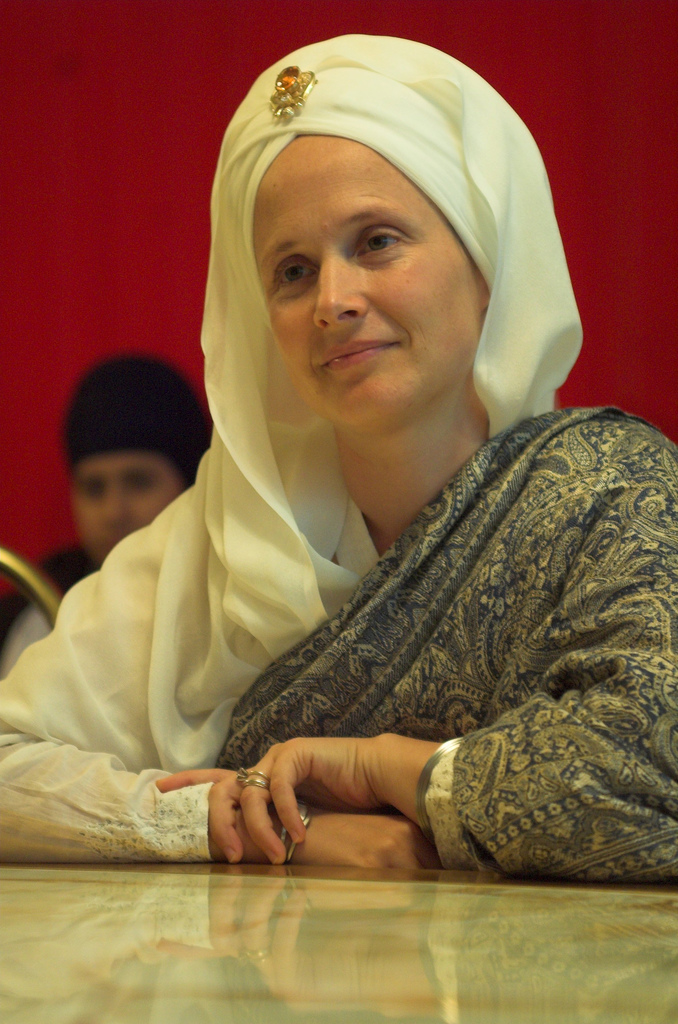
- September 10, 2007, Snatam Kaur in Hockley, Birmingham, England.

Background information
- Born: June 19, 1972 (age 54); Trinidad, Colorado
- Genres: Mantra, Meditation, New Age, Female Vocalists
- Occupation: Musician
- Years active: 2000–present
- Labels: Spirit Voyage Records, Be Why Music
- Website: www.snatamkaur.com

Snatam Kaur Khalsa /səˈnɑːtəm ˈkɔːr/ (born June 19, 1972 in Trinidad, Colorado), is an American singer, songwriter and author. Kaur performs new age Indian devotional music, kirtan, and tours the world as a peace activist. The surname "Kaur", meaning "princess", is shared by all female Sikhs.

== Early life and education ==
Her family moved to California when Snatam was two, living in Long Beach and Sacramento. When Snatam was six, the family visited India, where her mother studied kirtan. Snatam lived on a ranch near Bolinas, California until 8th grade and then moved to Mill Valley in 1986. During her childhood, she played kirtan with her mother in Gurdwaras and at Sikh religious ceremonies. She attended Tamalpais High School in Mill Valley. While at Tam High, she played violin in the school orchestra and began songwriting. Bob Weir of the Grateful Dead coached Kaur and her classmates before they performed her song "Saving the Earth" at an Earth Day concert in San Francisco on April 22, 1990.

Snatam was also active in social and environmental causes while in high school, serving as president of a social action club known as "Students for Justice" in her senior year. The club started a campus recycling program and organized environmental awareness programs. The club also led the effort to change the school mascot and sports team names from the Indians to the Red Tailed Hawk in 1989 and 1990, inspired by a speech given at the school by Sacheen Littlefeather.

After graduating from Tam, Snatam attended Mills College in Oakland, California, receiving a bachelor's degree in biochemistry. She then returned to India to study Kirtan under her mother's teacher, Bhai Hari Singh. In 1997, Kaur began a career as a food technologist with Peace Cereals in Eugene, Oregon.

== Snatam's music ==
In 2000, Kaur signed with Spirit Voyage Records — the founder of which, Guru Ganesha Singh Khalsa, became her manager and guitarist. Her professional collaboration has included new age music producer Thomas Barquee and occasionally her mother, Prabhu Nam Kaur Khalsa, also a musician.

== Discography ==
Release date	Album Title	Record Label
2000	Reunion: with Guru Ganesha Singh Khalsa and Livtar Singh Khalsa	Spirit Voyage Records
2000	To Heaven and Beyond: with Guru Ganesha Singh, Livtar Singh and Tony Redhouse	Spirit Voyage Records
2002	Carry Us Home: with Guru Ganesha Singh and Livtar Singh	Spirit Voyage Records
2002	Prem (Love)	Spirit Voyage Records
2003	Shanti	Spirit Voyage Records
2004	Grace	Spirit Voyage Records
2005	Celebrate Peace	Spirit Voyage Records
2005	Mother's Blessing: with Prabhu Nam Kaur	Spirit Voyage Records
2006	Anand	Spirit Voyage Records
2007	LIVE in Concert: with Guru Ganesha Singh, Manish Vyas and Ram Dass	Spirit Voyage Records
2007	Amrit Vela - Sadhana Chants: with Tarn Taran Singh	Spirit Voyage Records
2008	Teree Meher Da Bolanaa	Spirit Voyage Records
2008	Meditations for Transformation 1: Merge & Flow	Spirit Voyage Records
2008	Meditations for Transformation 2: Connect & Heal	Spirit Voyage Records
2008	Meditations for Transformation 3: Release & Overcome	Spirit Voyage Records
2009	Liberation's Door: with Guru Ganesha Singh	Spirit Voyage Records
2010	The Essential Snatam Kaur: Sacred Chants For Healing	Spirit Voyage Records Under License To Sounds True
2010	Divine Birth: with Prabhu Nam Kaur	Spirit Voyage Records
2011	Ras	Spirit Voyage Records
2011	Feeling Good Today	Spirit Voyage Records
2012	Evening Prayer - Kirtan Sohila	Spirit Voyage Records
2012	Heart Of The Universe: with Peter Kater	Point of Light Records/Spirit Voyage
2013	Sat Nam! Songs from Khalsa Youth Camp: with Siri Nam Singh	Spirit Voyage Records
2014	Light of the Naam: Morning Chants: with Ajeet Kaur and Thomas Barquee	Spirit Voyage Records
2018	Beloved	Spirit Voyage Records
2022	Nirankaar	Be Why Music

== The Celebrate Peace tour ==
From 2003 to 2009 Snatam Kaur spent much of each year on a perpetual tour called the "Celebrate Peace tour." Her tour took her several times across North America, twice to Europe, and twice to South America. The tour included performances at schools, hospices, juvenile detention centers, and other facilities. Kaur is a featured teacher and "Peace Ambassador" for the 3HO Foundation (a non-governmental organization affiliated with the United Nations since 1996). Snatam Kaur toured with her longtime musical partner Guru Ganesha Singh Khalsa, a guitarist and vocalist, and various other musicians. After her marriage, her husband, graphic artist, Sopurkh Singh also traveled with Snatam Kaur.

== Sat Nam Fest, recent and current tours ==
Since the birth of her daughter, Snatam Kaur has considerably scaled down her performances, though she still comes out for the Sat Nam Fest Kundalini Yoga and Music Festivals held annually in Pennsylvania, California and Mexico, bringing her daughter and husband in tow. Her band in her current (2019) tour includes Ram Dass Khalsa (clarinet, guitar, vocals), Sukhmani Rayat (tabla), and Bruno Justi (Guitar, Flutes).

== Books ==
Release date	Book Title	Publisher
2016	The Meditation Summit: Volume 1: Deepen and Expand Your Meditation Practice with the World's Leading Teachers (Author, Narrator): with Reginald A. Ray (Author, Narrator), Sharon Salzberg (Author, Narrator) and eight others.	Sounds True
2016	Original Light: The Morning Practice of Kundalini Yoga.	Sounds True
2016	Meditation of the Soul: Jap Ji Daily Practice and Learning Tool.	Spirit Voyage

== Sikh influence on Kaur's music ==
Sikhism is a religion that began in India in the mid-fifteenth century with the first Guru, known as Guru Nanak Dev Ji (1469-1539 C.E.). The essence of being a Sikh is that one lives one’s life according to the teachings of the Sikh Gurus, devoting time to meditating on God and the scriptures, chanting, and living life in a way that benefits other people and the world. Kaur’s teacher, Yogi Bhajan (1929-2004), was influential in helping promote the Sikh tradition in the West.

Sikhism is based on the Shabad Guru. On Kaur's official website she explains, “Shabad is the sacred energy or recitation of sound, and Guru means the living teacher. For Sikhs, our living Guru exists within the sacred words of our tradition and physically within the Sikh holy book known as the Guru Granth Sahib.”

== Reviews and critical acclaim ==
Snatam Kaur has received numerous positive reviews of her concerts and albums, especially in alternative and yogic media. These include LA Yoga, The Olympian (Olympia, WA), Light Connection, The Union (Nevada County, CA), The New Sunday Times (Malaysia), and Yoga Chicago. In 2010, her album Essential Snatam Kaur: Sacred Chants for Healing peaked at number nine on the Billboard listing of Top New Age Music Albums. Snatam Kaur's career also received a boost when it became known that her music was a favorite of Oprah Winfrey. Kaur was nominated for a 2019 Grammy for her album Beloved.

== Personal life ==
Snatam lives in the United States with her husband Sopurkh Singh, whom she married in January 2006, and their daughter, Jap Preet Kaur.

Snatam is the granddaughter of Dr. Stanley Biber.
