= Ghada Hatem-Gantzer =

Lebanese obstetrician-gynecologist

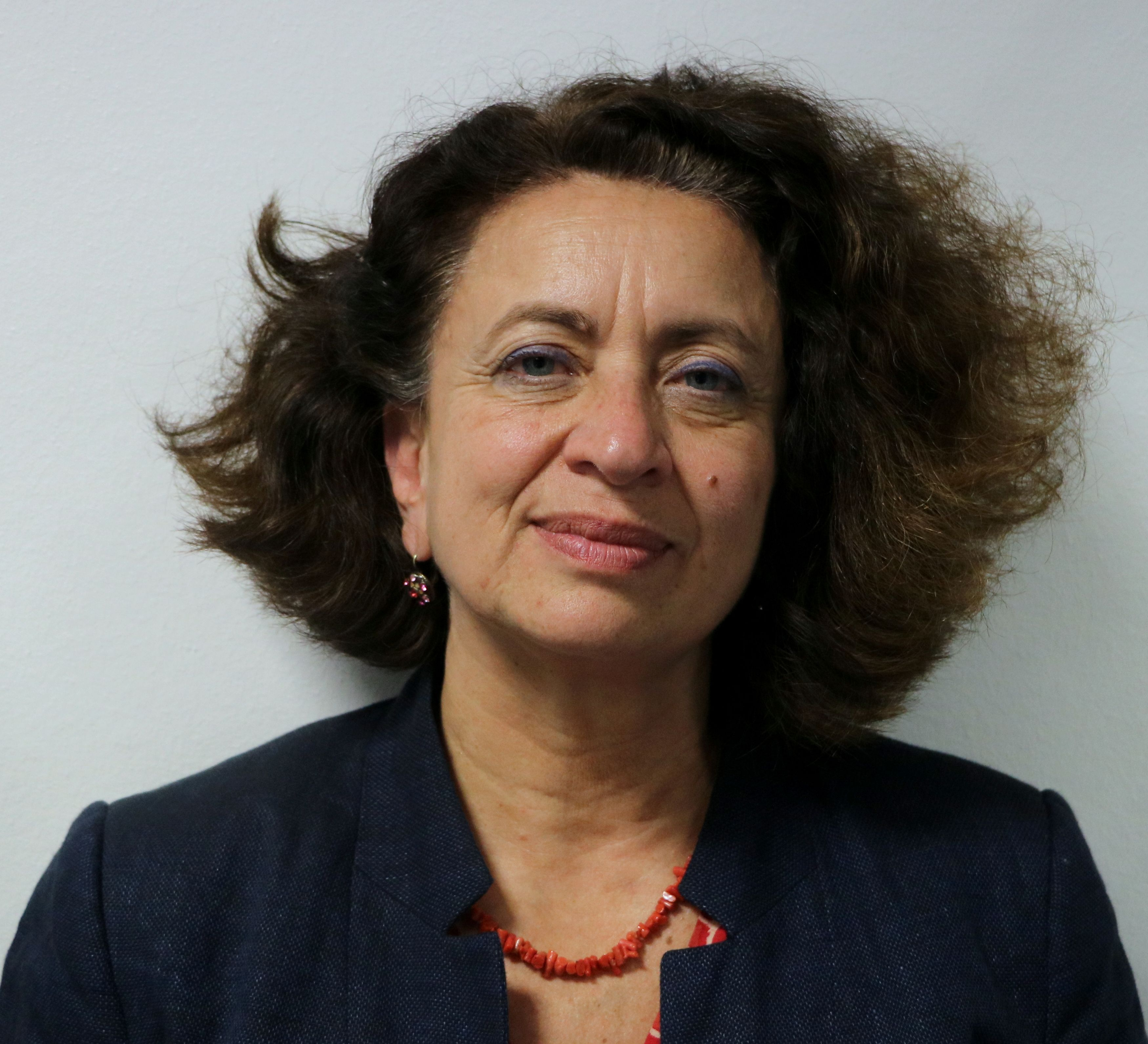
- Born: Ghada Hatem; 1959 (age 66–67); Hammana
- Education: Grand Lycée Franco-Libanais et al
- Occupations: Obstetrician and gynecologist
- Employer: Centre hospitalier de Saint-Denis
- Known for: founding the Maison des Femmes

Ghada Hatem-Gantzer, born Ghada Hatem (Arabic: غادة حاتم, romanized: Ghādah Ḥātim; born 1959) is a Lebanese obstetrician and gynecologist living in France. She is known as an advocate of women's rights and for creating the Maison des Femmes in 2016.

== Life ==
Hatem-Gantzer was born in 1959 in Hammana in the Baabda district of Lebanon. She went to school at the Lycée Français in Beirut and she became a francophile. Her country was in a civil war and she left Lebanon in 1977 to study medicine in France.

She had intended to be a psychiatrist but she became an obstetrician and a gynecologist.

She began to lead the maternity unit of the Centre hospitalier de Saint-Denis in 2011. This is a large facility that deals with 4,000 births each year from an international community, She found that the hospital could not cope with the domestic abuse and other issues that were being presented. She was working at the Centre Hospitalier Delafontaine. She had access the records of 4,700 women who had given birth and of those approximately 15% had experienced genital mutilation. She was taught how to repair the damage of FGM by Pierre Foldès who had invented the technique.

She founded the Maison des Femmes in July 2016, The building was constructed on the hospital's last vacant lot. She had to gather nearly a million euros to fund its construction. The facility is not funded by the state as she believes it should be. The building and running of the Maison des Femmes is funded by charitable foundations including the Elle Foundation and the Kering Foundation. The French state do fund the cost of reconstructive surgery for women who have experienced FGM. Initially in 2004 it was only for those in pain but the criteria has been relaxed. Hatem-Gantzen conducts about 100 surgeries every year to reconstruct clitoris damaged by FGM. Some of her patients were not aware that they had been damaged by FGM. She is able to make repairs because only a small part of the clitoris is on the surface. However she does not promise that it will restore the full pleasure, but it will create an improvement.

The Maison des Femmes employs people with a range of skills that include medicine and the police. They are a source of assistance to women with contraception. They also support those involved with sexual abuse, female genital mutilation, rape and domestic violence.

In 2024 she was given the honour of carrying the Olympic torch for the Paris Olympics.

== Private life ==
She studied and lives in Paris. She married a Frenchman and has three grown-up children.
