= Odile Buisson =

French gynacologist and writer

- Born: Odile Poullaouec; Dunkirk
- Occupations: obstetrician and gynecologist
- Known for: investigating the clitoris and the phenomena of the G-spot

Odile Buisson born Odile Poullaouec is a French gynaecologist and writer. She was a co-researcher of sonography that revealed the internal structure of the clitoris.

== Life ==
Buisson was born in Malo-les-Bains, Dunkirk. She had strict parents and gynaecology was one of the subjects that was not discussed. Her sex education happened when she was twelve. She spent her teenage years in Brittany at Saint-Nazaire. She was studying medicine and gynaecology in 1973 which is where she and her husband met.

She began a collaboration with fellow gynaecologist Pierre Foldès who she first met in 2004. His work had inspired a 2006 award-winning book. Foldès surprised her by proposing that they should use ultrasound to study the structure of the g-spot and the clitoris. She was surprised that she had not thought of doing it before and she was not sure of the anatomy that they would discover. Foldès had found that there was virtually no academic study of the clitoris which compared with thousands of published papers that investigated the penis. They used volunteers are they looked at the structures during sexual intercourse.

In 2008, they published the first complete 3D sonography of the stimulated clitoris. In 2009 their further research, demonstrated how the erectile tissue of the clitoris surrounds the vagina. They suggested "that the special sensitivity of the lower anterior vaginal wall ("the G-Spot") could be explained by pressure and movement of clitoris's root during a vaginal penetration and subsequent perineal contraction. The G-spot could be explained by the richly innervated clitoris".

In 2010 she highlighted the discrimination by universities that resulted in there being many more studies of male as distinct from female sexuality. She was also a co-author of the paper "Who's Afraid of the G-spot? that year. This was a review by six scientists who looked at the available literature to investigate the phenomena known as the G-Spot. It was published in the Journal of Sexual Medicine which concluded that more research was required.

In 2011 her and Foldès' book Qui a peur du point G?: le plaisir féminin, une angoisse masculine was published.

== Awards ==
Buisson was knighted in 2013 after 33 years' service and she joined the Legion of Honor.
