= A Change of Sex =

- Title card used from 1994
- Directed by: David Pearson
- Starring: Julia Grant
- Country of origin: England
- Original language: English

Production
- Executive producer: Roger Mills
- Cinematography: Mike Southon
- Editors: David Gladwell; Tony Heaven

Original release
- Release: 25 June 1979 – 10 August 1999

A Change of Sex is a multi-part television documentary about English trans woman Julia Grant. The first chapter, initially titled George, premiered on BBC2 in 1979. It is one of the first documentary films about transgender issues.

BBC2 repeated the programme in 1980, followed by two new chapters, Julia: The First Year and Julia: My Body, My Choice. A revised version aired in 1994, accompanied by another new chapter, The Untold Story, which updates viewers on Julia's life of the past 15 years. The final instalment, Julia Gets Her Man, followed in 1999. David Pearson directed the films.

Julia Grant was born in 1954. The documentary introduces us to her as George Roberts, a catering manager. Although she performs as a drag queen, George says she has never felt at home in gay male culture. She feels inside that she is a woman, and she wishes for sex reassignment surgery. The National Health Service refers her to the Gender Identity Clinic at Charing Cross Hospital. As she sits in the consulting room, we hear the voice of her psychiatrist, but we never see his face. His attitude toward Grant is stern and disparaging. His deskside manner was the inspiration for the character Dr Ira Carlton, a "despotic GP who rules his patients with eccentric zeal" in the black comedy series The League of Gentlemen.

Beyond the consulting room, the filmmakers follow Julia through her experiences of hormone therapy, shopping for women's clothing, gender confirmation surgeries, her professional life, and other dimensions of her transition.

Julia Grant died on 2 January 2019, aged 64.

== Production and broadcast ==
A Change of Sex began as an episode of Inside Story, a documentary television series oriented toward investigative journalism. There was sufficient interest in the episode, titled George, for Pearson to explore Grant's story further. He and his crew filmed her progress in 1979 and 1980. George was retitled George: The Big Decision, and the more recent footage was edited into two new chapters: Julia: The First Year and Julia: My Body, My Choice. This three-film series was titled A Change of Sex, and BBC2 broadcast it in October 1980. New English Library published Grant's autobiography, George and Julia, that same month.

In 1993, Pearson revisited Grant to film a fourth chapter of the documentary about her life. Filming and editing continued into 1994, but the earlier programmes were also edited in order to make a four-part story into a trilogy: George & Julia, Desperate Measures, and The Untold Story. This revised version of A Change of Sex aired on BBC2 in August 1994. The broadcast coincided with the publication of Grant's second memoir, Just Julia: The Story of an Extraordinary Woman.

In 1998, Pearson filmed Grant once more. BBC2 repeated the 1994 edition of the previous films in July and August 1999 before broadcasting the final chapter, Julia Gets Her Man. It updates viewers on developments in Grant's life over the past four years, including a new job and a growing relationship.

=== Broadcast history ===
==== George (Inside Story episode) ====
Title	Photographed by	Edited by	Original release date
"George"	Mike Southon	David Gladwell	25 June 1979
24-year-old George Roberts feels that he is a woman, and he wants to have sex reassignment surgery. Before the National Health Service will approve the surgical procedures, they refer him to a psychiatrist in the Gender Identity Clinic at Charing Cross Hospital. The psychiatrist tells George that he must first live as a woman for one year. George throws away his men's clothing, informs his employer, and (per the hospital's requirements) finds a new flat nearer to the clinic.

==== A Change of Sex ====
1980 broadcast
No.	Title	Photographed by	Edited by	Original release date
1	"George: The Big Decision"	Mike Southon	David Gladwell	15 October 1980
Julia is a catering manager who wishes to transition medically. She seeks help at Charing Cross Hospital.
2	"Julia: The First Year"	David Feig / Mike Southon	?	16 October 1980
Julia must live as a woman socially for one year before the NHS will approve her gender confirmation surgery.
3	"Julia: My Body, My Choice"	David Feig / Keith Taylor	Tony Heaven	17 October 1980
With the support of her boyfriend and her mother, Julia has gender confirmation surgery with Dr Michael Royle.

1994 and 1999 broadcasts
No.	Title	Air date	
No.	Title	1994 broadcast	1999 broadcast
1	"George & Julia"	4 August 1994	20 July 1999
Julia is a catering manager who wishes to transition medically. As required by the NHS and a psychiatrist at Charing Cross Hospital, she lives as a woman socially for one year to qualify for gender confirmation surgery.
2	"Desperate Measures"	11 August 1994	27 July 1999
With the support of her boyfriend and her mother, Julia has gender confirmation surgery with Dr Michael Royle.
3	"The Untold Story"	18 August 1994	3 August 1999
Julia is a ceramicist with a factory in Chesterfield; she also teaches ceramics classes on-site.
4	"Julia Gets Her Man"	N/A	10 August 1999
Julia is now the proud owner-operator of Hollywood Showbar, a gay bar and drag venue in Manchester. She and her boyfriend wish to marry.

== Reception and legacy ==
The psychiatrist's deskside manner was the inspiration for the character Dr Ira Carlton, a "despotic GP who rules his patients with eccentric zeal" in the black comedy series The League of Gentlemen.

Extensive clips from the programmes featured in Adam Curtis's 2021 series Can't Get You Out of My Head.

== See also ==
- Sex reassignment therapy
- Transsexual
- List of transgender people
- Timeline of LGBT history in Britain
- My Transsexual Summer (2011)
- Sex Change Hospital (2007)
- Up Series
