= Zoe Luper =

- All My Children character
- Portrayed by: Jeffrey Carlson
- Duration: 2006–07
- First appearance: August 23, 2006
- Last appearance: April 26, 2007
- Created by: Megan McTavish and Agnes Nixon
In-universe information
- Other names: Zarf; Freddie
- Occupation: Singer
- Father: Bill Luper
- Mother: Marje Luper

Zoe Luper is a fictional character portrayed by actor Jeffrey Carlson on the ABC daytime drama All My Children. Zoe is perhaps the first transgender television character depicted at the beginning of male-to-female transition and coming out. The character debuted in August 2006 as Zarf, an English rock star who presents as male. Zarf/Zoe returned during the period of November 29, 2006 to April 26, 2007.

Zoe was created by All My Children head writer Megan McTavish. She was inspired by TransGeneration (2005), a documentary-style reality series about transgender students at US universities.

== Storylines ==
Zoe is introduced on August 23, 2006, as Freddie Luper, a male-presenting English musician whose stage name is Zarf. Due to a strained relationship with her father, Freddie had left home at age 16. In 2006, Babe Carey Chandler and Josh Madden persuade Zarf to sign a contract allowing them to use her music in an ad campaign for Fusion Cosmetics.

In the episode of November 29, 2006, Zarf causes a stir by meditating in the nude at the offices of Fusion Cosmetics (to connect with the creative energies). Zarf meets Bianca Montgomery, and instantly falls in love with her, but when Zarf kisses her, she is angry, and informs her that she is a lesbian. Zarf realizes that there is a reason she was attracted to a lesbian. On New Year's Eve, Zarf comes out as a transgender lesbian named Zoe.

Later, Zoe (still presenting as Zarf) is suspected of being the Satin Slayer, a serial killer who poisoned Simone Torres and Erin Lavery, and who attempted to kill Danielle Frye. When she is openly accused at the Chandler Mansion, she reveals that she is transgender. No one believes her except Babe. Some people in the town of Pine Valley come to accept Zoe as a woman, but others remain skeptical of her and of transgender experience in general. Zoe is attacked by the Satin Slayer and survives. She is cleared of suspicion when the true killer is revealed to be Alexander Cambias, Sr.

As part of her transition, Zoe joins a transgender support group and meets with an endocrinologist. She talks with her mother about being transgender; their relationship improves. Zoe says she has not decided whether or not to undergo genital reassignment surgery. She receives a letter from her father, who says that he hopes to be able one day to accept and love Zoe as he loved Freddie. She returns to her home in London to continue her transition, and to begin work on a new album. Bianca goes with her.

== Creation ==
Zoe was created by Megan McTavish, head writer for All My Children. Her inspiration for the character was TransGeneration (2005), a docusoap about transgender students at universities in the US. "I found [the students'] experiences so moving that I started thinking along those lines," she said. Before taping Zoe's episodes, the production team consulted with transgender people and the US non-profit GLAAD (Gay & Lesbian Alliance Against Defamation). Jeffrey Carlson, who plays Zoe, is an American actor who affects an English accent for the role.

All My Children executive producer Julie Hanan Carruthers issued a public relations statement when Zoe's forthcoming storyline was announced:

All My Children has a long-standing commitment to telling socially relevant stories that entertain and inform. Viewers can expect a heartfelt story between two people who share a common ground, yet learn about inherent differences and understanding. At its core, this is a story of acceptance and love.

Carruthers told the Associated Press that All My Children was in search of something new, and that the production team was aware that their audience was drawn to plot elements dealing with sex and sexuality. The show had lost more than 60% of its audience since 1992.

Although Zoe is not the first transgender character to appear in a US daytime drama, she may be the first transfeminine character on US television to come out as transgender, and then to begin transitioning. In The City, a daytime drama that aired on ABC from 1995 to 1997, Carlotta Chang played Azure C., a model who has already transitioned, and who comes out to her fiancé as transsexual. In early 2006, The L Word introduced a storyline in which the character Moira Sweeney comes out as a trans man, and changes his given name to Max as part of his transition. Max is portrayed by Daniel Sea.

== See also ==
- List of All My Children characters
- Laura Jane Grace
- Maya Avant
