= PJ Raval =

American film director

- Born: 1974 (age 51–52)
- Education: MFA Film Production, University of Texas Austin; BA Visual Arts Media, University of California San Diego
- Occupations: Filmmaker, Director, Cinematographer, Producer

PJ Raval is a queer first-generation Filipino-American filmmaker known for his documentary films about underrepresented subcultures and identities within the LGBTQ+ community. Raval is a Guggenheim Fellow, a Robert Giard Fellow, a member of the Producers Guild of America, and the Academy of Motion Picture Art and Sciences. Raval was named one of Filmmaker's 25 New Faces of Independent Film in 2006 and was a featured creator in the 2010 Out 100. Today, he lives in Texas and is an associate professor of the Department of Radio-Television-Film at the Moody College of Communication in the University of Texas at Austin.

== Early life ==
PJ Raval was born on April 15, 1974, in Princeton, New Jersey, but was raised in Clovis, California. Raval lived in San Diego for 10 years, then obtained an MFA in Film and Media Production at the University of Texas at Austin.

== Career ==
In 2008, PJ Raval co-directed the documentary film TRINIDAD: Transgender Frontier with Jay Hodges. TRINIDAD focuses on Dr. Marci Bowers and two of her patients undergoing sex reassignment surgery in Trinidad, Colorado.

Raval's 2013 documentary Before You Know It focuses on the different narratives of three gay seniors. He was inspired to create the work after meeting a group of gay retirees at a screening of TRINIDAD at the Hudson Valley LGBTQ Community Center.

Raval is the director of CALL HER GANDA, a 2018 feature documentary about Jennifer Laude, a Filipina transgender woman from the city of Olongapo murdered by a 19-year-old US marine. The film addresses the topic of transphobia and how transgender individuals are being targeted and eliminated by the Catholic Church and organized religion. In addition to Laude's murder case, the film confronts issues with imperialism, poverty, and the tense relationship between the United States and the Philippines.

Raval centers community voices, including those of activist attorney Virgie Suarez, transgender journalist Meredith Talusan, and Julita Jaude, Jennifer Laude's mother. The film has received dozens of awards and nominations, including winning documentary categories at the 2019 Boston LGBT Film Festival, the 2019 Houston Asian American Pacific Islander Film Festival, the 2018 Inside Out Toronto LGBT Film Festival, 2018 L.A. Outfest, the 2018 New Delhi Film Festival, and the 2020 NLGJA: The Association of LGBTQ Journalists Excellence in Documentary Awards. The production was supported by the Ford Foundation, Arcus, Bertha Foundation, Sundance Film Institute, Fork Films, and the Tribeca Film Institute.

Raval's short films have won many awards, including “Best Narrative Short” at the Chicago Gay and Lesbian Int’l Film Festival, “Best Screenplay” at the Cinematexas Int’l Film Festival, the “Betty Nowlin Award for Excellence in Filmmaking”, and the “Director’s Visionary Award” at the Santa Cruz Film Festival. Raval has also directed music videos for various musical performers and bands, including Wild Beasts, The Sword, and Mistress Stephanie & Her Melodic Cat.

Raval is an associate professor at the Moody College of Communication in the University of Texas at Austin.

== Filmography ==
=== Features ===
Year	Title	Contribution	Notes
2002	The Politics of Fur	Associate Producer	
2003	Girl Wrestler	Additional Camera Operator	
2005	Room	Cinematographer	Won – Woodstock Film Festival Haskell Wexler Award for Best Cinematography
2005	Troop 1500	Cinematographer	
2006	The Cassidy Kids	Cinematographer	
2006	Slam Planet	Additional Camera Operator	
2006	When the Road Bends: Tales of a Gypsy Caravan	Additional Camerawork	
2006	Gretchen	Cinematographer	
2007	The Devil Came on Horseback	Additional Cinematographer	
2008	Trouble the Water	Cinematographer	
2008	Critical condition	Additional Camera	
2008	Dirt	Cinematographer	
2008	Trinidad	Director/Producer/Cinematographer	Won – Cleveland International Film Festival Award for Best Documentary; Nominated – Los Angeles Film Festival Award for Best Documentary
2009	The 2 Bobs	Cinematographer	
2009	Along Came Kinky ... Texas Jewboy for Governor	Camera Operator	
2009	Winnebago Man	Additional Photography	
2009	Sunshine	Additional Cinematography	
2011	Slacker	Director (segment: "Rantings")	Nominated – Sundance Film Festival, Grand Jury Prize Nominated – Film Independent Spirit Awards, Independent Spirit Award
2011	Habibi Rasak Kharban	Cinematographer	
2012	Wonder Women! The Untold Story of American Superheroines	Additional cinematography	
2012	Sunset Stories	Cinematographer	
2012	Foreplay	Cinematographer	
2012	The Bounceback	Cinematographer	
2013	Before You Know It	Director/Producer	Won – Dallas Asian Film Festival Best Documentary; Won – Austin Gay and Lesbian Film Festival Audience Award; Nominated - Austin Film Critics Association Austin Film Award
2018	Call Her Ganda	Director/Producer	Won – Inside Out Toronto Film Festival Award for Best Documentary Won – Los Angeles Asian Pacific Film Festival Grand Jury Prize for Outstanding North American Documentary Feature
2023	Who We Become	Director/Producer	

=== Television work ===
Year	Title	Contribution	Notes
2004-2010	Independent Lens	Camera Operator/Sound	Season 6, Episode 6: "Girl Wrestler"; Season 7, Episode 17: "Troop 1500"; Season 11, Episode 24: "Sunshine"; Season 11, Episode 25: "The Horse Boy"
2008	POV	Camera Operator	Season 21, Episode 9: "Critical Condition"
