= QFest =

LGBTQ film festival in Texas, USA

QFest, formerly known as the Houston Gay & Lesbian Film Festival (HGLFF), is a nonprofit organization based in Houston, Texas, dedicated to promoting the media arts as a tool for communication and cooperation among diverse communities by presenting films, videos, and programs by, about, or of interest to the LGBTQ (Lesbian, Gay, Bisexual, and Transgender) community.

== History of the Houston Gay and Lesbian Film Festival ==
Organizations closely associated with movies helped produce the first HGLFF in 1997. The HGLFF does not use a curator; instead, each venue books its own films from submissions and projects they pursue independently. An advisory board facilitates organization of the films and events – an undertaking that begins almost a year in advance. Striving to make the Festival accessible to the entire population of the greater Houston area, the two-week festival has screenings at Landmark Theatres, Angelika Film Center, The Museum of Fine Arts, Houston, Rice Cinema (at Rice University), DiverseWorks Art Space, and Aurora Picture Show.

The Festival was co-founded by Loris Bradley (formerly of DiverseWorks), Sarah Gish (formerly of Landmark Theatres) and Marian Luntz (still with the Museum of Fine Arts).

The festival was renamed QFest in 2007.

== Outreach and educational programming ==
In addition to showing feature films, documentaries, and short videos, the Festival hosts a series of panel discussions, public forums, and other special events in conjunction with screenings to examine such topics as hate crimes, the media's influence on the perception of LGBT people, and the unique way in which Houston's gay and lesbian community has developed over the last few decades.

== Past screenings ==
TransGeneration (2005) Director: Jeremy Simmons

D.E.B.S. (2004) Director: Angela Robinson

Stupid Boy (Garcon stupide) (2004) Director: Lionel Baier

Pink Flamingos (1972) Director: John Waters

Gypsy 83 (2001) Director: Todd Stephens

Lan Yu (2001) Director: Stanley Kwan

Psycho Beach Party (2000) Director: Robert Lee King

Valley of the Dolls (1966) Director: Mark Robson

== See also ==
- Gulf Coast Archive and Museum – Houston-based LGBT archive
- Houston Gay Pride Parade
- LGBT community of Houston
