= Before You Know It (2013 film) =

2013 American documentary film

- Film poster
- Directed by: PJ Raval
- Produced by: Sara Giustini
- Cinematography: Mike Simpson
- Edited by: Kyle Henry
- Music by: Jimmy LaValle
- Production company: Unraval Films
- Distributed by: The Film Collaborative
- Release date: March 2013 (SXSW)
- Running time: 110 min.
- Country: United States
- Language: English

Before You Know It is a 2013 documentary directed by PJ Raval following the lives of three gay seniors as they navigate the adventures, challenges and surprises of life and love in their golden years. Formerly known lovingly as Untitled Gay Retiree Documentary.

== Synopsis ==
The subjects of Before You Know It are no ordinary senior citizens. They are go-go booted bar-hoppers, love struck activists, troublemaking baton twirlers, late night Internet cruisers, seasoned renegades, and bold adventurers. They are also among the estimated 2.4 million LGBT Americans over the age of 55 in the U.S. many of whom face heightened levels of discrimination, neglect and exclusion. But Before You Know It is not a film about cold statistics, it's a film about generational trailblazers who have surmounted prejudice and defied expectation to form communities of strength, renewal and camaraderie. Before You Know It focuses on the lives of three gay seniors, but reminds us that while LGBT elders face a specific set of issues, aging and its challenges are universal. An affirmation of life and human resilience told with a refreshing humor and candor, Before You Know It confirms that you are never too old to reshape society.

== Festivals ==
The film premiered at South by Southwest 2013 and screened at other film festivals such as Independent Film Festival of Boston, the San Francisco International Film Festival, Maryland Film Festival, Toronto LGBT Film Festival, Edinburgh International Film Festival, Outfest Los Angeles LGBT Film Festival, Asian Film Festival of Dallas, QFest Philadelphia, and QFest Galveston. The film had its national PBS premiere on June 30, 2015. The film received a limited theatrical release through Gathr's on-demand screening platform.
