= TransGeneration =

American documentary-style reality television series

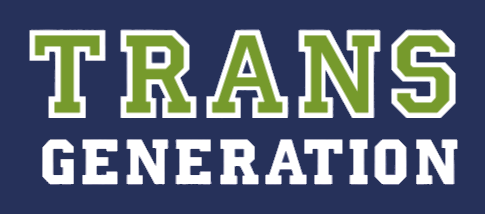
- Genre: Docusoap
- Written by: Mathilde Bittner
- Directed by: Jeremy Simmons
- Starring: Andrea Gabrielle Gibson; Lucas Cheadle; Raci Ignacio; Trent Jackson Jourian
- Composer: David Benjamin Steinberg
- Country of origin: United States
- Original language: English
- No. of seasons: 1
- No. of episodes: 8

Production
- Executive producers: World of Wonder: Fenton Bailey; Randy Barbato; Sundance Channel: Laura Michalchyshyn; Adam Pincus; Logo TV: Lauren Lazin; Eileen Opatut
- Producer: World of Wonder: Thairin Smothers
- Cinematography: Goro Toshima
- Editor: Aleshka Ferrero
- Camera setup: Single-camera
- Running time: 55 minutes (ep. 1); 28 minutes (eps. 2–7); 60 minutes (ep. 8)
- Production company: World of Wonder

Original release
- Network: Sundance Channel
- Release: September 20 – November 8, 2005

TransGeneration is an American documentary-style reality television series that affords a view into the lives of four transgender college students during the 2004–2005 academic year. Two of the students are trans women, and two are trans men. Each of them attends a different school in the United States, and they are each at a different stage of their degree programs. The filmmakers document events in the students' academic careers, their social and family lives, and their transitions.

TransGeneration was commissioned by the Sundance Channel, and produced by World of Wonder. Sundance commissioned the series as part of a concerted effort to vary their programming and revise their image. The inspiration for the show was an article in The New York Times about transgender students at US colleges.

A feature-length preview of the series premiered at the Frameline Film Festival in June 2005, and was screened at numerous other venues before the television debut. The complete, eight-episode series aired on the Sundance Channel from September to November 2005, and on Logo TV from January to February 2006. In Italy it aired on Cult, a satellite television channel. It was released on DVD in the US in March 2006, and on Google Video and iTunes a few months later. That year, TransGeneration won the GLAAD Media Award for Outstanding Documentary, and was a nominee for the IDA Documentary Award in the Limited Series category. The response to the show from critics and other viewers ranged from exuberant to dismissive. In addition, some viewers believed the show had distinct educational value, while others felt that the chosen narratives oversimplified the subject.

A year after taping the series, World of Wonder produced a half-hour reunion show, TransGeneration Reunion. Among World of Wonder's later transgender programs are Sex Change Hospital (2007), Transamerican Love Story (2008), and Becoming Chaz (2011).

== Overview ==
TransGeneration introduces viewers to four transgender college students—two trans women and two trans men—who are each studying at a different college in the United States during the 2004–2005 academic year. The series begins in the autumn of 2004, and concludes with an epilogue in the summer of 2005. Each episode revisits the students at an eventful time in their lives, and concentrates on life events that pertain directly to transgender experience.

The youngest of the four is Raci, a first-year student at a state university near the West Coast of the United States. Gabbie is a second-year student at a public university in the US's Interior West. Lucas is in his final year of undergraduate study at a women's college in the Northeastern US. The eldest of the four, T.J., is a graduate student in the first year of a master's degree program at a state university in the Midwestern US.

=== The students ===
The cast of TransGeneration with the filmmakers Back (L–R): Jeremy Simmons (director), Thairin Smothers (producer), Gabbie Gibson Front (L–R): T.J. Jourian, Lucas Cheadle, Raci Ignacio

Raci "Raycee" Ignacio
Raci was born on February 5, 1985, in the Philippines. She attends California State University, Los Angeles on a merit-based scholarship, and must maintain a GPA of at least 3.5. She moved to the United States at the age of 15, and she is now beginning her university studies in history with a pre-law option. Raci is on hormone replacement therapy (HRT). She wants to be seen as normal girl, and is reluctant to reveal that she is a trans woman. She is also poor and hearing-impaired; she speaks English as a second language, and she is living away from her mother for the first time. Raci and her aunt rent a small room in Eastside Los Angeles.
Andrea Gabrielle "Gabbie" Gibson
19-year-old Gabbie was born on April 22, 1985, in Redlands, California. She is a sophomore at the University of Colorado at Boulder, where she majors in computer science. She started HRT in February 2004, and since then has lived full-time as a woman. She is a resident assistant in a dormitory. Because of their community restroom policy, the university assigned Gabbie a private room with attached bath. She has become active in LGBT student activities, and anticipates her upcoming genital reassignment surgery. Gabbie is candid with others about being trans, but she wants to be understood as a person with more to her identity than her gender.
Lucas Cheadle
Lucas was born on November 3, 1982, in Oklahoma. He attends Smith College, a private, women-only college in Massachusetts. Lucas is a neuroscience major in his senior year; he has fought for transgender rights for his entire college career. He has not yet started hormone replacement therapy, and is cautious about it. Lucas' parents are divorced; his mother and brother know that he is trans, but his father does not. Lucas plays guitar in a punk band, and lives in an apartment with his friend Kasey, a trans man who has been on HRT for eight months.
Trent Jackson "T.J." Jourian
T.J. was born on June 6, 1981, in Beirut, Lebanon. He is of Armenian descent; he grew up in Cyprus, and came to the US for the first time in 1999. He is a Fulbright Scholar pursuing a master's degree in student affairs administration at Michigan State University. Outgoing and involved, T.J. is active in several student organizations pertaining to performance art, gender, and social change. He lives with other students in a housing cooperative. His mother lives in a close-knit Armenian community in Cyprus, where the news would surely travel if T.J. transitions. Because his mother opposes his transition, and because he must return to Cyprus for two years due to a travel visa requirement, he has not yet started HRT.

== Episodes ==
No.	Title	Running time	Original Air Date (Sundance)	Airdate (Logo TV)
1	"Episode 1"	55 minutes	September 20, 2005	January 9, 2006
Gabbie likes anime and video games. With her new energy and confidence, she wants to make friends and find someone. Her parents agree to pay for her sex reassignment surgery (SRS). After more than three years leading a transgender awareness and activist group on campus, Lucas feels overwhelmed and resigns. He decides its time to start taking testosterone, and his bandmate Zach reassures him. Without her scholarship, Raci cannot afford to attend university. To keep it, she must maintain excellent grades despite hearing impairment, a difficult living arrangement, and very little money. She often feels self-conscious in public; even more so when she's with trans friends. T.J. organizes a political stage production, which is well-received. He participates in several student affairs groups. He is upset when another activist, Andy, stages protests that T.J. feels are unproductive and poorly conceived.
2	"Episode 2"	28 minutes	September 27, 2005	January 16, 2006
Lucas visits his mother and brother in Oklahoma. After three years, his mother is still processing the change. Since T.J.'s student visa prevents him from taking testosterone yet, he expresses himself artistically by performing in a drag king troupe. Gabbie volunteers to work at the university's GLBT center. Since Raci can't afford a prescription for female hormones, she buys them on the street—except her sources have vanished.
3	"Episode 3"	28 minutes	October 4, 2005	January 23, 2006
Gabbie thinks obsessively about her surgery; she has a new friend, Cate, who started HRT at about the same time as her. Lucas researches the effects of testosterone therapy, and T.J. co-founds a support group for trans men. Lucas writes a difficult letter to his father, and T.J. to his mother, each reaffirming their transgender identities. With her mother away, Raci goes clubbing at night; when Raci visits her mother in San Francisco, she gets an earful of criticism.
4	"Episode 4"	28 minutes	October 11, 2005	January 30, 2006
Gabbie flies home to visit her grandparents, and they attend a Presbyterian church service. T.J.'s mother's refusal to accept and support him takes a toll on him. Raci attends her wealthy cousin's birthday party, and envies her. Lucas gets his first testosterone shot, and his friends give him a "T" party.
5	"Episode 5"	28 minutes	October 18, 2005	February 6, 2006
Gabbie goes to an LGBTQ party, and later to a seminar on SRS for trans women. T.J. spends time with his girlfriend, Staci. Lucas confronts the dean about Smith's decision to restrict filming. Raci withdraws her campus housing application for fear of transphobic students; meanwhile, she is missing a lot of classes.
6	"Episode 6"	28 minutes	October 25, 2005	February 13, 2006
Lucas' friend Kasey gets male chest reconstruction surgery. Raci comes out at an LGBT student meeting. T.J. meets his girlfriend's parents. Gabbie's friend Cate has an orchiectomy, but Gabbie decides not to accompany her to the hospital.
7	"Episode 7"	28 minutes	November 1, 2005	February 20, 2006
Raci gets help from the Los Angeles LGBT Center, and goes on a bike outing with other transgender people. Kasey has been helping Lucas track his progress on testosterone; after three months of hormones, Lucas' family sees him for the first time post-HRT. T.J. prepares to visit his mother in Cyprus, which means leaving Staci behind. Gabbie's family gives her a dinner party the day before she goes to Trinidad, Colorado for sex reassignment surgery.
8	"Episode 8"	60 minutes	November 8, 2005	February 27, 2006
The academic year draws to a close. Lucas graduates and parts ways with his roommates. His family visits for his graduation ceremony, and his father begins to accept that he has a son. Gabbie undergoes SRS, celebrates her birthday with her family, and moves out of her dormitory. Raci concludes her studies for the academic year, and goes to a free clinic for hormones and test results. Her friend Apple has graduated, and they both march in the Los Angeles Pride parade. T.J. returns to Nicosia, Cyprus for a week, and his mother refuses to acknowledge his gender. The episode concludes with an epilogue from the summer of 2005.

=== TransGeneration Reunion ===
In the spring of 2006, after TransGeneration was nominated for a GLAAD Media Award, the filmmakers gathered the four students in Los Angeles, where they taped a reunion show and attended the awards ceremony.

Title	Running time	Directed by	Written by	Original release date
TransGeneration Reunion	29 minutes	Jeremy Simmons	Afsheen Family	August 27, 2006
One year later, we find that Raci is engaged to be married; Lucas lives in his home state of Oklahoma; T.J. plans to return to Cyprus; and Gabbie continues to enjoy her new life.

== Development ==
The idea for TransGeneration came in 2004. Lawyer and journalist Fred Bernstein had written an article about transgender students at US colleges and universities. The New York Times published the piece in March; some Sundance Channel staffers (including Adam Pincus, senior vice president of original programming) read it, and saw potential for a documentary series. The idea got executive approval, and Sundance commissioned World of Wonder Productions to make the series.

The Sundance Channel, which was partially owned by media conglomerate Viacom, divided TransGeneration's production cost with Logo TV, an LGBT-themed cable channel that Viacom was preparing to launch. Sundance assumed most of the cost. The companies planned for Sundance to air the show first, followed by Logo several months later. One reason why they aired the series on both channels was because Sundance and Logo had distinct target audiences.

TransGeneration was produced at a time when the Sundance Channel was actively working to expand their library of original programming, to outsource production, and to foster a public image as a channel for independent thinking. Sundance's research concluded that their viewers wanted a broader range of programming, and that their viewers were more likely to consider themselves "independent thinkers" than "independent film fanatics". Later that year, the channel premiered two new and original series: TransGeneration in September, and Iconoclasts in November.

== Production ==
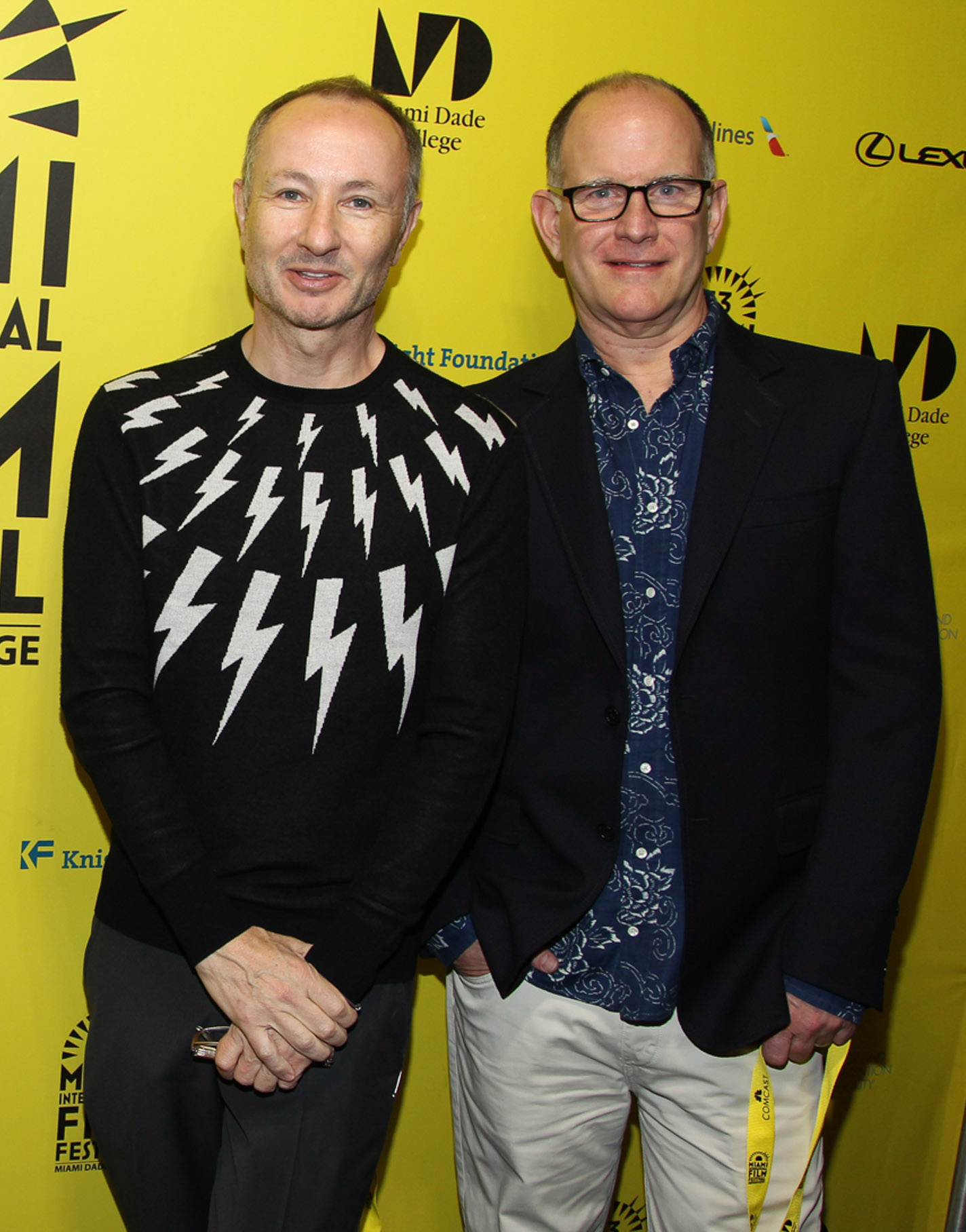
Executive producers Fenton Bailey and Randy Barbato

World of Wonder founders Fenton Bailey and Randy Barbato served as executive producers. Adam Pincus was the initial executive producer for the Sundance Channel, later joined by Laura Michalchyshyn; Lauren Lazin and Eileen Opatut were executive producers for Logo. The producer was Thairin Smothers of World of Wonder, and Ashley York of Sundance was a segment producer. The director and supervising producer was Jeremy Simmons, who had previously directed the 2003 documentary Gay Hollywood for World of Wonder.

To cast the series, Jeremy Simmons and Thairin Smothers posted to LGBT Internet forums and electronic mailing lists, and visited college campuses. In August 2004 they traveled around the country to meet the shortlisted candidates. Smothers said that their main casting goal was diversity. Diverse representation was also important to T.J. Jourian, one of the four students cast for the show: "What pushed me to do it was the idea of showing trans people of color, pushing beyond the American image of a gay white man." "I didn’t want to be in anything where I was representing the whole community.… What I want to do is just give another example of a way to be."

The film crew recorded the students on campus, at home, with their friends and families, at medical appointments, and at transgender-related events. Some footage was recorded by the students themselves. In February 2005, the administration at Smith College prohibited the crew from continuing to film one of the documentary's subjects, Lucas Cheadle, on campus (except in his apartment). Cheadle asked the dean of students to reconsider, but his appeal was denied. Smith College has received considerable media attention about questions regarding transgender students.

== Marketing ==
When the Sundance Channel decided to broadcast more original programs, they also planned to support those programs with integrated marketing campaigns. In the months leading up to TransGeneration's TV premiere, Sundance promoted the series across a range of media, including advertisements and mentions in several gay and lesbian magazines; posters; television ads on the Sundance Channel, NBC, and VH1 (all of which are properties of the corporate stakeholders, Viacom and NBCUniversal); preview screenings at more than 150 LGBT events; a billboard in Los Angeles; and MTA bus advertisements in New York (one of which wound up in the background of a scene in The Devil Wears Prada).

=== Broadcasts, releases, and screenings ===
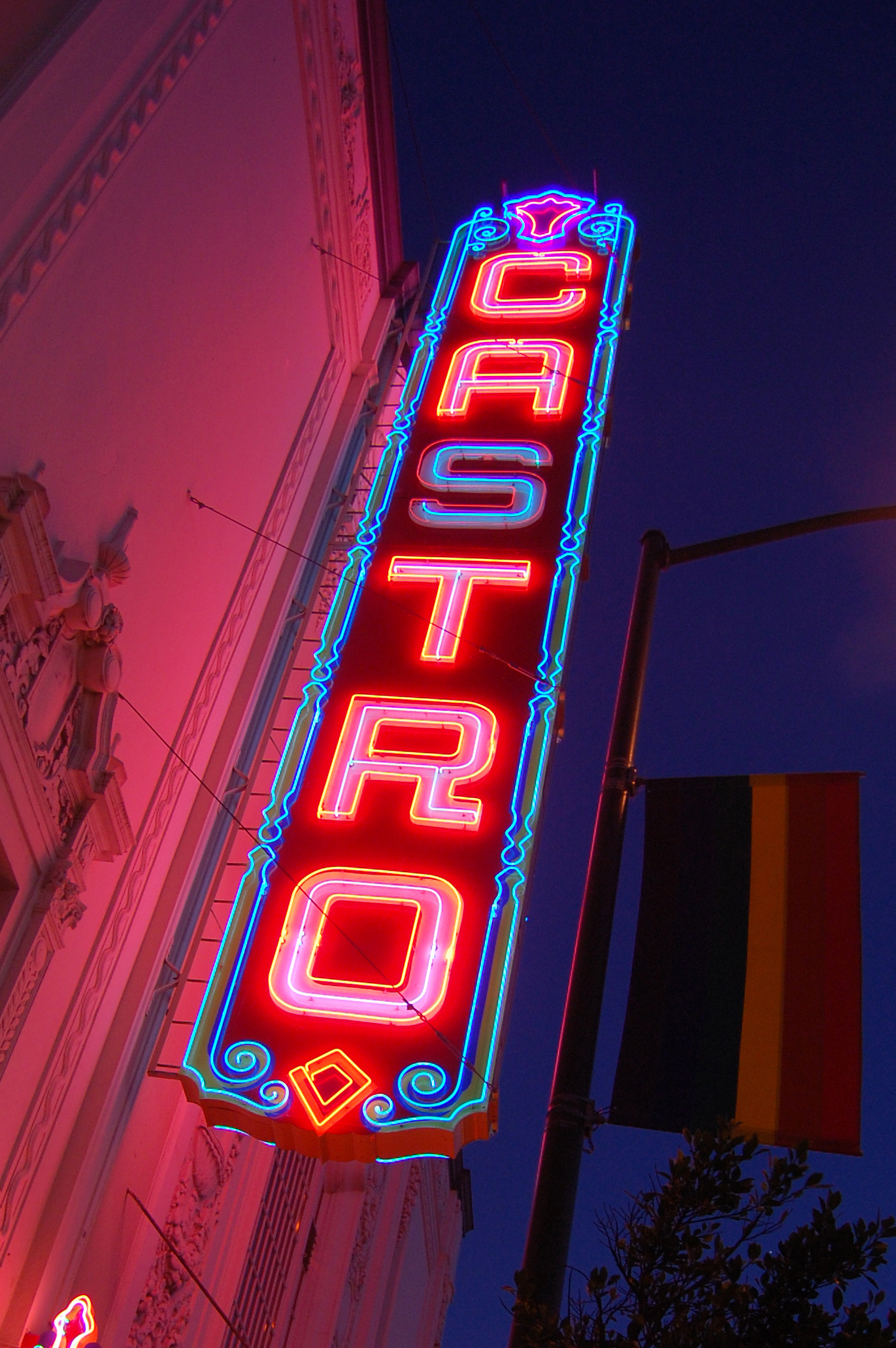
TransGeneration premiered at the Castro Theatre on the seventh night of the Frameline Film Festival in June 2005.

For preview screenings, the series was edited to an 83-minute feature film. The global premiere of the film version was on June 23, 2005, at the Castro Theatre in San Francisco, for the 29th Frameline Film Festival. This was the first occasion on which the four students were able to meet. After the screening, the audience greeted director Jeremy Simmons and producer Thairin Smothers with a standing ovation. A second standing ovation followed as Gabbie, T.J., Lucas, and Raci walked to the stage.

Screenings at more film festivals followed, including Outfest in July; the Gay Orlando Film Festival and the North Carolina Gay & Lesbian Film Festival in August; and the Connecticut Gay and Lesbian Film Festival, the Houston Gay and Lesbian Film Festival, and the Austin Gay and Lesbian International Film Festival in September. At the North Carolina Gay & Lesbian Film Festival, T.J. Jourian was on hand to answer questions.

Of the approximately 150 preview screenings before the television premiere, most were at US colleges and universities. Among these were the University of California, Berkeley, the University of Georgia, Depauw University, Boise State University, and the University of North Carolina at Wilmington. Some off-campus screenings were organised in collaboration with LGBT groups, such as the San Francisco LGBT Community Center and the United Gays and Lesbians of Wyoming.

In advance of the television debut, PlanetOut Video streamed the first episode via Gay.com and PlanetOut.com. The series aired on the Sundance Channel from September 20 to November 8, 2005, and on Logo TV from January 9 to February 27, 2006. Both channels gave it an evening time slot. The Sundance Channel reran the series in May 2012, followed by a marathon in June. In Italy, it was syndicated by the satellite television channel Cult in 2006.

New Video Group released TransGeneration on DVD in the US on March 28, 2006, under their Docurama imprint. The two-disc DVD set includes about 19 minutes of deleted scenes. In the summer of 2006, the Sundance Channel also made the series available to rent or buy through Google Video, and later marketed it on iTunes.

== Reception ==
=== Before the television premiere ===
After Robert Koehler of Variety previewed the screener edit of the series at the Outfest film festival, he wrote: "What would have been spectacular stuff just 10 years ago is now something closer to a high-quality Oprah special, humanizing in rather simplistic terms complex lives…". Anthony Glassman of the Gay People's Chronicle was also cautious in his assessment: "The word 'groundbreaking' should be used sparingly, and perhaps it does not apply here. TransGeneration does one thing, and it does it well. It shows the viewer the reality and normality of the lives of these students and those around them, their family and friends."

Billy Curtis, director of the Gender Equity Resource Center at UC Berkeley, was deeply moved by the preview; but he also looked at it from a practical perspective: "I knew immediately I could use it as an educational tool for faculty, staff, administration and students.… It doesn't try to represent the entire trans experience, but it… answers some of the most basic questions about what it means to be trans while being this great conversation starter."

Roger Moore, film critic for the Orlando Sentinel, described the students as "sexually inexperienced… unhappy… laughably naive kids". Meanwhile, columnist Mike S. Adams told Townhall readers that he would attend the UNC Wilmington screening, and listed taunting questions he said he would ask.

Joanna Weiss of The Boston Globe labeled the series one of the highlights of reality television in 2005. She elaborates: "What's radical here isn't the topic so much as the way it's handled with maturity and respect at a time when every personal issue seems fodder for a leering TV treatment. TransGeneration is provocative, yes, but only in the sense that it's straightforward, unflinching, and, in the end, wholly unsensational."

=== After the television premiere ===
The Sundance Channel airings attracted more viewers in the 18-to-24 age range than was usual for their audience, which typically comprised men over age 25. After the second episode aired, cultural critic Lee Siegel wrote about the show for The New Republic. He pontificated on transgender experience, and characterized the story as a unique form of drama or tragedy. In his introduction, he commented on the general absence of reviews for the show in major news publications.

Bloggers Joey Guerra (AfterElton) and Jay Cheel (The Documentary Blog) found Gabbie, Raci, Lucas, and T.J. fascinating and their stories engrossing. Guerra called the show "addictive… not only because of sharp storytelling but because of the students' fully realized personalities." Cheel described the students as "intelligent, articulate and passionate in everything they do". Similarly, on DVD Talk, David Cornelius gushed with praise. He was impressed by the ways in which the series interwove stories, and presented some themes as a study in contrasts: Gabbie's economic privilege compared with Raci's financial struggles; Lucas and T.J.'s struggle for rights and recognition.

In a 2005 essay published in the online journal Flow, Shana Agid, guest faculty at Sarah Lawrence College, wondered whether programs like TransGeneration "take away from other possibilities for change" if—in an effort to make queer subject matter "straight-friendly" and "consumable"—they only represent transgender people who fit a certain narrative and adhere to a gender binary. Like Agid, Todd Ramlow of PopMatters lamented the production's fixation on binary gender, but he found positive qualities in its presentation of some of the struggles and anxieties a transgender person might experience. "It prods us to think seriously about transgender issues, and to… create more inclusive communities." In his final analysis, he gave the series three stars out of ten.

K. Nicole Hladky (2013) identifies four themes in the series: process (the various dimensions of transition); intersection (of transgender with race, class, age, nationality, etc.); stigma (borne by transgender people); and prescription, in which the documentary perspective of TransGeneration prefers or endorses "particular views of transgenderism and approaches to transition". Hladky concludes that "[al]though the series does present a number of the complexities surrounding transgenderism, it nonetheless limits transgender individuals by the prescriptive view of transition it reinforces".

In an essay published in the collection Trans Bodies, Trans Selves (2014), Pearlman et al. quote a viewer who called TransGeneration "the only positive [transgender] documentary or film that I've seen. The others—Boys Don't Cry [1999], Soldier's Girl [2003], etc.—are all depressing."

==== Awards and nominations ====
At the 17th GLAAD Media Awards in April 2006, TransGeneration won the GLAAD Media Award for Outstanding Documentary. The other nominees in the category were Middle Sexes: Redefining He and She, Same Sex America, We Are Dad, and the "Kinsey" episode of American Experience.

Sisters Alexis, Patricia, and Rosanna Arquette announced the nominees, and Alexis Arquette (who is herself a transgender woman) presented the award. Gabbie, Lucas, Raci, and T.J.—along with filmmakers Jeremy Simmons and Thairin Smothers—took the stage to receive the award. T.J. also took the opportunity to deliver a marriage proposal to his girlfriend, Staci Gunner. When Gunner came onstage to accept, the audience responded with a standing ovation.

In October 2006, the International Documentary Association nominated TransGeneration for an IDA Documentary Award in the "Limited Series" category. The award went to Brent and Craig Renaud's Off to War, a miniseries about citizen soldiers in the Arkansas National Guard, who are deployed overseas as part of the military occupation of Iraq. Other nominees in the category were China Rises, The Drug Years, and RX for Survival: A Global Health Challenge.

== Legacy ==
TransGeneration was "one of the very first media stories about transgender youth" in the United States. Although it was discussed by scholars, its television premiere was largely ignored by major news publications.

In February 2006, during the interim between the show's GLAAD Media Award nomination and the awards ceremony, T.J. Jourian was interviewed by Larry King on the CNN talk show Larry King Live, along with trans man Aiden Key; trans women Brenda Chevis and Jennifer Finney Boylan; sexologist Michelle Angello; and Felicity Huffman, star of the 2005 film Transamerica. Jourian talked about his past, cultural barriers to acceptance, and what it means to be a trans man. The interviews were parodied in a comedy sketch on the March 4 episode of Saturday Night Live, in which Natalie Portman played Jourian. T.J. Jourian has since become a speaker and consultant concerned with the needs and interests of students, queer and transgender people, and people of color.

In the spring of 2006, Bonnie Miller Rubin of the Chicago Tribune described TransGeneration as a pop-culture vehicle that "helped trans issues gain more visibility". The show inspired writer/actor Megan McTavish to create a transgender character for All My Children, a US soap opera for which she was the head writer. "I found [the transgender students'] experiences so moving that I started thinking along those lines," she said. The character she created, Zoe, was introduced in 2006, and was played by Jeffrey Carlson.

World of Wonder's next reality television show with a transgender theme was Sex Change Hospital in 2007, followed by Transamerican Love Story in 2008. Sex Change Hospital focuses on the patients and medical practice of Marci Bowers, the OB/GYN who performed Gabbie's genital reassignment surgery.

== See also ==
- My Transsexual Summer (2011)
- Sex Change Hospital (2007)
- List of transgender-related topics
- Media portrayals of transgender people
- Intersectionality
- Passing (gender)
- Transgender rights
