= Gulf Coast Archive and Museum =

Archive and museum

Gulf Coast Archive and Museum of GLBT History, Inc.
- Established: July 1999
- Location: 6019 South Loop East 77033 Houston, TX (former: 401 Branard, Houston, Texas, USA)
- Coordinates: 29.737095°N 95.384532°W
- Chairperson: Craig Farrell
- Curator: Judy Reeves
- Website: gcam.org

The Gulf Coast Archive and Museum of Gay, Lesbian, Bisexual and Transgender History, Inc. (GCAM) is an LGBT history organization located in Houston. It was previously in Neartown.

GCAM was created to collect, preserve and provide access to historical items from the LGBT community of the Gulf Coast area of Texas. The archive encourages education of and research by anyone interested in learning about any aspects of the LGBT community. The organization sponsors meetings for the dissemination of information and display of collected materials.

== History ==
GCAM began meeting in July 1999 and officially incorporated in May 2000. The initial opening of the museum doors occurred Friday, June 16, 2000, in a small shared warehouse space on Capitol Street. By June 2001, the museum had moved into an apartment on West Main Street. In May 2005, GCAM officially closed its museum to focus on preserving the history of the community. Later, GCAM moved into an office at the Montrose Center with an ongoing exhibit space there on the public walls of the space.

As of 2019 the organization's archives are available for viewing by appointment. The museum is now closed.

== Exhibits ==
June through September 2004, GCAM was proud to be able to assist the Holocaust Museum Houston to present Nazi Persecution of Homosexuals 1933–1945.

== See also ==
- ONE National Gay & Lesbian Archives – LGBT Archive based in Los Angeles
- Houston Gay and Lesbian Film Festival
- LGBT rights in Texas
