= Transamerican Love Story =

2008 American television series

- Genre: Dating game show; Reality television
- Directed by: Julio Kollerbohm
- Presented by: Alec Mapa
- Starring: Calpernia Addams; Andrea James
- Theme music composer: Kevin Haskins
- Country of origin: United States
- Original language: English
- No. of seasons: 1
- No. of episodes: 8

Production
- Executive producers: World of Wonder: Fenton Bailey; Randy Barbato; Tom Campbell; Oh Really! Productions: Joe del Hierro
- Producer: Sara Jandrain (senior producer)
- Cinematography: Brian Stevens
- Editors: Jason Blum; Ben Levine; Tom Sitter; Edwin Steinitz
- Camera setup: Multi-camera
- Production companies: World of Wonder; Oh Really! Productions

Original release
- Network: Logo TV
- Release: February 11 – March 31, 2008

Transamerican Love Story is an American reality dating show in which suitors woo transgender woman Calpernia Addams. Addams chooses a suitor by process of elimination. When the show first aired, viewers could vote their preferences online, but it was Addams who chose whom to eliminate. Calpernia is accompanied by her friend Andrea James; each episode is hosted by comedian Alec Mapa.

Transamerican Love Story is the first reality dating show in the United States in which contestants compete for the attention and approval of a transgender woman. Logo TV, a digital cable channel with LGBTQ content, announced the series in November 2007, and premiered the first episode the following February. The series finale aired on March 31, 2008.

Zack Rosen of the Washington Blade praised the series, describing it as "refreshing for its lack of sensationalism". Heather Havrilesky of Salon agreed, and admired Calpernia's composure in the reality show environment. In 2009, Transamerican Love Story won a GLAAD Media Award in the "Outstanding Reality Program" category, tying with I Want to Work for Diddy.

MTV Networks published the complete series on DVD in 2009. The series is also distributed on Prime Video, and was previously distributed through Netflix, iTunes, and LOGOonline.

== Overview ==
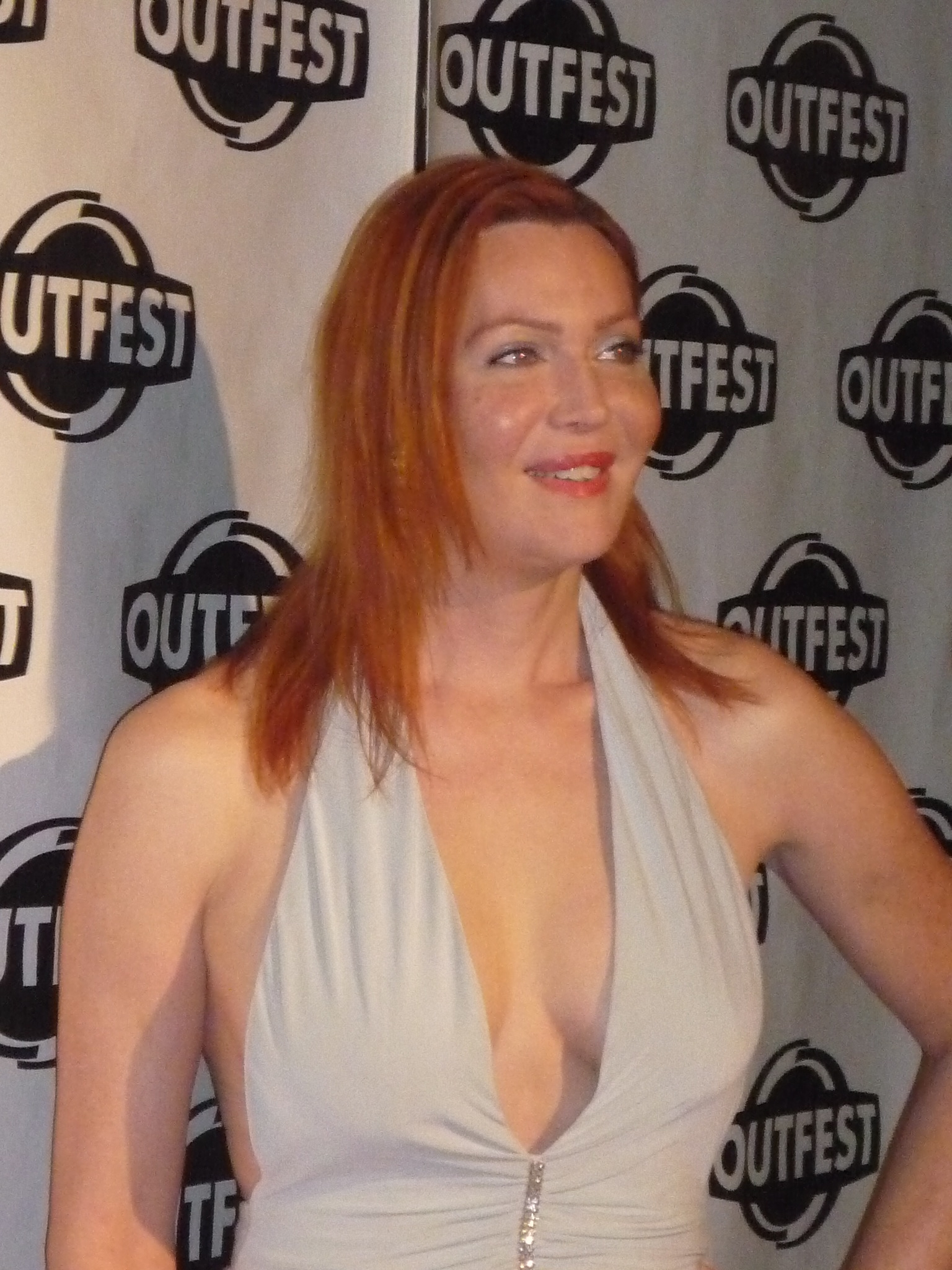
Calpernia Addams,
the bachelorette

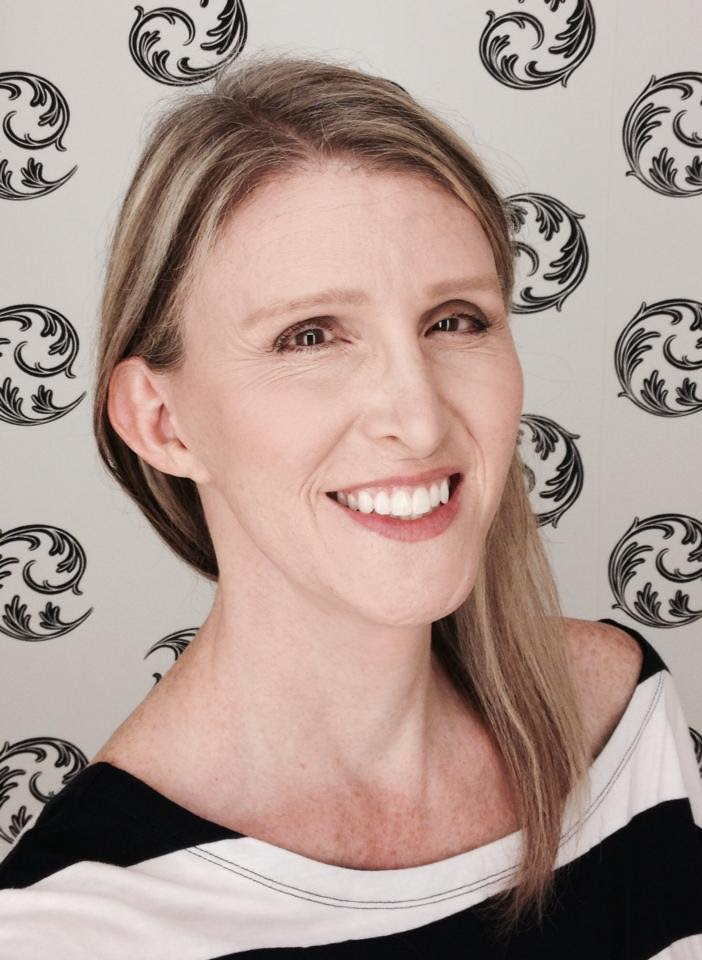
Andrea James,
Calpernia's friend

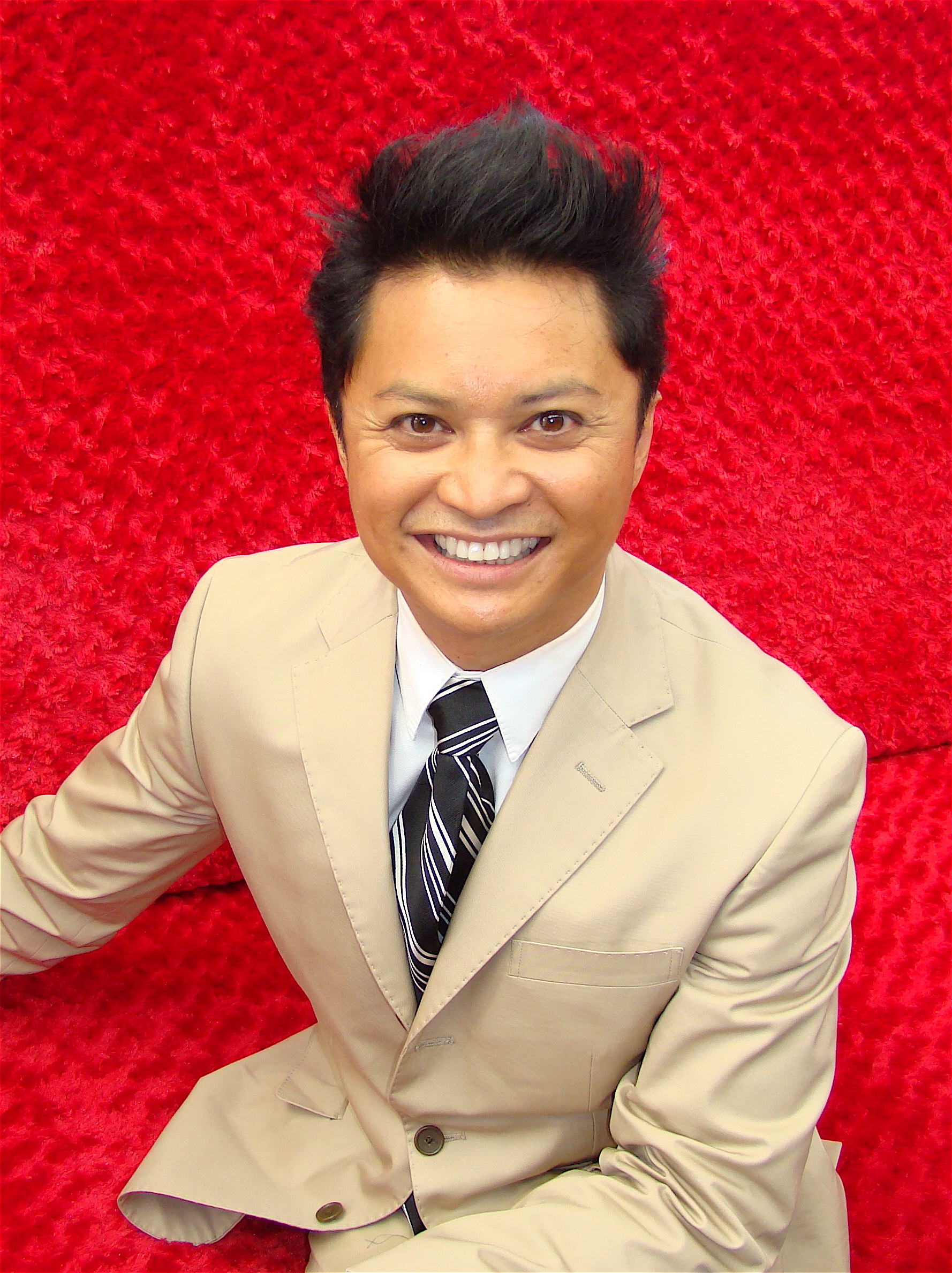
Alec Mapa,
the show's host

The show employs the competition-dating format established by ABC's The Bachelor (2002), a long-running series with numerous spin-offs and imitators—including ABC's own spin-off, The Bachelorette (2003). In Transamerican Love Story, the bachelorette is Calpernia Addams, an American actress and musician. The bachelors are eight men who say they are "open to dating a trans woman". The bachelors lodge together in a mansion, while Calpernia stays in a separate cottage on the estate. The contestants compete in group challenges, and the winners are granted time with Calpernia.

Before deciding which contestant to eliminate in the evening's ceremony, Calpernia confers with her friends Andrea James and (show host) Alec Mapa. James and Mapa have occasion to chat with the bachelors, and they share some of their insights with Calpernia. Viewers also vote their preferences online, but it is Calpernia who chooses whom to eliminate. In the elimination ceremony, Calpernia feeds a chocolate to those suitors whom she invites to stay. In the final episode, when only three suitors remain, they are given makeovers before Calpernia meets with them individually to tell each man whether it is him she has chosen.

Most of Transamerican Love Story was filmed in the Greater Los Angeles Area of Los Angeles County, California. Portions of episode six were filmed in Ventura, California (a coastal city northwest of Los Angeles) and Las Vegas, Nevada.

=== The suitors ===
Eight men compete in the show. They range in age from 24 to 47. Two of the suitors are in their twenties, four are (like Calpernia) in their thirties, and two are in their forties.

The eight suitors
Name	Age	Hometown	Job
Barry	45	Glade Hill, Virginia	Actor
Blaine	47	Reseda, California	Car salesman
Jim	32	Hilliard, Ohio	Writer
Mark	34	New York, New York	Professional wrestler
Mike	24	Chicago, Illinois	Personal trainer
Peter	25	Encino, California	Media consultant
Rich	37	New York, New York	Yoga instructor
Shawn	33	Ventura, California	Concert promoter

== Episodes ==
No.	Title	Original release date
1	"Getting to Know You"	February 11, 2008
Calpernia arrives in a horse-drawn carriage and meets the eight bachelors. Each man spends a few minutes talking with her while the rest talk with her friend Andrea. Later that night, the men are invited to a "sleepover" with a Middle Eastern theme: the men dress in thongs and loincloths, and must cater to Calpernia by fanning her, feeding her tidbits, rubbing her feet, and dancing. Calpernia decides to eliminate Blaine, who previously revealed that he had owned a transsexual porn business.
2	"Something's Cookin'"	February 18, 2008
Since Calpernia is from the Southern United States, her friends are invited to a Southern dinner—which the bachelors must prepare. The men shop at a nearby kosher market, and make kosher substitutions for the non-kosher ingredients that the recipes call. At first the men get along while preparing the meal but things become more strained as the cooking progresses. Barry, having taken control of the cooking and organizing the men, earns a wine-and-cheese date with Calpernia that afternoon. The dinner guests arrive and find that some of the dishes are not well-prepared. The dinner party ends with a singalong led by Shawn. Shawn wins a few moments with Calpernia based on her friends' recommendations. Jim reveals to Mark that he is transgender, and is pleasantly surprised by Mark's encouraging response. At the elimination, Calpernia sends Barry home.
3	"Love's a Beach"	February 25, 2008
The six remaining suitors arrive at a beach where they must strip to their underpants and exercise under the orders of a former drill sergeant (who is also a trans man). Calpernia and Andrea watch through binoculars from a nearby yacht. The drill sergeant pairs the men into teams, and explains that each team is to paddle a rubber raft to the yacht. The men who win the race earn time alone with Calpernia. Shawn and Rich win the race, and take the opportunity to get to know Calpernia better. Back on shore, Mark clashes with the other men, particularly Mike. The next day, Calpernia visits to spend some alone time with Mark. Peter (who's worried about having had no alone time with her) and Mike crash the end of their date. Jim tells all of the remaining suitors that he is transgender, and they are all supportive. At the elimination ceremony, Calpernia eliminates Rich, saying they would make better friends.
4	"I Love the Nightlife"	March 3, 2008
Mark continues to come into conflict with the other suitors. Calpernia brings the men to a nightclub where several of her friends (including original club kid James St. James) evaluate them. Calpernia performs her song "Stunning", and the men learn they will perform on stage and in costume for her and a panel of judges. Mark refuses, but eventually agrees to perform in his street clothes. Mike wins the performance competition, and earns a ride in a limousine with Calpernia. The next day Calpernia finally spends some time alone with Peter, but she's concerned that he's more interested in the mint juleps she's serving than in her. Calpernia eliminates Peter at that night's ceremony.
5	"I Like the Way You Move"	March 10, 2008
The episode begins with group interactions between the remaining four suitors. Everyone goes to Oil Can Harry's in Studio City to learn to dance the country-western two-step. Afterward, they return to the mansion for a barbecue dinner. The dinner becomes a shouting match between Mark and Jim, and Calpernia breaks down in tears. Calpernia eliminates Mark at that evening's ceremony, and Shawn leaves the mansion to attend a funeral.
6	"Meet the Folks"	March 17, 2008
This episode stresses the importance of family. With Shawn absent for a funeral, only Jim and Mike are left to meet Calpernia's "adopted mother", Chyna. Calpernia and Mike go to the Las Vegas Strip, where Mike's mother and father are on holiday at the Sahara Hotel and Casino. Shawn returns, and Calpernia accompanies him to his hometown, Ventura, California. Jim's parents visit the mansion to meet Calpernia, as do his former roommates, a gay couple. At the elimination ceremony, Jim and Shawn are invited to stay, but Calpernia decides not to eliminate Mike, either. Calpernia announces that all four of them are returning to the mansion for the final phase of the competition.
7	"Season Recap"	March 24, 2008
In this clip show, host Alec Mapa recaps the series so far, and interviews Calpernia and the remaining suitors.
8	"Season Finale"	March 31, 2008
Calpernia and the three remaining suitors move to Le Parc Suite Hotel in West Hollywood, and the suitors get makeovers at Fusion Hair. Calpernia calls Jim to the hotel's rooftop patio and tells him that they should not be "romantic partners". Mike and Shawn each make their final pitch for Calpernia's heart, and in the end she selects Shawn.

== Competition results ==
The suitors undergo six rounds of elimination. Most episodes conclude with the elimination of one suitor; by the final episode, three suitors remain.

The table below lists contestants in the order in which Calpernia calls their names during the elimination ceremony. In episode five, no competition winner is declared. In episode six, each of the three remaining men gets a date with Calpernia. Episode seven is a clip show, and has no elimination ceremony. In episode eight, Calpernia turns down two of the three remaining suitors before declaring the remaining man the winner.

Call-out order of the contestants
No. of contestants	Episode							
No. of contestants	1	2	3	4	5	6	7	8
1	Rich	Shawn	Mike	Jim	Shawn	Shawn	—N/a	Shawn
2	Jim	Jim	Shawn	Mike	Mike	Jim	—N/a	Mike
3	Peter	Rich	Mark	Shawn	Jim	Mike	—N/a	Jim
4	Mike	Mark	Jim	Mark	Mark			
5	Barry	Peter	Peter	Peter				
6	Shawn	Mike	Rich					
7	Mark	Barry						
8	Blaine							

The contestant won the competition.
The contestant won a date with Calpernia.
The contestant won a date with Calpernia, but was eliminated.
The contestant was eliminated.
The contestant was to be eliminated, but Calpernia let him stay.

=== Summary of the final result ===
In episode eight, Calpernia chooses Shawn over the other two remaining suitors.

Name	Age	Hometown	Job	Eliminated
Shawn	33	Ventura, California	Concert promoter	Winner
Mike	24	Chicago, Illinois	Personal trainer	Episode 8
Jim	32	Hilliard, Ohio	Writer	Episode 8
Mark	34	New York, New York	Professional wrestler	Episode 5
Peter	25	Encino, California	Media consultant	Episode 4
Rich	37	New York, New York	Yoga instructor	Episode 3
Barry	45	Glade Hill, Virginia	Actor	Episode 2
Blaine	47	Reseda, California	Car salesman	Episode 1

== Production ==
Transamerican Love Story was one of three new reality television shows that Logo premiered in 2008, accompanied by Gimme Sugar and Shirts & Skins. It was produced by World of Wonder Productions with the assistance of Oh Really! Productions, a company that had recently begun producing The Big Gay Sketch Show for Logo.

After World of Wonder developed the concept for Transamerican Love Story, Logo called Calpernia Addams in the summer of 2007 to offer her the starring role, which she accepted. Addams is an actress, musician, writer, and activist from Nashville, Tennessee. She was 36 years old when the show was filmed.

Her friend, transgender activist Andrea James, co-stars in the series, and was a consulting producer. In a 2013 interview, James explains that she saw an opportunity for social progress in a program that accurately represented men who are attracted to trans women. Typically, she says, in US media trans-attracted men are stigmatized and shamed, and that can make them hate themselves—and "lead to unhealthy and even dangerous situations for trans women." "No one knows how hard it is for us to date!" Addams adds. Both Addams and James hoped the show would also undermine the media stereotype of trans women as "tragic and serious".

Transamerican Love Story was not World of Wonder's first transgender program. Their documentary series TransGeneration (2005) won a GLAAD Media Award for Outstanding Documentary in 2006, and Sex Change Hospital (2007) was a nominee for the same award in 2009. Transamerican Love Story contestant Jim Howley, who is himself transgender, appeared in the premiere episode of Sex Change Hospital.

== Response and epilogue ==
Zack Rosen of the Washington Blade called the show "refreshing for its lack of sensationalism". Heather Havrilesky, in her review for Salon, observed: "The show’s producers (thankfully) resist the urge to throw in big, manipulative Fox-style surprises. While some of the men get freaked out by each other, Calpernia is likable and accepting and takes the whole crazy assortment of characters in stride."

"A reality dating show is … a very difficult circumstance in which to get to know someone", wrote Calpernia Addams, a few weeks after the finale aired. "I look at it as … a fun romp … rather than a deadly serious path to matrimony." The following July, Calpernia reported that she and competition-winner Shawn "had some dinners and get-togethers, but … have not continued to date". A few days later, she told an interviewer: "The amazing thing that Logo did with this was they showed trans people dating as being so normal, like it really is. I think it’s going to open it up for trans women to feel worthy of love and for guys to not be afraid to date us."

About two months after the final episode aired, Addams, Howley, Andrea James, and Alec Mapa all appeared together in the 2008 Los Angeles Pride parade. Later that summer, Jim Howley did a photo shoot with portrait photographer Eric Schwabel for a feature in The Advocate on the human body. Schwabel also photographed Addams the following February.

On June 18, 2009, a few weeks after Transamerican Love Story won a GLAAD Media Award for Outstanding Reality Program, Calpernia Addams and Andrea James debuted a short comedy film at the 33rd Frameline Film Festival in San Francisco. They had begun developing the film—called Transproofed—more than a year prior. Transproofed is the story of a trans woman, Ava, who feels unready to tell the man she's been dating that she's transgender; but when Ava's friend Joyce pressures her into hiding any evidence in her apartment that she's trans (with a long career as a showgirl), Ava feels more and more uneasy. Addams and James wrote, directed, produced, and scored the film. Addams takes the role of Ava, and James plays the role of Joyce.

=== GLAAD Media Award ===
At the 20th GLAAD Media Awards in May 2009, Transamerican Love Story tied with I Want to Work for Diddy for the GLAAD Media Award in the "Outstanding Reality Program" category. Calpernia Addams and Laverne Cox were at the awards ceremony in San Francisco to accept the honors for the respective shows.

Also in attendance was Transamerican Love Story finalist Jim Howley. He reports that when Transamerican Love Story won, he impulsively ran past the security personnel and onto the stage. After Addams' acceptance speech, he approached the lectern, introduced himself, and said a few words about transgender progress. Howley was one of the subjects of Sex Change Hospital, which was a nominee that year in the "Outstanding Documentary" category. He attended the awards ceremony with Clair Farley, a trans woman who was the subject of the 2007 documentary Red Without Blue. The couple married in 2011.

In 2016, two transgender-related series once again tied for GLAAD's "Outstanding Reality Program" award: I Am Cait (starring Caitlyn Jenner) and I Am Jazz (starring Jazz Jennings). Chris McCarthy, general manager of Logo and VH1, told Adweek in 2015 that without Transamerican Love Story and other portrayals of diverse trans issues, "there would be no I Am Cait." Said World of Wonder co-founder Randy Barbato, "We always thought our subjects were ready for prime time. Not that many people agreed with us."

== Video releases ==
MTV Networks published the complete series in a four-disc DVD set on February 27, 2009. It is distributed online through Prime Video (formerly Amazon Video), and has also been distributed through Netflix, iTunes, and LOGOonline.

== See also ==
- The Bachelorette (2003)
- There's Something About Miriam (2004)
- A Shot at Love with Tila Tequila (2007)
- My Transsexual Summer (2011)
