= Mt. San Rafael Hospital =

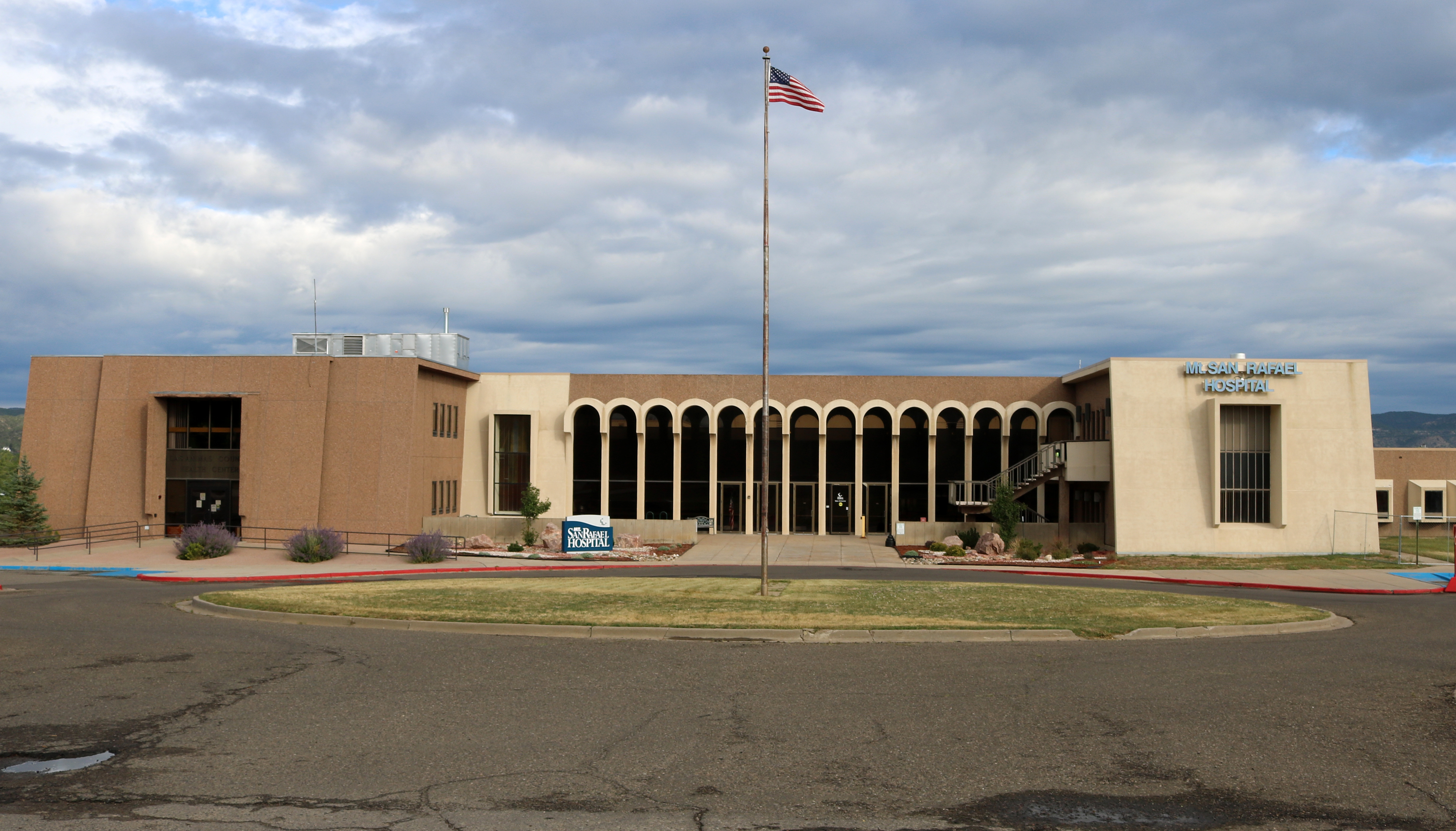
- The hospital's main façade.

- The hospital's location in Colorado.

Geography
- Location: Trinidad, Las Animas County, Colorado, United States
- Coordinates: 37°10′23″N 104°29′15″W

Organization
- Care system: Private
- Type: General
- Affiliated university: None

Services
- Emergency department: Level IV trauma center
- Beds: 25

Helipads
- Helipad: Yes

History
- Founded: 1889

Links
- Website: www.msrhc.org
- Lists: Hospitals in Colorado

Mt. San Rafael Hospital is a general hospital in Trinidad, Colorado. Founded in 1889, the hospital is a level IV trauma center. It is notable for being a pioneer in sex-change operations, with the hospital's first of thousands of such surgeries being completed there in 1969.

== History ==
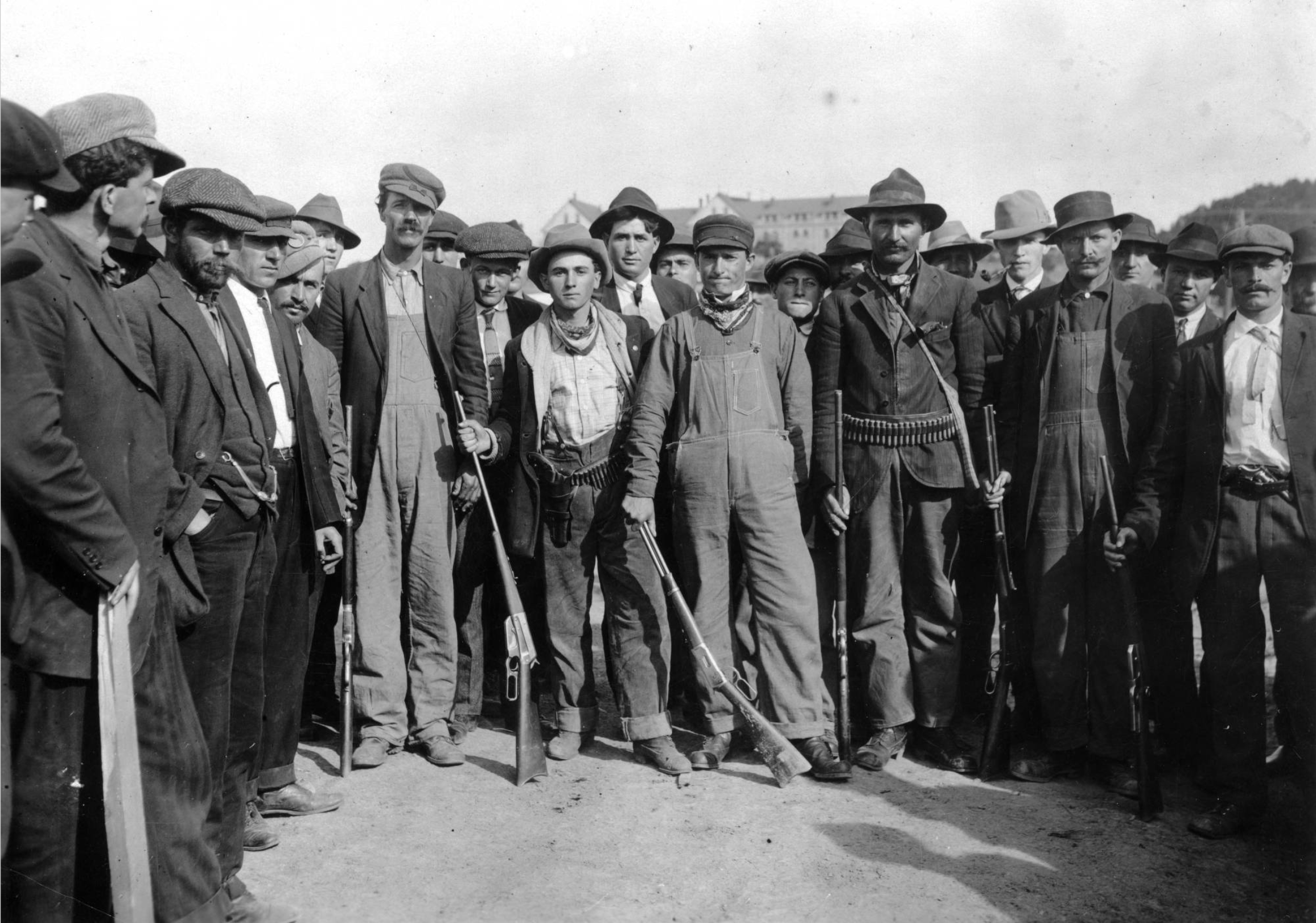
Armed strikers in front of the hospital, April 1914.

The hospital was originally established in 1889 by the Sisters of Charity. Renovations and additions were completed in 1906 and 1959. In 1969, the hospital was secularized and bought by the Trinidad Area Health Association, an organization that continues to own and run the facility. A completely new hospital building was constructed and opened in 1972 and continues to serve as Mt. San Rafael's main building today.

In January 1914, the hospital was used by General John Chase of the Colorado National Guard to hold labor activist Mother Jones during the 1913-1914 Colorado Coalfield War. Following the Ludlow Massacre, armed strikers took control of Trinidad and the hospital.

== Sex-change operations ==
The hospital's sex-change surgery service led to Trinidad being named the "sex-change capital of the world." Resident surgeon Dr. Stanley Biber performed the hospital's first sex-change operation in 1969, and thousands of additional sex-change operations were performed there until Biber's successor left following a dispute in 2010.
