= Real Momentum =

American television documentary series

Real Momentum is the name of a documentary series on the Logo network.

Documentaries in the Real Momentum series vary in length and style, and are mix of original Logo-produced documentaries, co-productions, and acquired documentaries.

The series launched with the channel on June 30, 2005; the first program to broadcast on the channel was the Logo-produced Real Momentum documentary titled The Evolution Will Be Televised, which followed the history of LGBT images in the media.

In addition to broadcasting on the Logo channel, the Real Momentum documentary series broadcasts on the Logo On Demand service, on LOGOonline.com, and can be purchased through download to own services such as iTunes.

== Season One Documentaries ==
- The Evolution Will Be Televised [6/30/2005]
- Go Dragons! A Rugby Story [7/9/2005]
- Ruthie and Connie: Every Room in the House [7/16/2005]
- Trembling Before G-d [7/23/2005]
- Gidyup! On the Rodeo Circuit [7/30/2005]
- Latino Beginnings [8/6/2005]
- The Brandon Teena Story
- Paragraph 175
- Forbidden Love, The Unashamed Stories of Lesbian Lives
- Raising Teens
- Farm Family: In Search of Gay Life in Rural America
- The Eyes of Tammy Faye
- Hip Hop Homos
- Daddy and Papa
- The Celluloid Closet
- Out in Nature: Homosexual Behaviour in the Animal Kingdom
- The Two Cubas [10/29/2005]
- Butch Mystique
- Power Lesbians
- The Cockettes

== Season Two Documentaries ==
- Curl Girls [1/2/2006]
- Bachelor Farmer
- Let's Get Frank
- Paris Is Burning
- Beautiful Daughters [2/11/2006]
- The Aggressives
- 100% Woman
- The Opposite Sex: Rene's Story
- The Opposite Sex: Jamie's Story
- When Ocean Meets Sky
- Elephant In The Room [6/23/2006]
- Jumpin' the Broom
- No Dumb Questions
- Same Sex America
- Gender Rebel
- Little Man
- Pick Up the Mic
- The Lost Tribe
- Gay Siblings [11/19/2006]

== Season Three Documentaries ==
- Southern Comfort
- Love Lessons [2/4/2007]
- Reporter Zero
- For the Love of Dolly
- Freddie Mercury: Magic Remixed

== Season Four Documentaries ==
- Small Town Gay Bar
- Camp Out
- On The Downlow
- The Believers
- Real Momentum Shorts
- Bisexual Girls
- Rock the Boat
- My Mums Used to Be Men
