= Real Gay =

2005 reality television special

- Genre: Reality television
- Presented by: Kim Coles
- Country of origin: United States
- Original language: English

Production
- Running time: 1 hour

Original release
- Network: Logo
- Release: September 11, 2005

Real Gay is a 2005 gay-themed reunion show hosted by Kim Coles. Airing on the LGBT network Logo, Real Gay featured cast members from a number of different reality television series discussing their experiences being openly gay in the spotlight of national television.

== Participants ==
Among those appearing on Real Gay were:

- Chip Arndt from The Amazing Race 4
- Lynn Warren and Alex Ali from The Amazing Race 7
- Will Wikle from Big Brother 5
- William Hernandez from The Real World: Philadelphia
- Genesis Moss from The Real World: Boston
- Ebony Haith from America's Next Top Model
- James Getzlaff from Boy Meets Boy
- Scout Cloud Lee from Survivor: Vanuatu
- Coby Archa from Survivor: Palau
- Jim Verraros from American Idol
- Brandon Kindle and Ryan Pacchiano from Showdog Moms & Dads
- Sophia Pasquis from Road Rules: The Quest
- Michelle Deighton from America's Next Top Model, Cycle 4
