= Jeffrey Carlson =

American actor (1975–2023)

- Born: Jeffrey S. Carlson; June 23, 1975; Long Beach, California, U.S.
- Died: July 6, 2023 (aged 48); Chicago, Illinois, U.S.
- Education: University of California, Davis (BA); Juilliard School (GrDip)
- Occupations: Actor; singer
- Years active: 1997–2023

Jeffrey S. Carlson (June 23, 1975 – July 6, 2023) was an American Broadway, film, and television actor and singer, known for his role as the transgender character, Zoe Luper, on the long-running daytime soap opera All My Children.

== Early life ==
Carlson was born in Long Beach, California. His mother named him Jeffrey, because she was a fan of All My Children and of the character Jeff Martin on the show. He studied acting at the University of California, Davis, where he graduated in 1997 with a Bachelor of Arts degree in dramatic art. Carlson then trained at New York City's Juilliard School as a member of the Drama Division's Group 30 (1997–2001). He was a member of the Guthrie Experience at the Guthrie Theatre in Minneapolis, Minnesota and was the recipient of the 2004 Marian Seldes/Garson Kanin Fellowship, and a Beinecke Fellow in 2007 and 2016.

== Career ==
Carlson debuted on Broadway in Edward Albee's The Goat, or Who Is Sylvia? in 2002 and also appeared in the Broadway revival of Tartuffe in 2003. He later appeared in the short-lived Boy George Broadway musical Taboo in 2003 and 2004. He was nominated for the 2004 Drama Desk Award for Outstanding Featured Actor in a Musical for the role of Marilyn in Taboo.

In August 2006, he appeared in a daytime role on All My Children, as a British rock star named Zarf. In late November 2006, he returned to the role. In the course of the storyline, Zarf was revealed to be a transgender woman named Zoe Luper, who also happened to be a lesbian. All My Children won a GLAAD Media Award for Outstanding Daily Drama in 2007 for this storyline.

Other television credits include: Law & Order: SVU, Plainsong (CBS Hallmark Hall of Fame), and he was featured in the PBS American Masters documentary on The Juilliard School. He also appeared in the films The Killing Floor, Hitch, Backseat, and Nowhere to Go But Up.

In Washington, D.C. he starred on stage in the title role of Lorenzaccio in the play by Alfred de Musset, at the Shakespeare Theatre Company and returned to STC in June 2008 to play Hamlet. He returned again in 2016 (with a reprisal in 2018) to portray Mercutio in Romeo and Juliet, a role for which he was honored with the Emery Battis Award for his original performance. Other regional theater credits include: Richard II at Yale Repertory Theatre (title role); Romeo and Juliet (Romeo) and Candida (play) at McCarter Theatre Center; The Miracle Worker at Charlotte Repertory Theatre; The Importance of Being Earnest at Paper Mill Playhouse; Golden Age at Philadelphia Theatre Company and The Kennedy Center; Eugene O’Neill Theater Center’s National Playwrights Conference and the Cape Cod Theatre Project.

In Chicago he worked at the Goodman Theater in Stage Kiss during the 2010/2011 Season and Measure for Measure during the 2012/2013 Season. Other Chicago credits include Edward II at Chicago Shakespeare Theater (title role) and Henry IV (Parts 1 & 2) at Chicago Shakespeare Theater which then transferred to the Royal Shakespeare Company in Stratford-upon-Avon, U.K. as part of their Complete Works season.

Off-Broadway credits in NYC include Antony and Cleopatra at Theatre for a New Audience; Bach at Leipzig at New York Theatre Workshop; Manuscript at the Daryl Roth Theatre; Last Easter at MCC Theater and Thief River at Signature Theatre Company.

In 2012 he starred opposite Angelica Page in the romantic screwball comedy called Psycho Therapy at the Cherry Lane Theater.

== Death ==
Carlson died on July 6, 2023, at the age of 48.

The cause of death according to the formal conclusion of the medical examiner was idiopathic dilated cardiomyopathy.
