= Pierre Foldès =

French surgeon

- Born: 6 May 1951 (age 75); Paris
- Occupation: urological surgeon
- Known for: known for mitigating damage by female genital mutilation
- Children: five

Pierre Foldès (born 6 May 1951 in Paris) is a French-Hungarian urological surgeon known for developing a surgical method of repairing some of the damage caused by female genital mutilation. He has studied the clitoris after discovering that there had been little academic interest even though there were thousands of studies of the penis.

== Life ==
Foldès was born on 6 May 1951 in 15th arrondissement of Paris to Germaine and Georges Foldes. His father was an engineer and he became a doctor even though his family were not keen. He was an enthusiastic violin player and he subsidised his studies by playing music. He obtained his degree in medicine in 1978. His violin playing fell by the wayside as he devoted up to ninety hours per week to medicine.

He discovered the damage caused by female genital mutilation while working in Burkina Faso as a surgeon repairing rectovaginal fistulas which are created by difficult childbirths. He did his first female genital mutilation repair in 1984. Foldès could see the damage caused to the labia and clitoris by female genital mutilation but he was unaware of the indelying structures of the clitoris. When he went to investigate he found very little in the literature even though there were thousands of academic papers that studied the penis,

He developed the technique in collaboration with the urologist Jean-Antoine Robein, of a clitoral restoration surgery. This technique repairs some of the urologic and obstetric problems related to FGC and it may allow the woman to experience more pleasure during sexual stimulation.

Foldès has worked to treat women who have experienced genital mutilation at his clinic. He has operated on 5,000 women since he developed the technique in 1998. He has taught the technique to Ghada Hatem-Gantzer who uses it to operate on a hundred women a year. Foldes' procedure consists of the removal of any scar tissue from the vulva, and of the lowering of the clitoris by cutting ligaments that support it while preserving nerves and blood vessels. Wedge plasty is used to reconstruct a clitoral glans. Months of healing are required for the women to gain more normal sensation in their newly exposed tissue.

Foldès was knighted in 2005 into the French Legion of Honour. In 2006, the book Victoire sur l’excision: Pierre Foldès, le chirurgien qui redonne l’espoir aux femmes mutilées was published, which chronicles the work of Foldès. It won the Prix Essai France Télévisions for 2006, and it was translated into English by Tobe Levin.

He began a collaboration with the gynecologist Odile Buisson. He surprised her by proposing that they should use ultrasound to study the structure of the g-spot and the clitoris. She was surprised that she had not thought of doing it before. In 2008, they published the first complete 3D sonography of the stimulated clitoris. In 2009 their further research, demonstrated how the erectile tissue of the clitoris surrounds the vagina. They suggested "that the special sensitivity of the lower anterior vaginal wall could be explained by pressure and movement of clitoris's root during a vaginal penetration and subsequent perineal contraction".

In 2012 he opened his own clinic in France.

Foldes is an expert of female genital mutilation and his views are cited by policy makers of the European union.

== Private life ==
Foldes has five children.
