= Gimme Sugar =

- Genre: Reality television
- Country of origin: United States
- Original language: English
- No. of seasons: 2
- No. of episodes: 12

Production
- Executive producers: Scott A. Stone; Michaline Babich; Michelle Agnew

Original release
- Network: Logo
- Release: June 9, 2008 – August 3, 2009

Gimme Sugar is a lesbian reality show that follows a group of five lesbian or bisexual women who launch and promote a ladies club night in Los Angeles. Six 30-minute episodes aired in the summer of 2008 on digital cable channel Logo, followed by a six episode second summer — Gimme Sugar Miami — in 2009. While references to a third season can be found, it never aired. Alongside the series, Logo published seventy two bonus clips that covered a variety of lifestyle topics that comprised fashion, cooking, dancing, and exercise.

One of the show's writers, Michaline Babich, was named one of ten Amazing Gay Women in Showbiz by the advocacy group POWER UP in 2008. Babich intended to create a show with a diverse cast that would provide entertainment rather than a groundbreaking exploration of lesbian and gay culture. Babich hoped that watching the show for entertainment would advance the acceptance of the LGBTQ+ by society.

== Cast ==
Season one

- Charlene Borja, a club promoter
- Bathilda Hsu
- Davonee Sou
- Alex Thomopoulos, the only bisexual woman of the five

Season two Hilary, Olga, Jazmin, Gaby, Omar & Maisi.

== Publicity ==
In 2009 Logo launched a small tour wherein the cast visited different clubs in California and Florida in an attempt to promote and cast for the second season. These events featured the stars of the show and sneak-peeks of the second season.

== Reception ==
The show currently has an 8.7/10 review score on TV.com and a 6.6/10 review on IMDB. The show was applauded for its featuring of lesbian and bisexual women and was the only show on network television with a cast of gay women after the finale of The L Word.

=== Biphobia controversy ===
Throughout the show, the one bisexual character, Alex, is often ridiculed by the other women about being bisexual rather than a lesbian. Michaline Babich, executive producer, commented that Alex was okay with the comments and that Alex, Babich, and other executive producers decided to keep the biphobic comments in the show to bring awareness to bisexuality and bisexual discrimination. Babich also commented, "Girls give each other a hard time if they smoke or wear the wrong lipstick. At end of day, it has more to do with being 20 and drunk".
