= Sex Change Hospital =

2007 American television series

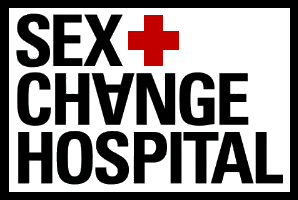
- Genre: Documentary-style reality television
- Directed by: Chris McKim
- Starring: Marci Bowers
- Theme music composer: David Benjamin Stein
- Country of origin: United States
- Original language: English
- No. of seasons: 1
- No. of episodes: 6

Production
- Executive producers: Fenton Bailey; Randy Barbato; Jeremy Simmons
- Producer: Marci Bowers (consulting producer)
- Cinematography: Damon Hennessey; Kenneth Wilson
- Editors: Nathan Allen; Jonathon Anderson; Clay Foster; Chris Lovett; Michael McCauley
- Camera setup: Multi-camera
- Production company: World of Wonder

Original release
- Network: More4
- Release: 23 May – 27 June 2007

Sex Change Hospital is an American documentary-style reality television series about 12 transgender people who have sex reassignment surgery at the Mt. San Rafael Hospital in Trinidad, Colorado, under the care of OB/GYN Marci Bowers. The patients talk about their lives and viewers follow them through their consultations with Bowers, the surgical procedures, and their post-surgical experience.

Sex Change Hospital was produced by World of Wonder, and premiered in the United Kingdom on More4 in May 2007. In June, a 47-minute excerpt screened at the 31st Frameline Film Festival in San Francisco. After the series aired on US specialty channel WE tv in 2008, it was nominated for a GLAAD Media Award for Outstanding Documentary. Discovery Health rebroadcast the series in the US in 2009, and again in 2011 when it relaunched as Discovery Fit & Health.

Bowers was the subject of the 2008 documentary Trinidad; she and her practice also feature in the final episode of TransGeneration, a documentary-style reality series that aired in 2005.

== Overview ==
Dr. Marci Bowers is a gynecologist and obstetrician at the Mt. San Rafael Hospital in Trinidad, Colorado. She is also a surgeon who specializes in gender confirmation surgeries, and she herself is transgender. Over the course of six episodes, 12 transgender people visit Bowers for surgery.

In each episode, two new patients of Bowers describe something of their family lives, their experiences as transgender people, and their feelings about the past and this new phase of their transition. When they arrive at the hospital, the doctor talks with them about the procedure and their needs. In the operating room, Bowers' explanations of different aspects of the procedure are interspersed with conversation amongst the surgical team. After surgery, once the patient is ready, Bowers visits them in their room, where they chat and talk about the surgical outcome and aftercare.

== Episodes ==
No.	Title	UK release date (More4)	U.S. release date (WE tv)
1	"Vicki and Jim"	23 May 2007	14 October 2008
Vicki Estrada is a 54-year-old trans woman who has come to Mt. San Rafael for genital reassignment surgery. She is accompanied by her girlfriend Cristina and father Steven, both of whom are very supportive. Cristina describes how Vicki's transition has prompted her own introspection, and says that she has become a better person for it. Jim Howley is a 33-year-old trans man from Hilliard, Ohio. After years of unhappiness, substance abuse, and suicide attempts, Jim has the full of support of his parents, who are relieved that Jim has a path toward wellness. He is at Mt. San Rafael for a hysterectomy. (World of Wonder later cast Jim in their reality dating series, Transamerican Love Story.)
2	"Stephanie and Ryan"	30 May 2007	21 October 2008
Stephanie Battaglino (age 47) works as a marketing director. She has come to Bowers for genital reassignment surgery. With Stephanie is her best friend, Diana (74), whose presence is essential to her. They keep Stephanie's sister and son up-to-date on her progress. Ryan Brown is a 40-year-old trans man from South Dakota. Last year he came to Mt. San Rafael for an hysterectomy, metoidioplasty, and testicular implants. One of the implants is causing him pain, and Bowers decides to replace it. For him and his wife, Kim, the surgeries are extremely important, but the expense is so great it has bankrupted them.
3	"Malinda and Alaina"	6 June 2007	28 October 2008
After Malinda Chadwick (54) started living as a woman, her wife of 28 years left, and their son cut Malinda out. Malinda was heartbroken. Gena, an online friend, gave her support, and their friendship developed into a relationship. They work together as bounty hunters. After surgery, bounty hunting seems too aggressive for Malinda, and the couple turns their attention to gold mining. Alaina Hardy is a 35-year-old patient who is about to have genital reassignment surgery. She comes to Trinidad with her partner and her best friend Krista.
4	"Lisa and Jackie"	13 June 2007	4 November 2008
45-year-old Lisa Scott started transition one year ago, and has had little support. She is about to have genital reassignment surgery and breast augmentation. Jackie Feakins, age 53, postponed transition until after her children graduated high school and she retired from her job as an air traffic controller. She has come to the hospital for male-to-female genital reassignment; two of her sons are with her.
5	"Bree and Charlie"	20 June 2007	11 November 2008
Bree Miller, age 40, was born in a small town in Tennessee. She has tried to begin transition more than once, but stopped because of the hostility she encountered. She started hormone replacement therapy (HRT) in 2006, and is now preparing for genital reassignment surgery. Her therapist (Saroj Chand, LPC-MHSP) arrives separately to observe the surgery in a professional capacity. Charlie Snook is a trans man who started HRT about five years ago, at age 46. He is in Trinidad for a vaginectomy, metoidioplasty, and testicular implants. He is accompanied by a friend who is eager to meet Bowers.
6	"Emeri and Donna"	27 June 2007	18 November 2008
Emeri Burks is a 20-year-old university student. If she does not have genital reassignment surgery before she graduates, it will not be covered by her mother's health insurer. However, because of a risk factor, the surgery must be postponed. (Emeri finally did have surgery in the summer of 2007.) Donna Richards is a 52-year-old trans woman who is preparing for genital reassignment surgery. With her is Dave, her partner of five years. She came out at work in 2002, and began to transition soon after.

== Production and broadcast ==
Sex Change Hospital was produced by World of Wonder, a company that had previously produced the 2005 docusoap TransGeneration (in which Bowers briefly appears). After Sex Change Hospital, World of Wonder produced a reality dating game show called Transamerican Love Story (2008). One of Bowers' patients, Jim Howley, was cast a contestant in the show.

Although World of Wonder is an American production company, the television premiere of Sex Change Hospital was on a British digital television channel, More4, where it aired from May to June 2007. Stateside, a 47-minute excerpt screened at the 31st Frameline Film Festival in San Francisco on 14 June. The television premiere in the US was on WE tv (a specialty channel marketed to women) where it aired from October to November 2008. Another speciality channel, Discovery Health, rebroadcast the series in the US from February to March 2009, and again in 2011 when it relaunched as Discovery Fit & Health.

== Reception ==
"While it's great that such documentaries… are making it easier to understand people who might have led completely tormented secret lives in previous generations," wrote Andrea Mullaney of The Scotsman, "focusing purely on personal stories doesn't really open up the issues behind this extraordinary development in modern times.… while their stories evoked sympathy, I wonder why no one ever asks why our gender roles have become so codified that their only option was such drastic surgery."

David Hinckley of the New York Daily News expected that the show would present some viewers with "high hurdles": transgender themes and graphic footage of surgery. "On the other hand", he adds, "the human part of the story—the things that patients and the people in their lives go through—provides familiar dramas about conflict, doubt and reconciliation. Often touching, those stories can resonate with everyone."

After the series aired in the US in 2008, it was nominated for the GLAAD Media Award for Outstanding Documentary. The award went to Parvez Sharma's A Jihad for Love, a feature-length documentary about LGBT Muslims living in different countries.

== See also ==
- Transitioning (transgender)
- Sex reassignment surgery (female-to-male)
- Sex reassignment surgery (male-to-female)
- Hormone replacement therapy (female-to-male)
- Hormone replacement therapy (male-to-female)
