= Lewis Hancox =

English graphic novelist and filmmaker (born 1989)

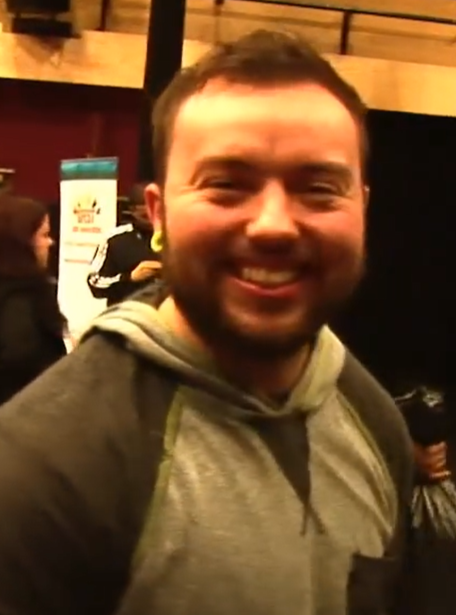
- Hancox in 2013 at Gaywise Festival
- Born: 15 June 1989 (age 37)
- Education: St Helens College; London South Bank University
- Occupation: Graphic novelist • social media personality • filmmaker
- Years active: 2011–present

TikTok information
- Page: Lewis Hancox
- Years active: 2020–present
- Followers: 1.90 million

YouTube information
- Channel: Lewis Hancox
- Years active: 2012–present
- Subscribers: 1.15 million
- Last updated: March 2026

Lewis Joy Hancox (born 15 June 1989) is an English graphic novelist, social media personality, and filmmaker. He authored the 2022 graphic memoir Welcome to St. Hell: My Trans Teen Misadventure, about growing up transgender in the 2000s, which was shortlisted for several awards, including an Eisner Award. He co-founded the documentary film project My Genderation, which has produced work for the BBC and Channel 4. In addition to his film and publishing work, Hancox is known for his online sketch comedy videos on TikTok and YouTube, and has been recognized by news outlets for his contributions to digital media and LGBTQ representation.

== Early life ==
Hancox was born on 15 June 1989, (Note: Lewis Hancox (15 June 2025) Calling Lois up to tell them they made it to 36 (and have been happily living as Lewis for 17 years). Happy birthday to me 🎈 Retrieved 7 February 2015 – via Facebook.) assigned female. He grew up in the village of Haydock near St Helens, Merseyside. As a child, Hancox wore boys' clothing, kept a short haircut, preferred to be known by the initials LJ rather than his birth name, and openly identified as a boy. Hancox attended Byrchall High School in Ashton-in-Makerfield as a teenager and later St Helens College at age 18.

== Career ==
In 2011, Hancox, aged 22, was one of the participants in the Channel 4 reality television series My Transsexual Summer, in which seven transgender people at different stages of gender transition stayed together in a large holiday home in Bedfordshire for five weekends. Hancox has said that appearing on the series was the first time he had knowingly met another trans person and described working on the show as "one of the best things I ever did", feeling more confident afterwards. At the time of appearing on the show, he was working part-time in a gallery whilst living at home with his mother in St Helens.

Hancox regularly produces original content on social media, documenting his experiences and youth as a trans man through comedy sketches, featuring characters including himself as an emo teenager "Lois", an impersonation of a stereotypical "British mum" and the character "Prinny Queen". A number of his online videos have attracted a large audience on TikTok and YouTube, garnering him a large online following.

=== Filmmaking ===
Hancox and Fox Fisher founded the film project My Genderation.

Hancox, alongside artist Fox Fisher, is the founder of My Genderation, an ongoing film project centred around gender nonconformity and the experiences of transgender people in the United Kingdom. (Note: 'BBC Fresh Profile: Fox Fisher and Lewis Hancox''. BBC. Archived from the original on 30 November 2023. Retrieved 29 December 2025) The project produces documentary short films about trans people of various ages. Fisher said that the purpose of the project was to present the experiences of transgender people without shock value or upsetting those being interviewed.

In 2013, whilst in his second year of Bachelor of Arts studies at London South Bank University, Hancox began working on the documentary film New Genderation, produced as part of My Genderation for the BBC and the BBC Fresh Initiative. The documentary follows the life of Tayler, a 14-year-old Welsh transgender boy. It was screened in the London Cinema Museum in May and aired on BBC Three in September of that year.

Hancox produced educational entertainment videos about gender, sexuality, trans topics, and issues on YouTube for the advocacy project All About Trans in 2015.

In 2016, Hancox created the six-episode Channel 4 comedy series Me and My Teen Self, in which Hancox speaks to his teenage self through time travel.

In 2013, Hancox and Fisher were ranked 79th on the Rainbow List, The Independent's annual list of influential LGBTQ people in the United Kingdom, for their work on My Genderation. In 2014, he was placed 13th in the "30 Under 30 in Digital Media" list published by The Guardian regarding young people in the field of digital media. In 2015, Hancox again appeared on the Rainbow List for his filmmaking, featured in 48th place.

=== Graphic novels and illustration ===
Hancox wrote the graphic novel-memoir Welcome to St. Hell: My Trans Teen Misadventure, which was published on 2 June 2022 by Scholastic with book launches at St Helen's Book Stop in St Helens and Pigeon Books in Southsea. The book is a comedy focusing on Hancox's life growing up transgender in St Helens during the 2000s, with St. Hell serving as a contraction of St Helens. The book shows Hancox going back in time to speak to his teenage self, whilst showcasing the confusion and difficulties he was going through at the time. Hancox has said that his work discusses transgender issues for a general audience. In 2024, Hancox's sequel to Welcome to St Hell was published by Scholastic, titled Escape from St Hell: My Trans Life Levels Up.

Hancox draws using an Apple Pencil and iPad, and has listed the Scott Pilgrim series of graphic novels and the works of Edgar Wright as creative influences for his graphic novels. Hancox was inspired to write the graphic memoir during the COVID-19 lockdown in the United Kingdom. After the book was picked up by Scholastic for publishing, he commented: "...this is the book I wish I'd had [growing up in the early 2000s] to show me I wasn't alone." He explained that "entertaining while incidentally educating is so important to me" and that in writing the memoir, that he sought to "use empathy and get beyond politics and shouting."

Following publication, Hancox was shortlisted out of more than 72,000 nominations for the 2022 National Diversity Awards in the Positive LGBT Role Model category. Welcome to St. Hell was shortlisted for the 2023 Waterstones Children's Book Prize in the Older Readers category, the first graphic memoir to be nominated. According to Christian Today, an online petition reportedly received 50,000 signatures calling for the book to be removed from the shortlist. The book was also shortlisted for the 2023 Eisner Award for Best Graphic Memoir and listed in the American Library Association's annual Great Graphic Novels for Teens list for that year. Andy Oliver of Broken Frontier called the book a "raw, witty and occasionally very tender". Pages from Welcome to St. Hell were displayed in the main gallery of The Cartoon Museum of London, in an exhibit celebrating British transgender and non-binary comic creators for London Trans+ Pride 2025.

Hancox, Fisher and the Trans Publishing Network partnered with Waterstones in 2024 and launched the Trans Pride Book Fest, a one-day festival which was hosted at the Waterstones flagship store in Piccadilly on 27 June. The event featured guests including Charlie Craggs, Laura Kate-Dale, Sophie Labelle, Jamie Raines and the Australian rock band Ocean Grove with panels sponsored by Jessica Kingsley Publishers. The second Trans Pride Book Fest was held on 6 December 2025 in London, and again featured guests, including activist Sabah Choudrey.

From April to May 2025, in collaboration with Lush Cosmetics, artwork designed by Hancox and Fisher was displayed in the windows of all 101 Lush branches across the country, as part of the brand's trans rights and inclusivity campaign.

== Personal life ==
In 2015, Hancox lived with his girlfriend in Brighton; as of 2020, they resided in Southsea, Portsmouth. He is a celebrity patron of the LGBTQ+ telephone helpline Switchboard and the National Diversity Awards.

=== Transgender identity ===
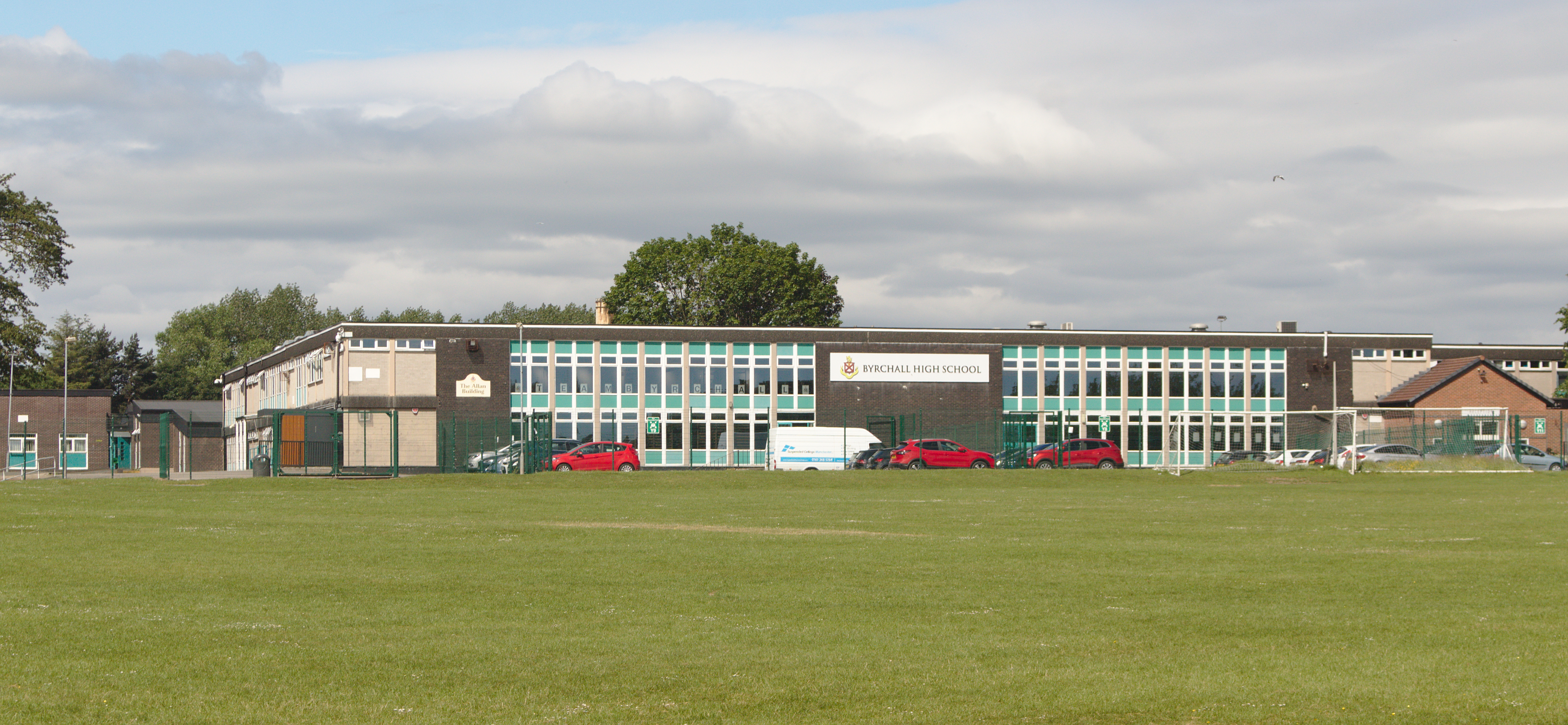
Byrchall High School in Ashton-in-Makerfield, near St Helens

Hancox is a transgender man. He has said that at the age of five he told his mother that he was "a boy trapped in a girl's body". As a student at Byrchall High School, Hancox attempted to be more feminine and "squashed the feeling [of being a man] and tried best to be a normal teenaged girl", but did not find it comfortable. He recalled being verbally bullied by other pupils for having unshaven legs and wearing a skirt whilst appearing as a boy.

During puberty, Hancox identified as a lesbian and disliked bodily physical development, engaging in dieting and exercise to lose weight in an attempt to alter a female body shape, including hitting his chest in hopes of preventing breast growth. He has said, "It wasn't that I wanted to be thin, I was trying to get rid of the feminine curves which were appearing." Hancox was diagnosed with anorexia nervosa and later turned to weightlifting as a method of changing physical appearance.

At around the age of 18, Hancox learned about transgender identity and the existence of transgender men, and later came out to his parents. He consulted a general practitioner for gender-affirming hormone therapy and was required to live as a man for a year before being prescribed testosterone, which caused him to grow a beard and his voice to deepen. After appearing on My Transsexual Summer, Hancox began a fundraiser for £6,000 for gender-affirming surgery, a privately operated mastectomy and chest reconstruction. As the fundraiser was nearing its goal, Irish comedian Graham Norton donated £1,500 to Hancox, alongside actor Stephen Fry, who tweeted about the fundraiser and donated £100, reaching the £6,000 goal.

In a 2022 interview with Geeks OUT, Hancox said:

If I could click my fingers and be born again not trans, would I? There have been times I would've said absolutely [...] But, actually, being trans has given me so many unique experiences. I've learned to turn the hard times into humour and art, which has brought me amazing opportunities. This journey has ultimately led to me achieving my childhood dream as a comic artist. I'm at peace now with the fact that I'm just a guy like any other, but with a different perspective of life.

== Bibliography ==
- Welcome to St. Hell: My Trans Teen Misadventure (2022) ISBN 978-0-7023-1390-5
- Escape from St. Hell: My Trans Teen Life Levels Up (2024) ISBN 978-1-338-82446-9
- Of the Flesh: 18 Stories of Modern Horror (2024) ISBN 978-0-00-869735-8

== See also ==
- List of people from St Helens, Merseyside
- List of comics creators
- List of transgender people
- List of LGBTQ YouTubers
