= List of people from St Helens, Merseyside =

The following is a list of people from St Helens, Merseyside in northern England, United Kingdom.

== Notable families ==
=== Feudal and manorial families ===
- De Ferrers: Administered the wider region following the 1066 Norman Conquest; Robert de Ferrers became the first Earl of Derby in 1139, establishing early governance before his descendant William de Ferrers later consolidated these sprawling regional territories
- Parrs: Controlled the manor of Parr from the 13th century until the Tudor period from Parr Hall. Long before Sir Thomas Parr fathered Queen Catherine Parr (the final wife of Henry VIII), earlier ancestors like Sir John Parr and William Parr, 1st Marquess of Northampton, expanded the family's administrative influence.
- Gerards: Heavily influential administrators across South Lancashire who held their primary seat at Bryn Hall in neighboring Ashton-in-Makerfield from 1250. Operating under prominent family leaders like Sir Thomas Gerard and Sir William Gerard, the family expanded their dominion to become Lords of the Manor of Windleshaw. As staunch Catholic recusants, they utilized their St Helens estates to construct a clandestine chapel, Windleshaw Chantry, while successfully protecting local mineral, timber, and early coal mining extraction rights across changing religious eras.
- Ecclestons: Governed the Eccleston township for over six centuries from around 1100 out of Eccleston Hall. Prominent lineage heads Richard de Eccleston and later Thomas Eccleston maintained a clandestine Catholic chapel inside their Tudor-era estate until the direct line ended in the 18th century.
- De Hollands: Served as Lords of Sutton Manor starting with Sir Robert de Holland in 1321. The family produced notable religious figures on both sides of the English Reformation, including Protestant martyr Roger Holland (executed 1558) and the beatified Jesuit priest Thomas Holland (executed 1642).
- Bolds: Held the neighboring manor of Bold from the mid-12th century until 1761, operating out of Bold Hall under long-standing family heads like Sir Richard Bold. In the 1830s, heiress Mary Bold-Hoghton and her husband Sir Henry Bold-Hoghton leased extensive tracts of land for railway infrastructure and mining, accelerating the town's industrial expansion.
- Billinges: An ancient lineage of Anglo-Saxon nobles whose administrative presence on the high ground of Billinge Hill dates back to early regional land charters. Members of the family, including Adam de Billinge, are recorded donating local tracts of land to Cockersand Abbey between 1190 and 1201. The family retained their local principal holdings and their ancestral seat at the 17th-century sandstone Billinge Hall on Crank Road for countless generations, until John Billinge and his wife Margaret sold the heritage estate to Francis Bispham in 1691.

=== Industrial and modern families ===
- Pilkingtons:

Brothers William and Richard Pilkington co-founded the glassmaking enterprise in 1826, which William's son, Sir William Windle Pilkington, subsequently expanded into a global industry leader and major local employer. In the 1950s, family member Sir Alastair Pilkington revolutionized high-volume glass manufacturing worldwide by inventing the float glass process

- Beechams:

Chemist Thomas Beecham established a patent medicine factory in the town in 1859, which his son, Sir Joseph Beecham, 1st Baronet, scaled into a global pharmaceutical enterprise. Joseph's son, Sir Thomas Beecham, utilized the family's resources to become a world-renowned classical music conductor and founder of both the London and Royal Philharmonic orchestras.

- Greenalls:

Founder Thomas Greenall established the family's original brewery on Hall Street in 1762. His grandson Peter Greenall managed the St Helens plant from 1818, heavily financing early municipal infrastructure, railway expansion, and the fledgling Pilkington glassworks while serving as an MP. His brother Sir Gilbert Greenall, 1st Baronet, assumed control in 1845, modernizing operations and consolidating holdings into the major regional Greenall Whitley brewing network

- Hughes family: Copper industrialist Michael Hughes I managed local smelting works in the late 18th century and subsequently acquired the Sherdley Hall estate in 1798. His descendants served as key local leaders, magistrates, and landowners for generations, culminating with politician Michael Hughes-Young, Baron St Helens, who sold the estate lands to create Sherdley Park in the 20th century.
- Vesteys: Brothers William Vestey, 1st Baron Vestey (1859–1940) and Sir Edmund Vestey, 1st Baronet (1866–1953), were prominent food and shipping magnates who co-founded the global Union Cold Storage Company and the Blue Star Line merchant shipping fleet, establishing major cold-storage and food distribution hubs that accelerated the town's industrial transport infrastructure.

=== Sporting families ===
- Cunningham Brothers: A prominent rugby league family deeply tied to St Helens R.F.C. Brothers Eddie and Tommy Cunningham both played for the club during the 1970s. Their younger brother, Keiron Cunningham, became one of the most decorated players in Super League history.
- Prescotts: A notable sporting and philanthropic family. Eric Prescott played for St Helens, Salford, and Widnes in the 1970s and 1980s. His son, Steve Prescott MBE, was a legendary Saints fullback who won two Grand Finals. Following a terminal cancer diagnosis, Steve established the Steve Prescott Foundation.

== Literature and writers ==
- Joan Abse (1926–2005), born in St Helens, art historian and biographer who published acclaimed volumes on the lives of John Ruskin and Gustave Courbet
- Trisha Ashley (b. 1956), born in St Helens, author of romantic comedy fiction whose works regularly chart on the UK's major fiction best-seller trackers
- Mary Craig (1928–2019), born in St Helens, journalist and BBC broadcaster who authored 14 non-fiction books, notably detailing the social history of Tibet and the Dalai Lama
- Lewis Hancox (b. 1990), graphic novelist raised in the town who authored the comedic autobiographical memoirs Welcome to St. Hell (2022) and Escape from St Hell (2024), detailing growing up transgender in St Helens"
- Richard D. Lewis (b. 1930), born in Billinge, international linguist, polyglot, and language school creator who authored the corporate text When Cultures Collide alongside the localized social histories The Billingers (1976) and Billinge History.
- Jeanne MacKenzie (1922–1986), born in St Helens, historian and Fellow of the Royal Society of Literature who co-authored definitive biographies on H. G. Wells and Charles Dickens
- Carole Matthews (b. 1960), born in St Helens, Sunday Times best-selling novelist who has published over 30 romantic comedy fiction books across 30 countries worldwide.
- Pete McCarthy (1951–2004), educated at West Park Grammar School in St Helens, broadcaster and travel writer who authored the multi-million selling travelogues McCarthy's Bar and The Road to McCarthy
- Una McCormack (b. 1972), born in St Helens, academic and science fiction novelist who authored multiple New York Times best-selling tie-in novels for Star Trek and Doctor Who

== Artists and designers ==
- Arthur Fleischmann (1896–1990), sculptor who specialised in acrylic and Perspex media, designed and created the iconic Anderton Mining Monument in St Helens town centre
- Eunice Macaulay (1923–2013), born in St Helens, graphic artist, animator, and filmmaker who worked as a trainee chemist at Pilkington Brothers before winning an Academy Award for Best Animated Short Film in 1978
- Jim Manley (b. 1934), born in St Helens, mixed-media and watercolour artist whose works are featured within multiple national public art collections
- David Reekie (b. 1947), glass artist, sculptor, and co-founder of the Contemporary Glass Society whose internationally exhibited works are featured within the permanent collections of The World of Glass.

== Arts and entertainment ==
=== Acting and theatre ===
- George Groves (1901–1976), born in St Helens, audio engineer who recorded The Jazz Singer (1927) and won two Academy Awards.
- Pete Postlethwaite (1946–2011), an Academy Award-nominated character actor, spent his formative years in the town being educated at West Park Grammar School
- David Yates (b. 1963), raised in the town and educated at St Helens College, highly acclaimed filmmaker and director best known for the final four films in the Harry Potter franchise and the Fantastic Beasts series
- Herbert Mundin (1898–1939), born in St Helens, 1930s Hollywood character actor who starred in Cavalcade (1933) and The Adventures of Robin Hood (1938)
- Michael Angelis (1944–2020), raised in the town, actor best known as the long-standing UK narrator of Thomas & Friends (1991–2012).
- Carley Stenson (b. 1982), born in Billinge, actress and singer who rose to prominence playing Steph in Hollyoaks before starring in West End musical leads
- Michael Parr (b. 1986), born in St Helens, actor best known for playing Ross Barton in the ITV soap opera Emmerdale
- Emma Rigby (b. 1989), born in St Helens, actress who played the role of Hannah Ashworth in Hollyoaks before moving to Hollywood and starring in major TV and movies.
- Robert Dorning (1913–1989), born at Croppers Hill, had a 40+ year film and television acting career including in Roman Polanski's Cul-de-sac (1966).
- Pauline Yates (1929–2015), born in St Helens, actress best known for starring as Elizabeth Perrin in the BBC sitcom The Fall and Rise of Reginald Perrin

=== Solo musicians ===
- Jacqui Abbott (b. 1973), born in St Helens, was the lead singer for alternative rock band The Beautiful South during the 1990s before forming a chart-topping duo with Paul Heaton.
- Rick Astley (b. 1966), educated in St Helens, is a pop singer-songwriter whose 1987 debut single "Never Gonna Give You Up" was a global number-one hit.
- Thomas Beecham (1879–1961), born in St Helens, was a classical conductor and impresario who famously founded both the London Philharmonic and Royal Philharmonic orchestras.
- Tim Follin (b. 1970), born in St Helens, is an electronic composer best known for creating historic video game music soundtracks across the 1980s and 1990s.

=== Bands ===
- The K's, an indie rock band formed in Earlestown and prominently associated with The Citadel, achieved widespread commercial success after their studio albums climbed to the top of the UK Albums Chart
- The Lancashire Hotpots, a comedic folk band formed in St Helens in 2006, perform and record satirical songs regarding Northern technology and British culture.
- Stealing Sheep, an acclaimed psychedelic electronic-pop trio that formed on Merseyside and performed at Glastonbury, features St Helens-born multi-instrumentalist Luciana Mercer.
- The Loungs, an indie rock band formed in the town in 2005, achieved critical acclaim and national BBC radio airplay for their melodic, post-punk pop style.

=== Comedy ===
- Bernie Clifton (b. 1936), born in St Helens, comedian and light entertainment personality on British television throughout the 1970s and 1980s.
- Johnny Vegas (b. 1970), born in St Helens, comedian, actor, and television director. He is also a local charity campaigner and ambassador.

== Politics ==
- Richard Pilkington (1841–1908), born in St Helens, glass manufacturing industrialist who served as Mayor of St Helens on four occasions before being elected as the Member of Parliament for Newton from 1899 to 1906.
- Richard Seddon (1845–1906), born in Eccleston, politician who emigrated to New Zealand and later becoming the 15th Prime Minister of New Zealand, remaining the country's longest-serving head of government to date.
- James Sexton (1856–1938), trade union leader who spent his formative years in the town, served as the Member of Parliament for St Helens from 1918 to 1931.
- Richard Pilkington (1908–1976), born in St Helens, politician who served as the Member of Parliament for Widnes (1935–1945) and Poole (1951–1964).
- Gerry Bermingham (b. 1940), barrister who served as the long-standing Member of Parliament for the St Helens South constituency from 1983 until 2001.
- Marie Rimmer (b. 1947), born in St Helens, former leader of St Helens Borough Council who has served as the Member of Parliament for the St Helens South and Whiston constituency since 2015.
- Liz Twist (b. 1956), born and raised in St Helens, politician who was elected as the Member of Parliament for Blaydon in 2017.
- Thérèse Coffey (b. 1971), raised in Billinge, politician who served as Deputy Prime Minister of the United Kingdom and Secretary of State for Health and Social Care in 2022.
- David Baines (b. 1982), local politician who served as Leader of St Helens Borough Council before being elected as the Member of Parliament for the St Helens North constituency in 2024

== Scientists ==
- Thomas Nuttall (1786–1859), born in Longford, St Helens, botanist and zoologist who served as a curator at Harvard University's botanical garden
- John William Draper (1811–1882), born in St Helens, polymath, chemist, and philosopher who pioneered early portrait photography and authored the globally translated History of the Intellectual Development of Europe (1863).
- Sir Hugh Stott Taylor KBE FRS (1890–1974), born in St Helens and educated at Cowley Grammar School, physical chemist who pioneered catalytic theory and first produced pure heavy water
- Thomas Gerald Pickavance (1915–1974), born in St Helens, nuclear physicist who worked on the wartime atomic bomb project, also serving as the first Director of the Rutherford High Energy Laboratory
- Rodney Allam MBE (b. 1940), born in St Helens, chemical engineer and clean energy innovator who co-invented the zero-emission "Allam-Fetvedt Cycle" power generation system.

== Crime and justice ==
- Ann Barnes (b. 1945), born in St Helens, former public administrator who served as the first independent Kent Police and Crime Commissioner from 2012 to 2016.
- Sir Barry Cotter (b. 1963), born in St Helens, jurist and barrister who was appointed as a Justice of the High Court of England and Wales in 2021.
- Sir Christopher Greenwood GBE CMG KC (b. 1955), born in St Helens, is an international jurist who served as a judge on the International Court of Justice at The Hague.
- Helen McCourt (1965–1988), insurance clerk from Billinge whose disappearance led to a landmark murder conviction of local pub landlord, Ian Simms, based on DNA evidence without a body; her mother's subsequent campaign resulted in the national enactment of "Helen's Law".
- Peter Moore (1946–2010), born in St Helens, serial killer convicted in 1996 for murdering four men across North Wales.

== Sport ==
=== Rugby League ===
- Lee Briers, international point-scorer and long-serving scrum-half who won multiple Challenge Cups; he was born and raised in St Helens and began his professional career with his hometown club.
- Keiron Cunningham, international hooker who spent his entire professional career with St Helens R.F.C., scoring 175 tries across 496 appearances; he was born and raised in the town and is honoured with a life-sized bronze statue outside the stadium.
- Ray French MBE (b. 1939), born in St Helens, former dual-code rugby international who served as the primary BBC television commentator for rugby league matches for nearly three decades.
- Steve Ganson, former international and Super League match referee who went on to serve as the Head of Match Officials for the Rugby Football League; he was born and raised in St Helens.
- James Graham, international prop and former England and Great Britain captain who achieved immense success in both the Super League and the NRL; he was raised locally and developed his career at St Helens' famed amateur club, Thatto Heath Crusaders.
- Tara Jones, international hooker for St Helens Women and professional referee; born and raised in St Helens, she made sports history by becoming the first woman to referee a senior men's professional rugby league match in the United Kingdom.
- Jonny Lomax, current club captain who has won five Super League Grand Finals; though born in Bury, he was raised entirely in the borough, attending Rainford High School and developing through the local community game.
- Alex Murphy, Hall of Fame legend widely regarded as one of the greatest British scrum-halves of all time, captaining St Helens, Warrington, and Leigh to Challenge Cup glory; he was born and raised in the town.
- James Roby, hooker and captain who holds the record for the most appearances in Super League history (551 matches), winning six Grand Finals and the 2007 Man of Steel; he was born, raised, and spent his entire 20-year career exclusively with the town's club.
- Emily Rudge, former England international captain and forward for St Helens Women, who led the club to a historic Treble of major domestic titles.
- Matty Smith, international scrum-half and dual Grand Final winner who won the 2013 Lance Todd Trophy; he was born and raised in St Helens and developed his game through Blackbrook ARLFC.
- Sia Soliola, international forward who made 117 appearances for Saints and scored a try in the 2014 Grand Final victory; he became a deeply respected, high-impact community figure in the town during his five-year Merseysider residency.
- Luke Thompson, international prop and Great Britain representative who won two Grand Finals with Saints before playing in the NRL; he was born and raised in St Helens and developed at Bold Miners ARLFC.
- Paul Wellens, fullback who won the 2006 Man of Steel award and achieved a historic "Treble" of titles before becoming the club's head coach; he was born and raised in St Helens and graduated through the local amateur system.
- Jack Welsby, fullback and multi-Grand Final winner; he developed his game directly within the borough's premier amateur ranks at Blackbrook ARLFC.

=== Football ===
- Lily Parr, pioneer of the women's game who was born on Durham Street in St Helens; she scored over 900 goals for the Dick, Kerr Ladies and became the first woman inducted into the National Football Museum Hall of Fame.
- Bert Trautmann, German goalkeeper who settled locally following World War II; he lived, married, and played for St Helens Town F.C. at their Hoghton Road ground, where his sensational local performances launched his career before he signed for Manchester City.
- Bill Foulkes, full-back for Manchester United between 1952 and 1970; he was born in St Helens and worked underground as a coal miner at the town's Lea Green Colliery before surviving the Munich air disaster of 1958.
- Conor Coady, England international defender, former Wolverhampton Wanderers captain and Everton player, who was born in St Helens and raised in the town while attending Bleak Hill Primary School.
- Chris Foy, former Premier League and FIFA international football referee, who was born and raised in St Helens.
- Ray Ranson, defender for Manchester City and Newcastle United who later served as chairman of Coventry City; he was born and raised in St Helens.
- Stephen Jordan, Premier League defender who made over 50 top-flight appearances for Manchester City and later played for Burnley; he was born and raised in St Helens.
- Tommy Lucas, England international full-back who made over 300 league appearances for Torquay United and Liverpool; he was born and raised in St Helens.
- David Mercer, England international winger who made over 200 appearances for Sheffield United and won the FA Cup in 1925; he was born and raised in St Helens.
- Jack Bamber, England international footballer who played as a midfielder for Liverpool and Leicester City in the 1920s; he was born and raised in St Helens.
- Alex Finney, defender who won the FA Cup with Bolton Wanderers in the historic 1923 White Horse Final at Wembley Stadium; he was born and raised in St Helens.
- Kellie-Ann Leyland, women's footballer who represented the Saint Kitts and Nevis international side; she was born and raised in St Helens.
- Hubert Redwood, defender who played for Manchester United throughout the 1930s; he was born and raised in St Helens.
- Mark Winstanley, central defender who made over 400 Football League appearances, most notably for Bolton Wanderers; he was born and raised in St Helens.
- Gary Stretch, footballer for Mansfield Town who was born in St Helens; he later transitioned into a world-class professional boxer and Hollywood actor.

=== Motor sport ===
- Colin Hardman, local sidecar racer who achieved widespread regional acclaim after winning the 1989 Isle of Man TT Sidecar Race 'A'.
- Andy Middlehurst, racing driver and multiple historic Isle of Man TT car race winner, who was born and raised in St Helens.
- Richie Worrall, speedway rider who has competed in the British speedway leagues, born and raised in St Helens.
- Steve Worrall, speedway rider and British Final Championship runner-up, who had spells at Belle Vue Aces, was born and raised in St Helens with his twin Richie.

=== Darts ===
- Michael Smith, darts player who was born and raised in St Helens; he achieved global sporting fame by winning the 2022 Grand Slam of Darts and the 2023 PDC World Darts Championship.
- Stephen Bunting, darts player who won the 2014 BDO World Darts Championship and the 2024 PDC Masters; though born in Liverpool, he was raised entirely in St Helens and continues to live in the borough.
- Dave Chisnall, darts player, multi-time major PDC television finalist, and winner of numerous European Tour crowns, who was born and raised in St Helens.
- Wes Newton, former darts player who was born and raised in St Helens; he served as a pioneer for the town's modern darts boom, reaching a career-high ranking of World Number 5, competing as a Premier League resident, and reaching the finals of the UK Open.
- Alan Tabern, darts player and former PDC World Championship quarter-finalist, who was born and raised in St Helens and alongside Wes Newton helped establish the town as a modern professional darts stronghold in the early 2000s.

=== Cricket ===
- Ken Shuttleworth, international fast bowler who represented the England national team in 5 Test matches and one ODI between 1970 and 1971, also playing for Lancashire and Leicestershire; he was born and raised in St Helens.
- John Lyon, first-class county wicketkeeper-batsman who made 86 appearances for Lancashire between 1973 and 1979; he was born and raised in St Helens.
- Mike Beddow, first-class batsman who made 33 appearances for Lancashire in the 1962–1966 seasons; he was born and raised in St Helens.
- Gerard Houlton, first-class batsman who made 20 appearances for Lancashire between 1961 and 1963; he was born and raised in St Helens.
- David Russell, first-class and List A cricketer who played as a medium-pace bowler for Cambridge University in the 1970s; he was born in the Haresfinch district of St Helens.
- William Richardson, first-class right-arm fast bowler who made appearances for Worcestershire following the First World War; he was born and raised in St Helens.
- Leo Watson, first-class cricketer who emigrated to New Zealand and played for the Otago Volts during the 1911–12 season; he was born and raised in St Helens.
- Geoff Hunter, Minor Counties first-class batsman and medium-pace bowler who made appearances for Dorset and the Minor Counties representative team; he was born in the Windle district of St Helens.
- Keith Harris, List A batsman who made appearances for the Cheshire team; he was born and raised in St Helens.

=== Other sports ===
- Martin Murray, boxer, former British and Commonwealth middleweight champion, and four-time world title challenger, who was born, raised, and continues to train in St Helens.
- Gary Stretch, boxer who won the British Light-Middleweight title before transitioning into a Hollywood actor; he was born and raised in St Helens, where he also briefly played football in his early youth.
- Lucy Renshall, judoka, multiple-time IJF Grand Slam gold medalist, World Number 1, and dual Team GB Olympian (Tokyo 2020 and Paris 2024), who was born and raised in St Helens.
- David Mercer, Olympic weightlifter who won the Bronze Medal at the 1984 Los Angeles Olympic Games and a Commonwealth Gold Medal; he was born and raised in St Helens.
- Tommy Horton, golfer, two-time Ryder Cup representative, and European Senior Tour champion; he was born in St Helens in 1941 before his family relocated to Jersey.
- Alan Ashcroft, rugby union forward who made 16 appearances for the England national team and toured internationally with the British & Irish Lions in 1959; he was born in St Helens and educated at the town's Cowley Grammar School.
- Rachael Letsche, world-champion gymnast and tumbler who won the gold medal at the 2014 World Tumbling Championships; she was born, raised, and trained directly within the St Helens gymnastics system.
- Dan Highcock, wheelchair basketball player and Paralympian who represented Team GB at the 2012 Summer Paralympics in London; he was born and raised in St Helens.
- Charles Pilkington, alpinist, mountaineer, and colliery engineer; he was born directly into the town's premier glass manufacturing dynasty as the son of Richard Pilkington.

== Other ==
- Liam Hackett MBE (b. 1991), born in St Helens, is an activist, author, and entrepreneur who founded the global youth anti-bullying charity Ditch the Label
- Carol Kefford OBE (b. 1958), born in St Helens, is a nursing executive and former military nursing officer who served as Chief Nurse for Nuffield Health and Colonel Commandant of the Queen Alexandra's Royal Army Nursing Corps.
- John Rylands (1801–1888), born in St Helens, was a textile entrepreneur and philanthropist whose legacy is commemorated by the John Rylands Research Institute and Library in Manchester
- James Waterworth (1806–1876), born in St Helens, was a Catholic missionary priest, theologian, and author who translated the historical decrees of the Council of Trent.
