= My Transsexual Summer =

British reality TV series

- Genre: Documentary-style reality television
- Developed by: Ana de Moraes; Jonas Crabtree; Colleen Flynn
- Directed by: Helen Richards
- Starring: Drew-Ashlyn Cunningham; Fox Fisher; Karen Gale; Lewis Hancox; Sarah Savage; Donna Whitbread; Maxwell Zachs
- Narrated by: Nina Sosanya
- Country of origin: England
- Original language: English
- No. of series: 1
- No. of episodes: 4

Production
- Executive producers: Meredith Chambers; Sam Whittaker
- Producers: Helen Richards (series producer); Elaine Stoneham (senior producer)
- Editor: See episode list
- Camera setup: Single-camera
- Running time: 47 minutes
- Production company: Twenty Twenty

Original release
- Network: Channel 4
- Release: 8 November – 29 November 2011

My Transsexual Summer is a British documentary-style reality series about seven transgender people in different stages of transition. For five weekends in the summer of 2011, they stay together in a large holiday home in Bedfordshire, where they meet and help each other with some of the struggles that transgender people face. Between these weekend retreats, they go back to their lives and real-world challenges.

In the early 2010s, Channel 4 resolved to improve the accuracy and depth of their representation of transgender people. My Transsexual Summer was the first programme about transgender people they created after making this resolution. Channel 4 first broadcast the series in November 2011. It was rebroadcast in the UK on More4 in 2012, and on ABC2 in Australia in 2013. Also in 2013, two of the show's participants themselves started making documentary short films and videos about being transgender.

== Background ==
In April 2010, non-profit organisation Trans Media Watch published a study called "How Transgender People Experience the Media", which found that there is "an endemic problem with negative and inaccurate representations [of transgender people in British media stories], and observed that this leads to considerable real-life suffering".

The following September, the Westminster Media Forum hosted a keynote seminar on the representation of LGBT people in British mass media. Two speakers in particular addressed the subject of transgender representation: Stuart Cosgrove, Director of Creative Diversity at Channel 4; and Tim Davie, chairperson of the BBC Working Group on Portrayal and Inclusion of Lesbian, Gay and Bisexual Audiences. They noted a general absence of transgender people in British broadcasting, and reported that "transgender storylines… are frequently lacking in breadth and substance." In a later interview, Cosgrove added that there are "high levels of inaccuracy" in British media reports about transgender people.

In an effort to improve this situation, Trans Media Watch drafted and published a memorandum of understanding for media companies: signatories of the memorandum agree to "work toward… increasing positive, well-informed representations of transgender people in the media." In March 2011, Channel 4 became the first company to sign the memorandum. "Our editorial independence always come first; but it is part of our remit to reflect the diversity of the UK", said Cosgrove.

After signing, Channel 4 engaged journalist/activist Paris Lees of Trans Media Watch to be a production consultant for the show; Lees served as consultant for the duration of production.

=== Production ===
Channel 4 gave the programme the working title Girls Will Be Boys and Boys Will Be Girls. Mark Raphael, the commissioning editor for documentaries, contracted a British production company called Twenty Twenty Productions to make the series. Twenty Twenty was at the time a subsidiary of Shed Media. Former commissioning editor for documentaries Meredith Chambers served as executive producer for Channel 4, and Sam Whittaker was executive producer for Twenty Twenty. The series producer and director was Helen Richards.

Filming began several weeks after the signing of the memorandum, and continued over a period of four months. My Transsexual Summer first aired on Channel 4 in November 2011.

== Participants ==
The participants in the programme were four trans women and three trans men from different parts of England. They ranged in age from 22 to 52; five of the participants were under 30.

Drew-Ashlyn Cunningham
Drew-Ashlyn, a 22-year-old trans woman from Wakefield, has been living as a woman for more than four years. Her family are supportive, but before the show she had never met another trans person—let alone trans people near her own age.
Fox Fisher
Fox (age 30) is a screen printing artist from Brighton. Since starting HRT six months ago, Fox is all-too aware that the hormones are slow to manifest visible changes.
Karen Gale
Karen, from Essex, worked for many years as a police officer, and later as a lorry driver. She divorced in 1985, and wants to be able to see her daughter again. At age 52, she is about to undergo vaginoplasty.
Lewis Hancox
Lewis (age 22) is from St Helens, Merseyside. Like Drew, he says he has never knowingly met another trans person before. He decided at age 18 to transition, and he has been living as a man for three years.
Sarah Savage
Sarah (age 29) is from Jersey. She has only recently begun presenting as a woman full-time; during the course of the show, she comes out to her mother.
Donna Whitbread
Donna is a 25-year-old from Norwich. She and Drew have both been on hormone replacement therapy (HRT) for two years.
Maxwell Zachs
Max is a 25-year-old trans man from Tottenham. He is Reform Jewish, and hopes to become a rabbi. Max was living in New Zealand when he began preparing to undergo mastectomy. After seeking help locally, he had the procedure done in Thailand instead.

== Episodes ==
No. in series	Title	Editor	Camera	Original release date
1	"Episode 1"	Olivia Baldwin	Cliff Evans	8 November 2011
The seven meet in the retreat house, have a photo shoot, share meals, and get to know each other. Donna and Drew give Sarah a makeover. The next night, everyone goes out on the town and celebrates Karen's upcoming surgery.
2	"Episode 2"	Tom Appleby	Cliff Evans / Ian Serfontein	15 November 2011
Sarah wants to come out to her mum; she pays a visit to Drew's mother to prepare herself. Karen is in hospital recovering from the vaginoplasty operation. When everyone else gathers at the house, they have a video chat with her, and then discuss genital surgery. A trans man visits the house to talk to the group about what it's like to have phalloplasty. At night, the group goes out to a village pub. Lewis, who works at a crafts shop, is overwhelmed by the high cost of gender-confirmation surgeries. Drew, too, must pay for surgeries; but she must find work.
3	"Episode 3"	Emily Rosen-Rawlings	Ian Serfontein	22 November 2011
Sarah has been living as a woman for two months, and her confidence is blossoming. Karen is out of hospital and back at the house. Lewis meets a man who's had chest surgery; Lewis' dad helps to organise a fundraising event. Drew gets a job at a coffeehouse. Fox and Lewis consider packing options.
4	"Episode 4"	Ian Hughes	Ian Serfontein	29 November 2011
The group talk about partners and dating. Donna, Karen, and Sarah go to a transgender event at a nightclub in London. Fox has a night out with cisgender male friends, and is worried about passing. Sarah looks for a place to live in Brighton, but is met with discrimination. Lewis' fundraiser goes well. Donna announces that she's dating a man. Drew, who has been away on holiday, returns for the final weekend of the retreat. The group invite family members to the retreat house; Sarah is pained that hers have severed ties with her.

== Response ==
Before the first episode aired, journalist Patrick Strudwick asked, "Channel 4, why call your new documentary My Transsexual Summer? It sounds like gender tourism, a fun little trip to the other side." Sarah Dean, an entertainment editor for The Huffington Post UK, called the title "sensationalist". Although Sarah Lake of Trans Media Watch found the title contentious, she defended it by pointing out that transition is a temporary process like coming of age; even so, she believed the title to be "only slightly better" than the "dire and totally inappropriate" working title, Girls Will Be Boys and Boys Will Be Girls. Her overall assessment was that "although the programme makers undeniably made some compromises to draw in viewers, millions will have enjoyed the company of these seven, shared in their lives and learned a lesson in diversity.… They will now have an entry point to broadening their understanding of the rich and joyful diversity of gender experience, something which has always existed but of which they were previously unaware."

Politician and activist Zoe O'Connell described some of the wording in the narration as "cringeworthy", but felt that "it’s more than just a step in the right direction, it’s a programme that pretty accurately reflected how many trans people carry on with each other in private."

Musician, activist, and writer CN Lester listed some ways in which the show perpetuated misconceptions or otherwise fell short, but still saw it as a turning point in the representation of transgender people on television: "It felt like a game changer. The overall feel of it—of hope, of warmth—that felt totally new to me. And hats off to the seven trans people... for putting that across."

When the second episode aired, transgender journalist Juliet Jacques posted her thoughts to the New Statesman's politics blog, The Staggers: "At this point... the limited level of improvement in trans representation on TV shown by My Transsexual Summer is probably the best we can expect." She felt the major barriers to better representation to be "producers' prejudices about what viewers will accept or understand" and extremely narrow bandwidth for "minority subjects".

After seeing the first three episodes, Maxwell Zachs called the series "a disappointment". One reason for this, he says, is that although "we see... lovely, endearing transsexuals" portrayed in the show, "what I don’t see is anything that is going to make people think or feel any differently about what gender is or how it limits us all in one way or another." He lamented that their expressions of nuance in gender identity and discussions of genderqueerness were absent from the broadcast edit of the show.

After the final episode aired, Juliet Jacques wrote a follow-up article for Time Out. She concludes: "Perhaps in 30 years' time, My Transsexual Summer will look as dated as [the 1980 documentary] A Change of Sex does now. If so, this will be because it has, for all its faults, taken trans-related television in a more positive direction."

== Participants' lives after the show ==
=== Karen, Drew, Max and Donna ===
Less than a month after the final episode of My Transsexual Summer aired, Karen Gale delivered part of Channel 4's alternative Christmas message on Christmas Day, 2011. The theme of the broadcast was "Just Be Yourself". In February 2016, Karen's local newspaper, the Romford Recorder, interviewed her about what life was like before she transitioned.

Drew-Ashlyn Cunningham made speaking appearances at schools, universities, and youth groups. She became a supporter of Gendered Intelligence (a nonprofit organisation that aids trans youth), and a celebrity patron of the 2012 and 2013 National Diversity Awards. In 2012 she became a make-up artist for Illamasqua, and also wrote for Gay Star News. In late 2012, she began to train in professional wrestling, as this was a childhood dream of hers; by September 2013 she was preparing for her first match. Her wrestling name is Harley Ryder. By April 2013, she was also working part-time for Gaydio, an LGBT FM radio station in the UK. In January 2014, she reported that she was continuing to work with make-up and to wrestle, that she was still making appearances at schools, and that she was writing an autobiography.

Maxwell Zachs is a writer, Judaic studies scholar, and trans activist. Since 2011 he has written for various publications on subjects pertaining to gender and Judaism. In 2012, he started a petition calling on the WHO to delist transsexualism from the International Classification of Diseases. After a period of charity work, he moved to Stockholm to study at Paideia, the European Institute for Jewish Studies in Sweden, on a one-year fellowship. In 2013, while living in Stockholm, he published some of his plays, as well as a dystopian novella called The People's Republic of Nowhere.

Donna Whitbread is a stage and festival performer. In 2014, she joined the cast of cabaret act Ladyboys of London—a company of three trans women plus four male dancers, with choreography by Kamilah Beckles. They debuted at the Hippodrome Casino in London's West End on 29 December, and Donna opened the show with a fire breathing act. One year later she announced that she had a role in John Cameron Mitchell's film How to Talk to Girls at Parties (2017). In 2017 BBC News videotaped her for Gay Britannia, television programming that marked the 50th anniversary of the Sexual Offences Act 1967. She answered questions written by cisgender people about trans women.

=== Sarah, Lewis and Fox ===
After her time with her new friends at the retreat, Sarah Savage was optimistic. "I left the retreat with a different outlook on life, I could feel my confidence growing, slowly." She appeared on chat shows ITV Breakfast and Live with Gabby in 2011, and returned to television in March 2013 as a guest on The Alan Titchmarsh Show. She took a job in Brighton, and has a blog that she started during the production of My Transsexual Summer. In the spring of 2013, she started HRT. 2013 was also the inaugural year of Trans Pride Brighton, the first transgender pride festival in the UK, and she and Fox Fisher served on the organisation committee. In 2015 Sarah and Fox published a picture book, Are You a Boy or are You a Girl?, which Sarah wrote and Fox illustrated. "Before I started transitioning, I never wrote, I never... did anything creative," said Sarah in a 2013 interview. "For some reason... living in a female role has allowed me to be more creative."

Lewis Hancox' fundraising events attracted donations from TV viewers; among those who gave to the cause were Stephen Fry and Graham Norton. Later that year, Lewis began preparing for a more complicated gender-affirmation surgery: metoidioplasty. Lewis moved to London to study Digital Film and Video at London South Bank University. In 2013, he and Fox Fisher started the My Genderation project, in which they make short documentaries about transgender people and gender variance. Their production company is called Lucky Tooth Films. The Independent on Sunday placed Lewis and Fox on their Pink List for 2013 (a list of "101 gay, lesbian, bisexual and transgender people that make a difference"), and on the Rainbow List in 2015. (The Pink List was renamed to Rainbow List in 2014). In 2014, The Guardian included Lewis on their "30 under 30" list of "top young people in digital media".

Fox Fisher (aka Raphael Fox) continued to work as a freelance screen printer and visual artist. In addition to their creative projects with Lewis and Sarah, Fox wrote a few pieces for The Huffington Post. Like Sarah, they felt a new creative freedom from transitioning: "It's easier to make art now because I feel like I've got a huge chunk of my life out of the way." In 2014, Fox spoke at TEDxBrighton, and was nominated for the alumnus award at the University of Brighton, where they were a Master of Arts student. Fox completed a Master's degree in Sequential Design and Illustration in 2015. In July 2017, the university granted them an honorary doctorate "in recognition of their major contribution to raising the profile, both nationally and internationally, of issues affecting trans people and the promotion of arts in the media". Fox is active in the media as a trans spokesperson, consultant, actor, and filmmaker. They have spoken about trans issues on Good Morning Britain, Inside Out, and This Morning.

== See also ==
- A Change of Sex (1980)
- TransGeneration (2005)
- Transgender culture
- List of reality television programs with LGBT cast members
- Media portrayals of transgender people
- Timeline of LGBT history in Britain
