= Beddow =

Beddow is an English surname. Notable people with the surname include:

- Clem Beddow (1885–?), English footballer
- Mike Beddow (born 1941), English cricketer
- Margery Beddow (1937–2010), American actress, dancer, director and choreographer
- Michael Beddow (c. 1947–2019), British Germanist
- Maurice Beddow Bayly (1887–1961), English physician

== See also ==
- The Beddow Schools
- Beddow Cup
