= Owl Fisher =

Icelandic writer and transgender activist

Ugla Stefanía Kristjönudóttir Jónsdóttir
- Born: January 6, 1991 (age 35)
- Other name: Owl Fisher
- Education: University of Iceland
- Occupations: Journalist; filmmaker; author; activist
- Known for: Non-binary trans activism, co-directing My Genderation film project, co-authoring Trans Teen Survival Guide, role in crafting Iceland's Gender Autonomy Act
- Partner: Fox Fisher
- Awards: Science and Education award by Siðmennt (2015); BBC's 100 Women (2019)

Ugla Stefanía Kristjönudóttir Jónsdóttir, also known as Owl Fisher (born 6 January 1991), is an Icelandic journalist, filmmaker, author and non-binary trans activist.

== Early life ==
Fisher was born in Iceland on 6 January 1991. Fisher announced they (Note: Fisher is non-binary and uses they/them pronouns.) were trans in 2010, and was one of the youngest people to have undergone a medical transition in Iceland. Fisher's father currently leads the governing council of Húnavatnshreppur, the area in which Fisher was born and raised, and has publicly written in support of them and their transition.

In 2017, Fisher graduated with Master's Degree in Gender Studies from the University of Iceland.

== Activism and career ==
=== LGBTQIA+ activism ===
Fisher was a founding member of HIN - Hinsegin Norðurland, an organisation for queer people in Northern Iceland in 2011. Following on from that they joined the board of Trans Iceland, and were the chair of the organisation until March 2022. They were the educational advisor of Samtökin '78, Iceland's national queer organisation, from 2012 to 2016. On an international level, they were also a board member of The International LGBTQI Queer and Student Organisation from 2014 to 2016.

In 2016, Fisher did a TEDx Talk at TEDx Reykjavík called "Moving Beyond the Binary of Sex and Gender", where they talked about transgender and intersex people from their own personal perspective.

As chair of the organization Trans Iceland, Fisher played a role in crafting legislation to expand the rights of trans and nonbinary people in Iceland. From 2015 to 2019, in collaboration with Kitty Anderson of Intersex Iceland and with Icelandic lawmakers, they helped develop the Gender Autonomy Act which was passed in June 2019. Fisher has criticized the final version of the bill for removing the provisions against intersex medical interventions which had originally formed part of the bill.

Fisher relocated to the UK in 2016. They co-direct an ongoing film project called My Genderation, highlighting trans experiences. They work with All About Trans, a UK organization which works to improve trans representation in media. They have contributed articles to a number of British newspapers, including The Guardian and The Independent, as well as to the lesbian magazine DIVA. They also co-authored the book Trans Teen Survival Guide with their partner Fox Fisher, published by Jessica Kingsley Publishers in 2018.

In June 2020, Fisher and three other authors resigned in protest from the Blair Partnership literary agency also representing J.K. Rowling, when the company refused to issue a public statement of support for transgender rights, saying that "freedom of speech can only be upheld if the structural inequalities that hinder equal opportunities for underrepresented groups are challenged and changed."

=== Political career ===
In 2016 and 2017, Fisher ran for parliament in Iceland on behalf of Vinstri Græn, an eco-socialist political party. In 2017 they announced their resignation from the party after it formed a government with Sjálfstæðisflokkurinn, the conservative party of Iceland.

== Recognition ==
In 2015, Fisher was awarded the Science and Education award by Siðmennt, the Icelandic Humanist Association.

They were named one of the BBC's 100 Women for 2019.

== Publications ==
- Fisher, Owl and Fisher, Fox (2021) Trans Survival Workbook. London: Jessica Kingsley Publishers. ISBN 978-1-78775-629-8.
- Fisher, Owl and Fisher, Fox (2018) Trans Teen Survival Guide. London: Jessica Kingsley Publishers. ISBN 978-1-78592-341-8.
