= Paris Lees =

British journalist and activist for transgender rights

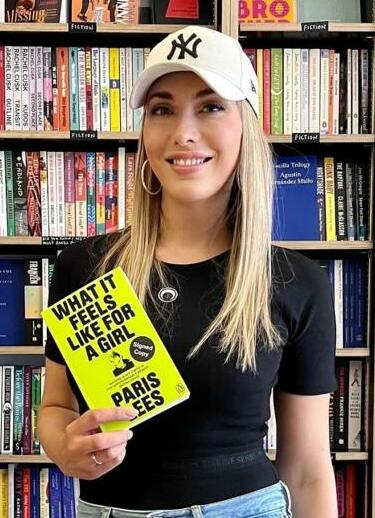
- Paris Lees at the Brick Lane Bookshop in London holding her book 'What It Feels Like For A Girl' in 2022.
- Born: Hucknall, Nottinghamshire, England
- Occupations: Author, journalist, presenter and campaigner

Paris Lees is an English author, journalist, presenter and campaigner. She topped The Independent on Sunday's 2013 Pink List, came second in the 2014 Rainbow List, and was awarded the Positive Role Model Award for LGBT in the 2012 National Diversity Awards. Lees is the first transgender columnist at Vogue and was the first transgender woman to present shows on BBC Radio 1 and Channel 4. Her first book, What It Feels Like For a Girl, was published by Penguin in 2021 and adapted into a television series in 2025.

== Early life and education ==
Lees was born and grew up in Hucknall, Nottinghamshire. Her mother, Sally, gave birth to her aged 17. Her father, Daren Lees, worked as a bouncer. Her parents separated when she was a baby. Lees' aunt and her grandmother helped to raise her. Lees describes herself as having had behavioural difficulties as a child and aged 9 her mother sent her to live with her father. At school, Lees underwent severe bullying, although she achieved good GCSE results. She began having sex with men in exchange for money aged 14. Lees has stated that she recognises the experience as statutory rape, although she did not at the time.

At age 16, Lees moved out of her father's house. Lees later committed a robbery, for which she served eight months in prison, beginning at age 18. Lees later said, "I had dropped out of college. Basically, I had gone off the rails because I was terrified of going to prison. I ended up taking lots of drugs." While in prison Lees decided to change: "I just thought, 'I'm this silly teenage boy in a prison cell who has made a huge mistake and I want to be this happy person'." After being released from prison early, Lees studied for her A-Levels.

Lees moved to Brighton, a notably LGBT-friendly city, to study English at university. Not long after moving, Lees started to identify publicly as a woman. "In the space of six weeks I went from living in Nottingham as a boy [...] to living in Brighton as a girl." She received a referral to Charing Cross Gender Identity Clinic, where she received hormone treatment to begin her gender transition.

== Career ==
=== Journalism and presenting ===
Lees moved to London to pursue a career in journalism after graduating from university.

She founded the first British magazine aimed at the trans community, META, and was the acting assistant editor of Gay Times. She also has columns in both Gay Times and Diva, and was the first trans cover girl for Diva.

Lees has also written for newspapers and magazines, including The Independent, The Guardian, The Daily Telegraph, PinkNews, and Vice, as well as for Channel 4 News.

Lees has worked as a presenter for television and radio, being the first trans woman presenter on both BBC Radio 1 and Channel 4. On Radio 1, she produced a documentary entitled "The Hate Debate" for BBC Radio 1's Stories in which the attitudes people have towards minority groups were considered, along with racism, homophobia, transphobia and Islamophobia. Critics praised Lees for doing "a fine job of provoking her listeners" and for seeming "genuinely interested in the opinions of the young people she interviewed". "The Hate Debate" was followed up with a second documentary in the same slot, "My Transgender Punk Rock Story", interviewing transgender rock star Laura Jane Grace and introducing the teenage audience to trans concepts of identity both within and outside of the binary. She also presented the episode "Trans" of Channel 4's The Shooting Gallery.

On 25 October 2013, Lees took part as a panellist in the BBC's 100 Women event. On 31 October, Lees became the first openly trans panellist to appear on the BBC's Question Time programme, drawing praise from commentators who included former Deputy Prime Minister John Prescott and the Labour Party deputy leader Harriet Harman.

In 2018, Lees was appointed as Vogue's first trans columnist.

In 2021, Penguin released Lees' first book, What It Feels Like For A Girl, a novel memoir based on Lees' life aged 13 to 18, beginning in 2001. In the book, Lees uses the fictional character of Byron as a way of writing about her pre-transition self. Lees had approached Penguin with the idea for the book in 2013, originally planning to write a more conventional autobiography. In 2025, a television series based on the book was released on BBC Three.

=== Activism ===
Lees, working with Trans Media Watch, challenged Channel 4 to remove transphobic material from their broadcasts, and consulted with the channel for its documentary My Transsexual Summer. She has worked with several media outlets to guide the covering of transgender people; in its 2013 Pink List award coverage, The Independent on Sunday said "It was noted by our judges that the Daily Mail's coverage of trans issues has improved noticeably since she had lunch with its managing editor".

Lees currently works with All About Trans, a project that tries to bring together journalists and other media professionals with transgender people.

In 2013, Lees topped The Independent on Sunday's Pink List, naming her as the most influential lesbian, gay, bisexual or transgender figure in the UK; she was a judge for that award in 2011 and 2012.

Lees has said that social media is a key tool for transgender people to improve their societal recognition:

People have been taking the piss out of trans people for 60 years. The narrative on trans issues has been controlled by people who have no understanding of them. Social media is about us grabbing the narrative back and telling our own stories – this is our reality, this is what we go through and this is what matters to us. We're here, we're in your face, we definitely exist. That's the most important thing – realising we exist.

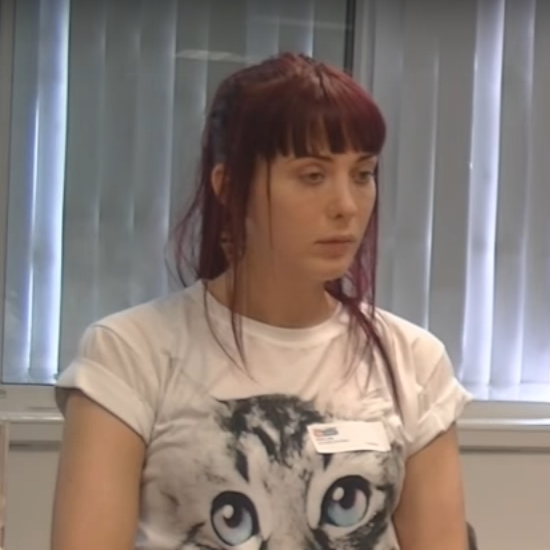
Paris Lees in 2014

Lees also expressed objections to "#fuckcispeople", a controversial trending hashtag on the social networking site Twitter referring to cisgender people, which she thought was counterproductive: "It is much better to engage in a positive dialogue than through angry abuse".

On 11 August 2014, Lees was supposed to be on air with BBC Newsnight recording to talk about the impact of Kellie Maloney coming out as a trans woman. However, Lees refused to be a part of the show as she tweeted that "I've turned down BBC Newsnight as I'm not prepared to enter into a fabricated debate about trans people's right to exist/express themselves".

In November 2014, Lees appeared in Hollyoaks, playing herself, and a friend of the transgender character Blessing Chambers (played by Modupe Adeyeye).

In May 2016 Lees, alongside Brooke Magnanti, was called to give evidence about conditions for sex workers in the UK to the Home Affairs Select Committee investigating prostitution laws in Britain. The resulting recommendations by the committee headed by Keith Vaz, released in July 2016, implemented Lees and Magnanti's suggestions to eliminate criminal records of those arrested for prostitution-related crimes. Sex worker non-profits called the apparent U-turn decision "a stunning victory for sex workers and our demands for decriminalisation" and "a giant step forward for sex workers' rights in the UK".

In June 2020, Lees invited J. K. Rowling to lunch, after the COVID lockdown was over, to introduce her to some young trans people, following the author's comments about transgender people.

=== Other work ===
In 2019, Lees became a brand ambassador for haircare brand Pantene.

== Personal life ==
Lees is a bisexual trans woman and a feminist. Lees has written about how in the early days of her gender transition she received abuse for not passing as female.

In response to the announced gender transition of Chelsea Manning, Lees revealed that as a teenager and before her transition, she had gone to prison for robbery. Lees, who then was living as an effeminate gay male, said of the experience that "looking like a girly boy in an institute full of rough lads wasn't a barrel of laughs", but that prison was less violent than school because other prisoners were more disposed to harming themselves than others.

After her release from prison and being turned down for a part-time job answering phones, Lees described having an epiphany: "When I realised I would like to change society, not myself, all these good things have come into my life". She subsequently received a referral to Charing Cross Hospital's gender identity clinic, and met her boyfriend shortly after beginning hormone replacement therapy.

In 2018 she became the first openly trans woman featured in British Vogue. She later became a columnist with British Vogue in November 2018.

She was also the first openly trans presenter on BBC Radio 1 and Channel 4.

== Awards and nominations ==
Year	Award	Category	Nominated work(s)	Result
2026	British Academy Television Awards	Best Limited Drama	What It Feels Like For a Girl	Nominated
2026	British Academy Television Awards	Memorable Moment	"Bryon leaves for Brighton to start university, where she introduces herself as Paris", from What It Feels Like For a Girl.	Nominated
2026	British Academy Television Craft Awards	Best Writer: Drama	What It Feels Like For a Girl	Nominated

== Bibliography ==
- What It Feels Like For A Girl (2021)

== See also ==
- LGBT rights in the United Kingdom
- Transgender rights in the United Kingdom
