= Fox Fisher =

English artist (born 1980)

Fox Fisher is an English artist, filmmaker, author and transgender rights activist.

== Early life ==
Fisher was born in England on 5 November 1980. At a very young age, their (Note: Fisher is non-binary and uses they/them pronouns.) family moved to Saudi Arabia, where Fisher spent the majority of their childhood, until their family returned to England during their teenage years. Fox is half-Indian, with their mother emigrating from India to the UK at a young age.

Fox graduated from Brighton University with an MA in Sequential Design and Illustration in 2007.

== Activism and career ==
=== LGBTQIA+ activism ===
Fisher first appeared on the mainstream television documentary My Transsexual Summer in 2011. The show centred around the lives of six transgender people in the UK, where they talked about some of the challenges and struggles transgender people faced in the UK.

Since their appearance on My Transsexual Summer, Fisher has become a vocal advocate for transgender rights in the UK and beyond. Following on from the show, Fisher, alongside fellow cast member Lewis Hancox, set up the film project My Genderation, as they both felt that trans people's stories weren't being represented authentically by the mainstream media. They were one of the founders of the first pride event dedicated to transgender people specifically, Trans Pride Brighton.

Fisher is one of the founding members of the project All About Trans, run by On Road Media, that centres around creating positive portrayals of transgender people in the media.

Fisher co-authored and illustrated the book Are You A Boy Or Are You A Girl? with fellow cast member Sarah Savage, and co-authored the book Trans Teen Survival Guide with their partner, Owl Fisher.

In 2018, Fisher appeared on the morning television show Good Morning Britain along with their partner to talk about non-binary issues. The interview was conducted by Piers Morgan and Susanna Reid, and caused deep controversy in the UK press. In Fisher's documentary, I Am They, it was remarked that a planned 4 minute segment became "a fifteen minute feature" and one of the first mainstream media conversations about non-binary issues in the UK.

In June 2020, Fisher and three other authors resigned in protest from the Blair Partnership literary agency also representing J.K. Rowling, when the company refused to issue a public statement of support for transgender rights, saying that "freedom of speech can only be upheld if the structural inequalities that hinder equal opportunities for underrepresented groups are challenged and changed."

== Recognition ==
In 2018, Fisher was awarded an Honorary Doctorate from the University of Brighton for their contribution to raising awareness of transgender issues in the UK and beyond, and their contribution to arts and media.

In 2018, Fisher was awarded an award by the British LGBT awards for Outstanding Contribution to LGBT+ Life.
