= Colonel commandant =

Military title

Colonel commandant is a military title used in the armed forces of some English-speaking countries. The title, not a substantive military rank, could denote a senior colonel with authority over fellow colonels. Today, the holder often has an honorary role outside the executive military structure, such as advocacy for the troops.

== Australia ==
Until 1882, William Acland Douglas, who served in the 50th Regiment, was colonel-commandant of the military forces in Victoria.

Australian formations, such as the Royal Australian Corps of Military Police and the Royal Australian Regiment (RAR), have a colonel commandant, a retired soldier whose role is to act as advocate for the troops' interests. This requires visits to wherever the corps or regiment is deployed.

== Bangladesh ==
In the Bangladesh Army, the post of colonel commandant is an honorary post held by the most senior serving member of a corps or regiment. He is usually a general officer in the rank of lieutenant general or major general. The post is found in all corps and regiments of the army.

== Canada ==
The Canadian Armed Forces widely uses colonels commandant as honorary appointments to act as advocates for members and to advise on relevant policy matters. In reserve regiments there has usually been an honorary colonel and an honorary lieutenant-colonel, while in the Regular Force, the title used is colonel commandant or colonel of the regiment. Many units also have a colonel-in-chief who is often a member of the Royal Family, frequently with a name connection to the regiment. Example: The Queen's York Rangers (First American Regiment) having the Queen and later the Duke of York, as Colonel-in-Chief. In the artillery, the monarch holds this role with the appellation "Captain-General". All of these "honoraries" are in head-of-family roles, approachable in varying degrees by anyone in the "regimental family".

The colonel commandant of the Royal Canadian Armoured Corps, is an appointment given by the Governor General and Commander-in-Chief of Canada to a distinguished retired armoured forces officer. The appointment is for three years, during which the incumbent is on the Canadian Forces' reserve list as the senior officer of the corps. He is responsible for advising the army commander on matters pertaining to the Royal Canadian Armoured Corps. A colonel commandant travels widely to canvass the views of all ranks in the corps and frequently attends military policy conferences, ceremonies and unit celebrations. He is an ex officio member of the Royal Canadian Armoured Corps Association's executive committee.

In 2001, the Canadian Forces Medical Branch canvassed past and present members for nominations to the role of colonel commandant. The role is ceremonial but the colonel commandant acts as a link between the Canadian Forces Medical Branch and the wider civilian medical community. The position is not restricted to former senior medical officers; consideration is given to medical practitioners who are "particularly prominent and well respected within the world of civilian medicine."

== India ==
In India colonel commandant is an honorary 'non-substantive' post, and is usually held by general officers mostly major generals or lieutenant generals. They are elected through secret ballot. Usually the officer would have been once part of the regiment, and in this role he represents the regiment and its men at the higher level of military hierarchy. This is especially in matters related to troop welfare. In photographs where the officer is portrayed as the 'colonel commandant', the rank insignia of a colonel affixed on a maroon/vine red background is used.

In the National Cadet Corps, which is closely connected to Indian universities the vice chancellor of the university is given the honorary rank of 'colonel commandant'. Vice chancellors are eligible to wear the NCC khakhi uniform and wear the insignia, even though they would not have any military experience. In NCC this appointment is purely ceremonial.

== Pakistan ==
In the Pakistan Army the post of colonel commandant is an honorary post held by the most senior serving member of a corps or regiments. They are usually general officers in the rank of major general or lieutenant general. The post is found in all corps and regiments of the army.

== Sri Lanka ==
In the Sri Lankan Army the post of colonel commandant is an honorary post held by the most senior serving member of a corps, he/she is usually a general officer or a brigadier. The post is found in all corps of the army as well as the Mechanized Infantry Regiment and the Sri Lanka National Guard. It is similar in function to that of colonel of the regiment found in multi-battalion infantry regiments.

== United Kingdom ==
In the British Army, the term colonel-commandant goes back at least to the American War of Independence, when it denoted an officer in command of a regiment.

In 1921, the Army abolished the appointment of brigadier-general and replaced it with the new appointments of colonel-commandant and colonel on the staff: Colonels-commandant commanded brigades, depots or training establishments, while colonels on the staff held administrative appointments. Like brigadier-general, both of the new appointments were temporary, the holder reverting to his substantive rank (usually colonel) at the end of his appointment. They were both abolished from 1 June 1928, replaced by the appointment of brigadier (though the rank insignia – a crown over three "pips" or stars – remained the same). The Indian Army used the same appointments.

In the Royal Marines, the appointments of colonel commandant and colonel & 2nd commandant dated back to 1755, when fifty companies of marines were raised in three divisions: each division had a colonel commandant and a colonel & 2nd commandant. From 1755 until the end of the Napoleonic era, the appointment of colonel & 2nd commandant was usually held by a lieutenant-colonel, colonel, or major-general, while the appointment of colonel commandant was held by a colonel or above, but only very rarely by a full general. The Royal Marines adopted the appointment of brigadier-general to be held by its colonels commandant (then five in number) in 1913, and dispensed with it again in 1921. Like the Army, the Royal Marines adopted the appointment of brigadier in 1928, but the ranks of colonel commandant and colonel 2nd commandant persisted at least as far as World War II. By 1957, however, they had been abolished and replaced with brigadier (now a rank instead of an appointment, as in the Army) and colonel.

The title of colonel-commandant is now used as an honorary or ceremonial title relating to a military corps. For example, General Sir Richard Dannatt was Colonel-Commandant of the Army Air Corps as well as his full-time role as Chief of the General Staff while Brigadier Jane Arigho, a retired Director of Army Nursing Services and Lieutenant-Colonel Carol Kefford, also a retired QARANC officer, are the Colonel-Commandants of Queen Alexandra's Royal Army Nursing Corps.

== United States ==
In 1779, Hungarian-born Colonel Commandant Michael Kovats died leading the Continental Army cavalry against British troops at Charleston.

The highest-ranking officer of the United States Marine Corps was formerly titled Colonel Commandant: the title now is simply Commandant. Colonel-Commandant was also used for Lloyd J. Beall, the commanding officer of the short-lived Confederate States Marine Corps during the American Civil War.

At the Alamo, William B. Travis was given the position of lieutenant colonel commandant.
