= Harold Watson (New Zealand cricketer) =

New Zealand cricketer (1879–1958)

Personal information
- Full name: Harold Cooper Watson
- Born: 24 December 1879; Calverton, Nottinghamshire, England
- Died: 2 July 1958 (aged 78); Auckland, New Zealand
- Batting: Right-handed
- Relatives: Leo Watson (brother)

Domestic team information
- Years: Team
- 1907/08–1914/15: Otago
- 1917/18: Canterbury
- 1923/24: Wellington
- Source: CricInfo, 26 May 2016

Harold Cooper Watson (24 December 1879 – 2 July 1958) was an English-born cricketer and cricket coach. He played first-class cricket in New Zealand for Otago, Canterbury, and Wellington between the 1907–08 and 1923–24 seasons.

Watson was born at Calverton in the English county of Nottinghamshire in 1879. He grew up in Lancashire where his father was a groundsman and the younger Watson played for Clifton Cricket Club in Salford. He emigrated to New Zealand in 1905 and after living at Huntly south of Auckland for a year, was employed as groundsman at the Carisbrook ground in Dunedin, replacing George Mills. He arrived in the city in mid-1906.

Considered a "fine batsman" who played club cricket for Carisbrook, Watson made his representative debut for the Otago provincial side during the 1907–08 season. Other than a score of 40 made on debut, his batting was disappointing, although the innings against Canterbury was praised as "splendid". The Press, a Christchurch paper, described the innings as "capital all-round batting" with many "first-class" strokes and considered him "one of Otago's best batsmen". The innings was part of an Otago eighth-wicket record partnership of 75 with Alfred Eckhold.

Despite his reputation, Watson only played one match for the side the following season and did not appear again for Otago until 1913–14. In total he played nine first-class matches for the side, scoring 198 runs and taking three wickets. The 40 runs he scored on debut remained his highest first-class score.

The wickets Watson prepared at Carisbrook were soon considered "excellent", and by 1910 he had begun to coach Carisbrook club sides. In 1916 he left Dunedin to take up a position as the cricket coach at Christ's College in Christchurch, coaching amongst others future New Zealand Test match captain Tom Lowry and batsman Roger Blunt. He played for the West Christchurch club and made a single first-class appearance for Canterbury in a December 1917 match against Otago. By December 1918 he was taking charge of coaching the Canterbury representative side and in the winter of 1919 he set up an indoor cricket school in Christchurch, something considered "quite a novelty" in the city.

By the end of 1921, Watson had moved to Wellington where he coached the representative side. He visited England to visit sports manufacturers during 1922 and played a single first-class match for the Wellington representative side during the 1923–24 season, scoring 29 runs against Otago at Carisbrook.

Watson later moved to farm on the North Island. He died at Auckland in 1958 aged 78. An obituary was published in the 1958 edition of the New Zealand Cricket Almanack. His brother, Leo Watson, also played cricket, making a single first-class appearance for Otago during the 1911–12 season.
