= We Are the Champ =

Studio album by the Loungs
- Released: 21 May 2007
- Recorded: May–October 2006 at Catalyst Studios, St. Helens
- Genre: Indie, pop
- Label: Akoustik Anarkhy
- Producer: The Loungs/Andy Bowes

Professional ratings
Review scores
Source	Rating
MusicOMH	link
NME	link

We Are the Champ is the debut album by the Loungs, released on 21 May 2007 on the Akoustik Anarkhy label. It was recorded and produced by the Loungs and Andy Bowes at Catalyst Studios, St. Helens. It features re-recorded versions of both sides of the band's debut single ("I'm Gonna Take Your Girl" and "Seen My Baby Dancing"), and the lead tracks from their second ("Armageddon Outta Here") and third ("Googly Moogly").

The album was released on 12-inch vinyl, CD digipack and download. The download was available ahead of the physical release – from 23 April.

== Track listing ==
1. "Clancy's Stomp"
2. "Electric Lights"
3. "Armageddon Outta Here"
4. "Smile Reptile"
5. "Throughout It All"
6. "Googly Moogly"
7. "Get Along"
8. "I'm Gonna Take Your Girl"
9. "Leep"
10. "Dig That Do"
11. "All Your Love"
12. "Seen My Baby Dancing"
13. "In Winter Coats"

== Additional musicians ==
- Paul Brennan – trombone
- David Geoghegan – trumpet
- Paul Swannell – violin and string arrangement
- Esther DeJong – violin
- Alex Fletcher – viola
- Aileen Williams – cello
