= St Helens College =

Further education college in St Helens, Merseyside, England

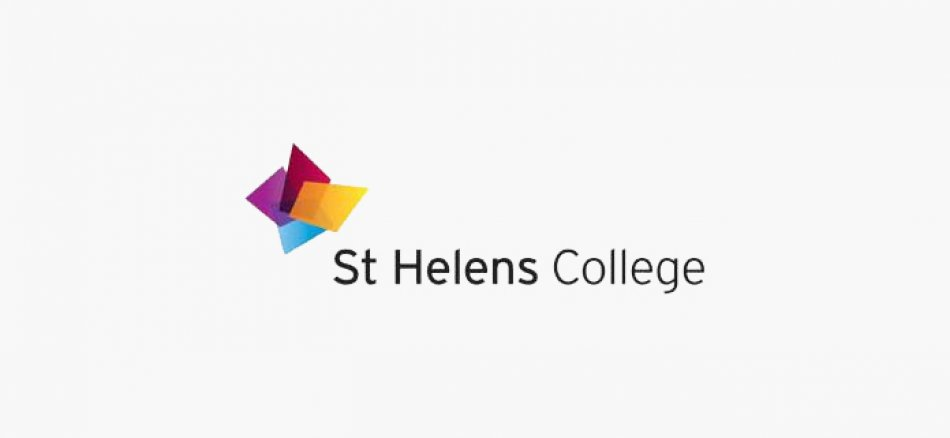

Location
- Water Street; St Helens, Merseyside, WA10 1PP; United Kingdom; 53.452658°N 2.741380°W

Information
- Type: General Further education college
- Established: 1896
- Local authority: St Helens
- Department for Education URN: 130488 Tables
- Ofsted: Reports
- Gender: Coeducational
- Age: 16+
- Website: http://www.sthelens.ac.uk/

St Helens College is a further education college serving the borough of St Helens. In 2009/10 it had 2,193 full-time adult learners aged 16–18 plus another 585 part-time learners. It had 541 full-time adult learners (age 19+), plus another 3,215 part-time adult learners. The total number of enrolments in 2009/10, including 14-16, FE, foundation learning, entry to employment, adult learners, and apprenticeships was 11,408 benefit claimants.

The College provides a wide range of both further and higher education programmes, including qualifications for City and Guilds, National Diplomas, National Awards, National Certificates and NVQs; it also offers honours and foundation degrees validated through established partnerships with universities, including Central Lancashire, Edge Hill, Huddersfield, Liverpool John Moores, Salford and Sheffield Hallam.

There are a number of entry-level qualifications available. The college traces its foundation to 1896 when it was the town's Gamble Institute, created by philanthropic mayor Sir David Gamble to provide a home of education for the rising generations. After substantial growth and expansion, the institute became the town's Technical College in 1959 and merged with Newton College in 1986. The purpose-built Technology centre began construction the same year.

St Helens College is a member of the Collab Group of high performing schools. A report following a 2006 Ofsted inspection awarded the college a Grade 2 (good).

== Centres ==
The college has two campuses: one in the Town Centre and one in the Technology Centre at Pocket Nook.

== Development ==
St Helens College underwent a £62m rebuild and modernisation programme at its Town Centre Campus as part of a government-funded "Building Colleges for the Future Programme". Over £30m was spent on phase 1, which was completed in July 2009. The 1959 Brutalist building was demolished and replaced by an insipid modern structure, and the existing SmithKline Beecham building was refurbished. Building work commenced in January 2008, and was completed in 2011. The development was undertaken in stages in order to avoid disruption to students, staff, and local businesses. Thomas Beecham's listed clock-tower building, which is one of the town's most popular landmarks, remains an integral part of the campus.

== Notable alumni ==
- Louise Glover, glamour model and beauty pageant titleholder
- Lewis Hancox, graphic novelist, social media personality and filmmaker
- David Yates, filmmaker
