= Sweatmother =

British Filmmaker

Sweatmother is a Latinx filmmaker and artist, and founder of the Otherness Archive. He is a co-organiser of London Trans+ Pride and his work focuses on queer bodies and sexuality through archival footage and experimental video techniques, including 'triple-baking' using a video synthesiser.

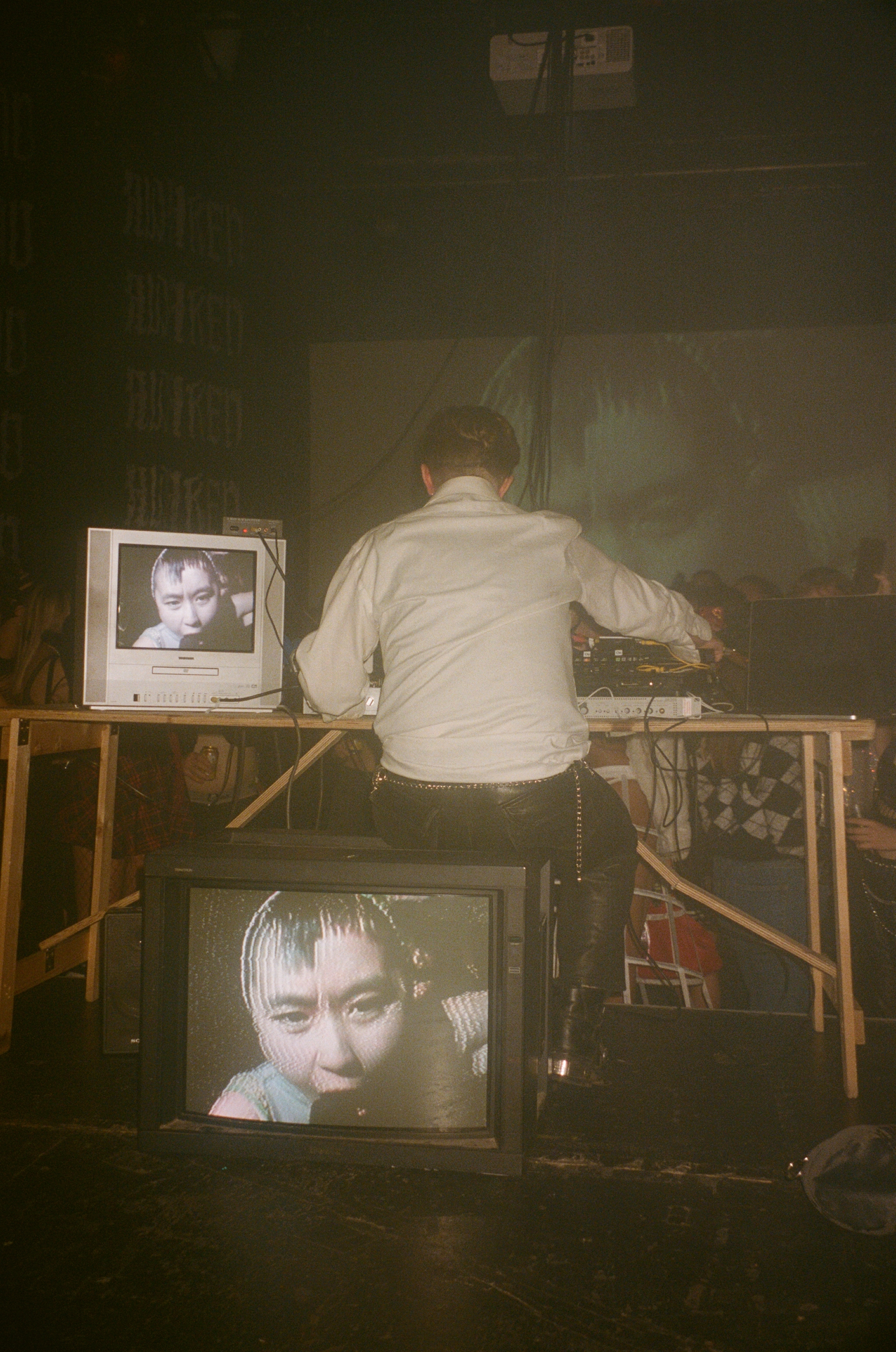
Sweatmother performing at INFERNO rave live, 2022.

== Career ==
Sweatmother is an independent experimental filmmaker, artist and performer based in London. Sweatmother's work documents contemporary queer life experience and community. His documentation of trans and queer protest in London was shown as part of the 'Disobedience Archive' at the Venice Biennial Arte 2024

Sweatmother created visuals for Kylie Minogue's 2023 Las Vegas Residency, for the opening night of Christine and the Queens' Meltdown Festival in 2023 in London, and for experimental queer musician aya's live show. Sweatmother is a long-term resident artist of queer rave INFERNO, creating films and club visuals. His expanded cinema performance solo debut Dyke, Just Do It, premiered in 2023 with two sold out performances at ICA.

== Otherness Archive ==
Sweatmother created and maintains the Otherness Archive, launched in January 2023, an online collection of queer archival films and new works from contemporary queer filmmakers. Approximately 500 films are currently available. Sweatmother has claimed that the "Otherness Archive defies the historic censorship of homosexual, trans and racial themes, and instead highlights them as representations of otherness that deserve equal, if not greater, recognition." It has so far focused on films related to a trans-masculine queer experience.
