= All About Trans =

British transgender organisation

- Mission statement: "Positively changing how the media understands and portrays transgender people"
- Commercial?: No
- Owner: On Road Media
- Founder: Nathalie McDermott
- Country: United Kingdom
- Established: 2011
- Status: Active
- Website: allabouttrans.org.uk

All About Trans is a project that aims to improve how the media understands and portrays transgender people. Its aim is to "promote trans voices in the media" and engage media professionals (such as journalists, presenters and editors) and other sector professionals with trans topics in creative ways.

The project is managed by On Road Media, a charity that "tackles social problems by improving media coverage of misrepresented groups and issues". All About Trans is supported and led by an advisory group made up of individuals and organisations from within the trans community and consultants including journalist Paris Lees, filmmaker Fox Fisher and pilot Ayla Holdom.

The work is funded and supported by the Esmée Fairbairn Foundation and the Paul Hamlyn Foundation. Previous funders include the BBC and Channel 4.

== History ==
All About Trans, originally named Trans Media Action, began in October 2011. It was prompted by the director of On Road, Nathalie McDermott, witnessing the death of human rights lawyer and trans woman Sonia Burgess, when she was pushed from a platform at London's Kings Cross railway station during rush hour. The ensuing media coverage of her death alerted On Road to the appalling treatment of trans people in the media. Having become aware of the poor coverage of transgender people, McDermott approached members of the voluntary watchdog organisation Trans Media Watch, a charity that focuses on changing the media representation and reporting of trans people, to improve this representation.

== Activities ==
=== Interactions ===
All About Trans sets up interactions between media professionals and trans and non-binary individuals. An interaction is a relaxed, social meet-up between a senior media or sector professional and someone with personal experiences to share. It is designed to encourage a greater understanding of the community, leading to better and more empathetic portrayals of trans people in the media.

By 2015, All About Trans has worked with over 200 trans and gender variant people of all ages and over nearly 350 media and other sector professionals from a range of media organisations across the UK. These include The Observer, The Independent, The Sun, Daily Mail, Channel 4, the BBC, Press Complaints Commission, Press Association. In 2015, All About Trans met with the New Statesman, and The Mail on Sunday.

=== Trans Camp ===
Trans Camp took place in January 2012. The day was dedicated to exploring creative solutions to major stumbling blocks in the media's portrayal of this often misrepresented and misunderstood community.

Held at Channel 4, Trans Camp hosted over 60 innovators, developers, entrepreneurs, designers, media professionals and trans people from varied backgrounds to come up with ideas to address how the media portrayed trans people.

== Accomplishments ==
=== Hollyoaks ===
All About Trans has met more than once with the Hollyoaks team. Following a large interaction in 2014, the cast and crew asked members of the trans community to advise them on their trans storyline between the characters Blessing and Dennis. All About Trans supported them with casting workshops, leading to a new storyline in 2015 with new character Mrs St Claire played by Annie Wallace. Filmmaker Lewis Hancox produced two backstage videos about trans experiences for the Channel 4 website. Paris Lees made a cameo appearance alongside the character Blessing in November 2014.

=== Dr Kate Stone's press negotiations ===
Sarah Lennox, an adviser for All About Trans, worked with Dr. Kate Stone on a negotiation with the Press Complaints Commission (now Independent Press Standards Organisation) and several mainstream UK newspapers in 2014. This was following her trans status being revealed in articles about being attacked by a stag whilst on holiday. Terms including 'sex swap' were used in these reports. The six papers amended their stories and accepted that they were in breach of Clause 12 of the PCC's Editor's Code of Practice. These were the Daily Mirror, the Scottish edition of The Sun, the Daily Record, the Daily Mail, and The Daily Telegraph. The statements by each newspaper were reported by the PCC.

Yvonne Roberts outlined the background and context of Stone's negotiation in The Observer, while the story was picked up by several news outlets, such as BBC News, Press Gazette, The Guardian, the Radio 4 The Media Show, and by Channel 4 News.

=== Boy Meets Girl ===
One of the outcomes of Trans Camp was the Trans Comedy Award. This concept was developed during the day by participants, some of whom went on to work in partnership with BBC Writersroom on a new initiative to encourage sensitive and accurate portrayals of trans characters in comedy scripts. The winning script Boy Meets Girl, written by Elliott Kerrigan, was made into a pilot by Tiger Aspect commissioned by BBC Two in the summer of 2014. Before its release on television, it was one of four pilots to be showcased at the Salford Comedy Festival. It was then broadcast on BBC Two, Thursday 3 September 2015.

Boy Meets Girl comprised six 30-minute episodes; it aired on BBC Two from 3 September to 10 October 2015. It was set in Newcastle, and starred Rebecca Root as Judy and Harry Hepple as Leo. Both Root and her character Judy are transgender, making this the first BBC comedy to feature a transgender character in a lead role, and the first sitcom to feature a transgender actor playing a transgender character. The series focused on Judy and Leo's relationship, the age gap between the two and their "endearingly eccentric families".

At the 2015 Stonewall Awards the show received the Trans Media Award for bringing trans issues to British prime time television. Elliot Kerrigan won a Royal Television Society Rising Star Award for Boy Meets Girl in February 2016. Rebecca Root was awarded the Breakthrough Performance Award at the Attitude Awards in October 2015 for her role in the sitcom.

In October 2015, it was announced that Boy Meets Girl would be returning for a second series. This consisted of six episodes, broadcast 6 July to 4 August 2016. Rebecca Root, playing the role of Judy, has since become All About Trans' Patron.

=== My Trans Story / Patchwork: Real People ===
Patchwork: Real People is the digital storytelling side project of All About Trans. This is a collection of digital media stories from trans people across the UK. All these stories focus on the themes of "support" and "celebration".

In December 2013, All About Trans joined with Lucky Tooth Films (with their side project My Genderation) to create a collection of films with support from Channel 4. Throughout the following year, Fox Fisher and Lewis Hancox filmed with 25 trans and gender variant people across the UK. Each short documentary features a trans person talking about their life, their experiences, passions and hopes.

The shorts were produced by All About Trans and made available as ‘My Trans Story' in October 2015 on All Four, the Channel 4 on demand service and ‘Am I Normal', the Channel 4 project that explores the idea through films, clips and advice, that there is "no normal".

=== Transgender soap characters ===
All About Trans has been credited with the 2015 introduction of two new transgender characters played by transgender people on British soaps, following interactions held with both soap's writing teams. Hollyoaks introduced 'Mrs Sally St. Claire', played by transgender actress Annie Wallace, and EastEnders have introduced 'Kyle', the brother of 'Stacey Branning', played by trans actor Riley Carter Millington. This credit was reinforced with Riley Carter Millington topping The Independent On Sunday Rainbow List in 2015. The feature article accompanying the announcement stated that the "sea of change in the representation of transgender people in the media [was]as a result of tireless campaigning by groups such as All About Trans".

=== I Am Leo ===
After the All About Trans interaction with CBBC, I Am Leo, a BAFTA-winning documentary focusing on a trans child named Leo, was developed.

=== Listening Project ===
In 2015, four volunteers worked with All About Trans and BBC Radio 4 to record clips for the Listening Project and the British Library. The first of these was broadcast on BBC Radio 4 on 18 and 22 November. Paris Lees also presented three BBC Radio 1 documentaries after the All About Trans meeting with BBC Radio 1 Commissioning Editor Piers Bradford. The documentaries were called Staying Out, My Transgender Punk Rock Story and The Hate Debate.

=== Media infographic ===
Volunteer and artist Sophie Green worked with All About Trans alongside Robin Esser, Managing Editor, from the Daily Mail, and the All About Trans Advisory Group to create an infographic that gives media professionals tips when writing about trans matters. This has been shared and mentioned in mainstream media.

== Press ==
All About Trans' work has been written about by journalists such as Cathy Newman, Radhika Sanghani and Owen Jones. These and further articles appeared in newspapers and news outlets such as the Bournemouth Echo and the Glasgow Herald. Paris Lees also writes for a variety of organisations that All About Trans met with, including The Guardian, and the Telegraph.

Some All About Trans participants have written or blogged for the Glasgow Herald, the Dorset Echo, and The Observer following interactions with the papers.

== See also ==
- Anti-transgender movement in the United Kingdom
- LGBTQ people in the United Kingdom
- Normalization (sociology)
- Transgender history in the United Kingdom
- Transgender rights in the United Kingdom
- Transphobia
- Transsexual
