= The Loungs =

British indie rock band

Background information
- Origin: St Helens, England
- Genres: Rock, pop, psychedelic
- Years active: 2003–present
- Label: Fresh Hair Records
- Members: Jamie Atherton; Neil Conway; Gaz Pickett; Martin Wills; Paul Nicholson

The Loungs are an indie rock band from St Helens, Merseyside, in the North-West of England. Their debut album We Are The Champ was released in 2007 on Manchester's Akoustik Anarkhy label and the follow-up Big Wow in 2010 on Fresh Hair Records. Both albums were highly acclaimed throughout the music press and the band have gigged extensively across the UK since their inception.

During 2009/2010 the band give away free 'B-Sides' to members of their online mailing list and the songs eventually formed a download only album entitled B-Sides to Non-Existent A-Sides.

The band released their 3rd studio album, entitled Short Cuts released through Fresh Hair Records on 6 November 2015.

== History ==
=== Early years ===
The Loungs were formed in 2003 by Jamie, Dan and Neil, who had been friends at school. They found drummer Gaz outside a takeaway, asked him to join the band, and set out gigging. They recruited keyboard player Martin and guitarist Paul in 2004. The band's first gig as a six-piece was on 24 April 2004 at the "Groovy Festival" at Liverpool St Helens Football Club.

The Loungs established a reputation via a series of gigs throughout the UK, playing with Arctic Monkeys, The Bees, Sondre Lerche, Noisettes, Good Shoes, Yeti, The Basement, The Rakes, 10,000 Things, Moco, Clap Your Hands Say Yeah, The Redwalls, Zabrinski, The Harrisons, Gintis, Vinny Peculiar and Jim Noir, amongst others. During this time, they self-released an EP called Learning is Fun with The Loungs.

=== Akoustik Anarkhy ===
In late 2005, they became involved with the Manchester-based Akoustik Anarkhy record label, which led to the releasing of their debut single "I'm Gonna Take Your Girl" in February 2006 to rave reviews throughout the music press. During this time the band were picked amongst 14 finalists as a part of Channel 4's The Road To V competition and a live performance and interview were featured on the Channel 4 programme of the same name. The Loungs also donated a demo version of their track "All Your Love" to Lupine Recordings' debut compilation Tales From The Lux in October 2006.

Their next single "Armageddon Outta Here/Cats" followed in April 2007.

=== We Are The Champ ===
The Loungs' debut album We Are The Champ was released in May 2007 to widespread critical acclaim and was described as "Joyous" (Uncut Magazine), "Gloriously rowdy" (Q Magazine) "One of the most exhausting but enjoyable 34 minutes you'll spend listening to music this year" (NME) and "The best thing to come out of St.Helens since the East Lancs road" (The Word) amongst many others.

Summer 2007 saw The Loungs appear at many festivals throughout the UK including Glastonbury, Knowsley Hall Music Festival, Bestival and Beat Herder.

Their next single "Googly Moogly/Jimmy Two Shoes" followed in October 2007.

=== Big Wow ===
The Loungs split from Akoustik Anarkhy at the end of 2007.

They spent 2008 working on their second album at Catalyst Studios in St. Helens and gigging regularly throughout the UK appearing at many festivals throughout the summer. A new song "Jack Sarfatti" appeared in June 2008 on USB stick attached to the cover of Amelia's Magazine which featured bands performing specially written songs on the subject of 'the future'.

The band's second album Big Wow was released in March 2010 and featured 12 new songs. Alongside the album the band created 12 promotional videos to accompany each track which can be seen on the Fresh Hair Records YouTube page.

=== B-Sides To Non-Existent A-Sides ===
Throughout 2009/2010 the band released a series of monthly recordings to the members of their mailing list. In May 2011 the recordings where sequenced together as a free download only album B-Sides To Non-Existent A-Sides.

=== Short Cuts ===
The Loungs released their 3rd album proper, entitled Short Cuts, through Fresh Hair Records in November 2015.

=== Hey, Brain!/Kite ===
During lockdown in 2020, the band released two new songs through Fresh Hair Records via Bandcamp. The tracks were also accompanied by two videos via YouTube.

== Discography ==
=== Albums ===
- We Are The Champ - released 21 May 2007 on Akoustik Anarkhy 12" vinyl, CD Digipack and Download. Download available from 23 April 2007.
- Big Wow - released 8 March 2010 on Fresh Hair Records CD and download.
- B-Sides To Non-Existent A-Sides - released 17 May 2011 on Fresh Hair Records. Download only collection of B-Sides & Demos.
- Short Cuts - released 6 November 2015 on Fresh Hair Records CD and download.

=== Singles ===
- I'm Gonna Take Your Girl/Seen My Baby Dancin' - released 28 February 2006 on Akoustik Anarkhy 7" and Download
- Armageddon Outta Here/Cats - released 2 April 2007 on Akoustik Anarkhy 7" and Download
- Googly Moogly/Jimmy Two Shoes - released 15 October 2007 on Akoustik Anarkhy 7" and Download
- Hey, Brain!/Kite - released 8 May 2020 on Fresh Hair Records Download via Bandcamp

=== Self-released CDs ===
- The "Learning Is Fun With The Loungs" EP - released 26 January 2005

=== Download ===
- B-Sides to Non-Existent A-Sides - Collection of free downloads originally available through The Loungs' mailing list and now available as a download only album.

=== Compilations ===
- Tales From The Lux - released 30 October 2006 on Lupine Records 10" - features "All Your Love"
- Thermal 2007 - released September 2007 via Thermal Festival and limited to 100 copies - features "Armageddon Outta Here"
- Amelia's Magazine - released May 2008 - USB stick attached to magazine - features "Jack Sarfatti"
- Registered - released September 2008 - Free CD created by the electoral services unit in order to promote young people to use their vote in Manchester - features "Dig That Do"
- Cloud Sounds Compilation - released December 2008 - CD - features "Cloud Sounds Jingle" + "Jimmy Two Shoes"

== TV and Film ==
- Hollyoaks - the Channel 4 series featured the song "Sunbeat" during an episode aired 12/03/12.
- Waterloo Road - the BBC1 drama featured the songs "All Your Love" and "Clancy's Stomp" in series 3, episode 3.
- The Road To V - the Channel 4 series featured the songs "Clancy's Stomp" and "I'm Gonna Take Your Girl" and an interview with the band.
