= London Trans+ Pride =

Annual transgender pride march in England

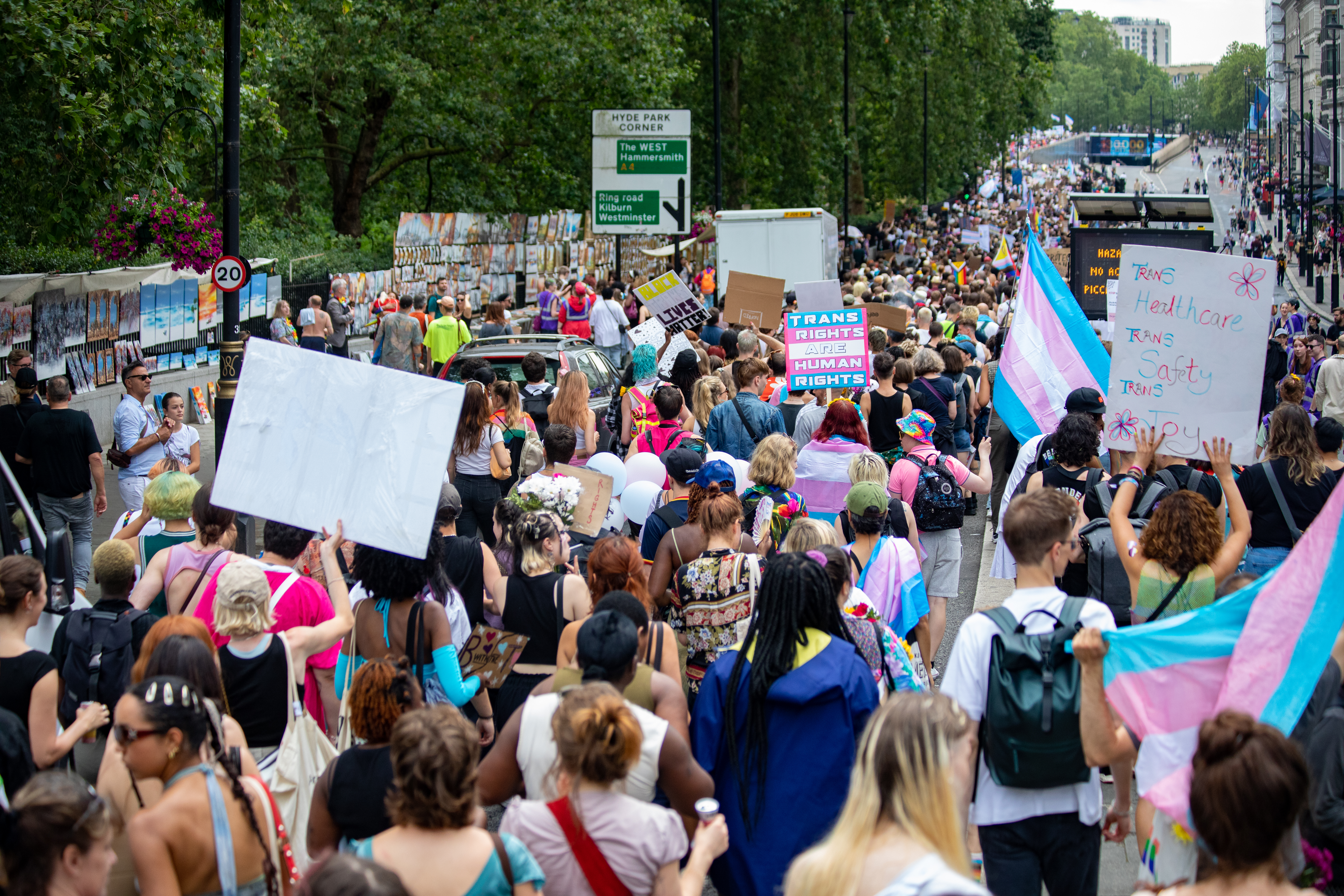
- Trans+, 2023
- Frequency: Annually
- Inaugurated: 14 September 2019
- Previous event: 25 July 2026
- Attendance: 150,000+
- Website: https://londontranspride.org/

London Trans+ Pride is a pride march advocating transgender rights held in London, England. It first happened on 14 September 2019, but then moved to the fourth Saturday in July.

== History ==
London Trans+ Pride was co-founded in 2019 by a collective group of trans+ people including Lucia Blayke and Finn Love, inspired by Trans Pride Brighton. It was founded in part due to a rising climate of transphobia in the UK and across the world, as well as in response to an anti-transgender protest controversy that occurred at the Pride in London march in 2018, where eight anti-trans activists took the lead of the march without authorisation. The event was originally scheduled to take place in Hackney, in East London but was moved to Westminster in central London and has remained there in subsequent years. The current route goes from Langham Place near Broadcasting House, to Parliament Square.

Since 2019, London Trans+ Pride has been run by a volunteer organising committee which includes EM Williams, Sweatmother, Ren Mars, Lewis G. Burton, Mx Adam Khan as well as many who have wished to remain anonymous. In addition to the yearly protest, London Trans+ Pride march, they also hold additional events for trans advocacy including a takeover of the NOMAD stage at Glastonbury Festival in 2022, 2023 and 2024.

== Attendance ==
Attendance by year
Year	Attendance	Notes
2019	1,500	First year.
2020	4,000	A number of COVID-19 safety measures were put in place by the organisers, and called for legal recognition of non-binary identities and a ban on intersex genital mutilation. It also included a memorial to Elie Che, a prominent transgender London activist and performer who died in August of that year.
2021	7,500	The event included speeches by Munroe Bergdorf, Ki Griffin, Bimini Bon-Boulash, Abigail Thorn, and Kai-Isaiah Jamal.
2022	20,000	The event called to "celebrate the memory of trans lives taken and uphold the next generation of trans revolutionaries," and included speeches by Yasmin Finney and Charlie Craggs. Abigail Thorn said at the event that "legally and politically", trans people in the country "are not allowed to control our own lives".
2023	25,000 to 35,000	The organisers emphasised the event was still a protest in what was called the "biggest ever" call for trans rights in the UK.
2024	55,000 to 60,000	This year's march was motivated in part by the British government's recently enacted ban on puberty blockers, making it the biggest trans pride march in the world.
2025	100,000	Surpassed the previous year's event as the biggest trans pride march in the world.
2026	150,000	Surpassed the previous year's event as the biggest trans pride march in the world and included speeches by writer Juno Dawson and actress Hannah Jones, was attended by 150,000 people, according to its organisers.

== See also ==
- LGBTQ culture in London
- Trans Pride Brighton
- Transgender rights in the United Kingdom
- 21st-century anti-trans movement in the United Kingdom
