= Gaywise Festival =

London LGBT arts event

GFEST - Gaywise FESTival is an LGBT annual cross-arts festival in London, England. It is a platform for lesbian, gay, bisexual, transgender and queer artists, organizations and venues to promote LGBT and queer arts.

Organized by the arts charity Wise Thoughts, GFEST features queer artists and talented individuals specializing in various forms of art, including visual art, theatre, dance and performance, and short films. The festival also hosts debates, workshops, and parties.

In 2010, over 100 artists and 8,000 individuals took part in GFEST 10. The launches of GFEST 08, 09 and 10 took place at the Palace of Westminster; LGBT 08 was the first LGBT arts initiative launched at the House of Commons.

GFEST 2011 was held from 7 to 20 November 2011, the fifth year in which the festival was hosted.

The festival's artistic director was CEO and Artistic Director of Wise Thoughts, Niranjan Kamatkar.

The events of the 13th year of GFEST - Gaywise FESTival 2020 were presented online for the first time in precautionary response to the COVID-19 pandemic. Between 9 and 21 November 2020, daily publishing of over a dozen filmed stories and recordings of live webinars with BAME and LGBTQI+ people from across the UK were presented online.
