= Carol Kefford =

Senior British Army nurse

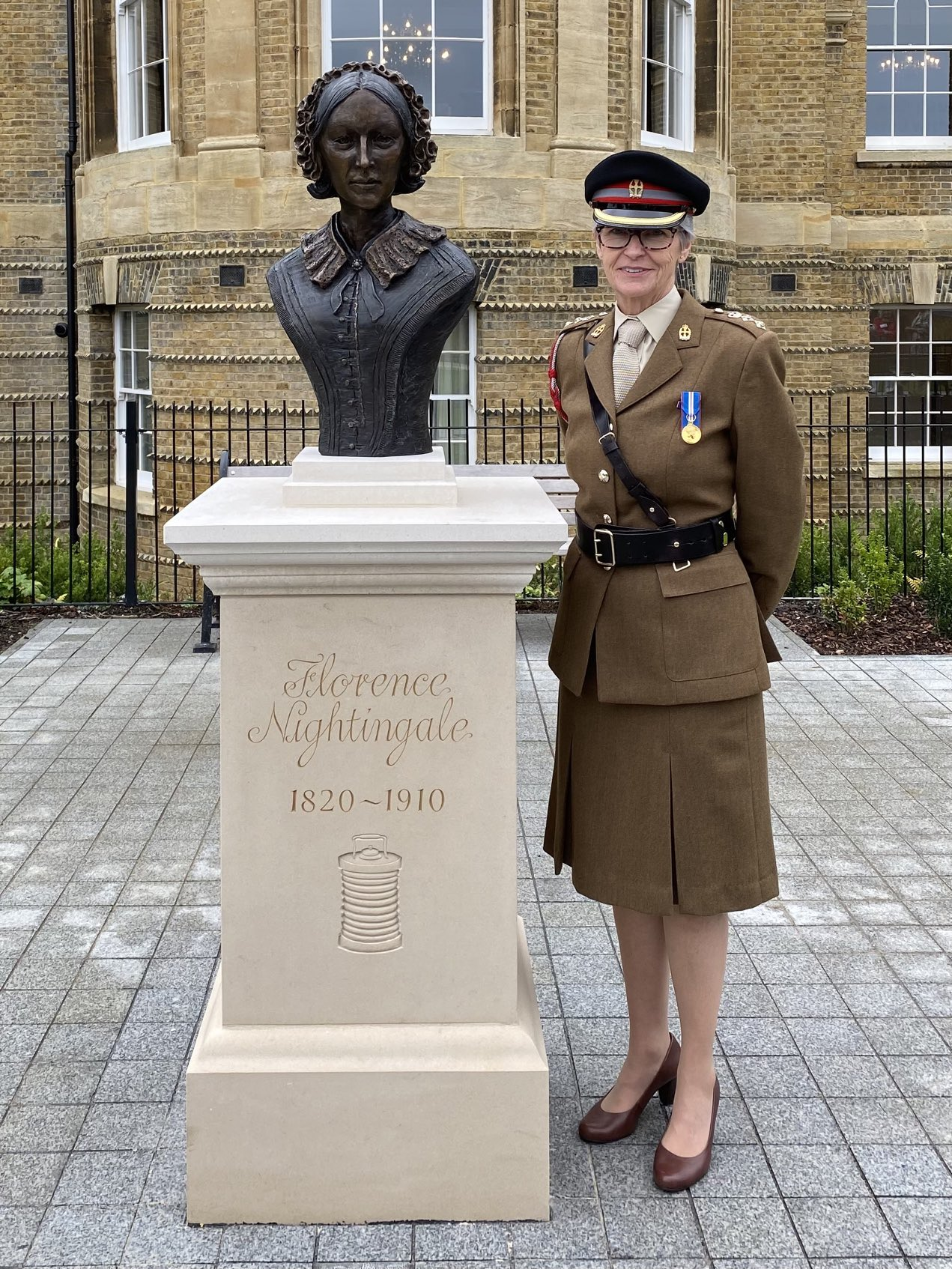
Colonel Commandant Carol Kefford at the unveiling of a bust of Florence Nightingale at the former Cambridge Military Hospital in Aldershot (2021)

Carol Margaret Kefford OBE (née Poulten; born 1958) is a British nurse who has served as Clinical Director and Chief Nurse for Nuffield Health (May 2017–October 2021) and since 2017 is a Colonel Commandant of the Queen Alexandra's Royal Army Nursing Corps (QARANC). She is currently the Chief Nursing Executive for HCA Healthcare UK.

== Early life ==
Born in 1958 in St Helens, Merseyside, the daughter of Gilbert Henry Poulten (1922–1999) and Margaret née Royle, she trained as a nurse in Oxford and worked as a registered nurse in the NHS from 1976 to 1982

== Military service ==
In 1981 Kefford was promoted to Lieutenant in the Queen Alexandra's Royal Army Nursing Corps (QARANC) in the Territorial and Army Volunteer Reserve.

She served as a Nursing Officer in the British Army for 20 years from 1982 to 2003. Early in her army nursing career she was posted to the Cambridge Military Hospital in Aldershot in Hampshire. In April 1988 Captain Carol Poulten was re-instated from the Reserve of Officers to be a Captain in the QARANC (Regular Army). She married Michael Kefford in Hampshire in 1992.

From 2001 to 2003 she served as a Lieutenant Colonel in 202 Midlands Field Hospital RAMC (V), leading a 100 strong Nursing Squadron in preparation to becoming the first Territorial Army Field Hospital on 30 days notice-to-deploy with 200 beds to Iraq. During her military nursing career Kefford was posted to Hong Kong and Nepal and in addition worked in nursing recruitment and training.

== Later life ==
She left the Army in 2003 to work for the healthcare charity Nuffield Health, serving as Matron in its hospital in Oxford. later working for Nuffield in regional governance followed by a period as hospital director of Nuffield's hospital in Bristol. She cites Florence Nightingale and Mary Quant as influences.

Kefford took the brave step to leave Nuffield and her nursing career to fulfil a personal ambition to sail across the Atlantic and Pacific. During her seven-year trip she travelled 40,000 nautical miles (or about 7,400 km) from Trinidad to Australia. On her return she re-joined Nuffield Health as Clinical Director and Chief Nurse, a role she held from 2017 to 2021 which made her accountable for the quality of clinical care delivered to Nuffield's patients across its various medical sites.

In 2017 she succeeded Colonel Susan Bush as Colonel Commandant of Queen Alexandra's Royal Army Nursing Corps. The rank of Colonel Commandant is an honorary appointment within a corps or regiment of the British Army given to a retired senior officer of the Corps, who is appointed by the Military Secretary after the appointment has been approved by Queen Elizabeth II. On her appointment Kefford was received by Sophie, Countess of Wessex, the Colonel-in-Chief. Since October 2021 she has been the Chief Nursing Executive for HCA Healthcare UK with responsibility for 'overseeing the development of the organisation's "nursing strategy" and the career management of nursing and allied health professionals (AHPs).'

For HCA Kefford leads a team consisting of nine chief nursing officers, 1,700 nursing professionals and nearly 1,000 AHPs across HCA's UK network of hospitals, outpatient centres and specialist clinics.

Kefford was appointed Officer of the Order of the British Empire (OBE) in the 2023 New Year Honours for services to nursing.

== Education and training ==
Kefford is a Florence Nightingale Foundation Senior Leadership Scholar. She took an MBA at Henley Business School (1999–2003); while at the University of Manchester she obtained a first class BSc degree in Health Service Management (1995–1998).
