= Leo Watson (cricketer) =

New Zealand cricketer

Personal information
- Full name: Leo Cooper Watson
- Born: 30 July 1885; St Helens, Lancashire, England
- Died: 21 November 1961 (aged 76); Christchurch, Canterbury, New Zealand
- Relatives: Harold Watson (brother)

Domestic team information
- Years: Team
- 1911/12: Otago
- Source: CricInfo, 27 May 2016

Leo Cooper Watson (30 July 1885 – 21 November 1961) was an English-born cricketer. He played one first-class match in New Zealand for Otago during the 1911–12 season.

Watson was born at St Helens in Lancashire in 1885. His father was a groundsman in the county and the family lived at Salford for a time where his older brother, Harold, played cricket before migrating to New Zealand in 1905.

Leo Watson followed his brother to the Dominion in 1909, leaving London on the SS Turakina and played cricket for the Carisbrook club in Dunedin before leaving for Wellington the following year. By 1911 he was living at Christchurch and playing club cricket for the Sydenham club. His only first-class match was a December 1910 fixture between Otago and Canterbury played at Lancaster Park in Christchurch. Watson scored 10 runs in each innings and did not bowl.

Watson went on to play for and captain the Sunnyside club at Papanui in Christchurch. He grew tomatoes for a living and died in the city in 1961 at the age of 76.
