= Trans Media Watch =

British charity

- Abbreviation: TMW
- Formation: 2009
- Type: Charitable organisation
- Registration no.: 1144430
- Headquarters: London
- Region served: England; Northern Ireland; Scotland; Wales
- Official language: English
- Website: transmediawatch.org

Trans Media Watch (TMW) is a British charity founded in 2009 to improve media coverage of transgender and intersex issues. By improving media coverage, TMW strives to "foster social acceptance and civil recognition for trans persons", and to prevent the "material consequences" of misrepresentation.

TMW also publishes recommendations for trans people interacting with the media.

== Founding ==
One impetus of the charity's creation was a 2009 episode of the comedy series Moving Wallpaper which featured transphobic jokes.

One of the co-founders of TMW is Josephine Shaw, a longtime activist for trans rights.

== Research ==
In April 2010, TMW published 'How Transgender People Experience the Media', which describes the findings of a study conducted between November 2009 and February 2010 to learn how transgender people in the UK feel about the media portrays them. The research concluded that humiliating and demeaning characterisations of trans people in the media play a significant role in encouraging societal prejudice and abuse towards the community.

== Memorandum of understanding ==
In March 2011, UK broadcaster Channel 4 became the inaugural signatory of TMW's memorandum of understanding (MoU), a document which calls for better media representation of trans people. In May 2011, Women in Journalism became a signatory, acknowledging the killing of eminent human rights lawyer and trans woman Sonia Burgess, and its subsequent prejudicial media coverage, as stimulus to do so. The Observer newspaper also took notice of TMW due to Burgess' death, saying there is a "need for sensitivity and respect" when dealing with transgender stories.

Paris Lees, a British transgender journalist, worked with Trans Media Watch to persuade the broadcaster to commit to removing all transphobic material from their content. She was working for Channel 4 at the time and was instrumental in getting the broadcaster to be a signatory.

At the MoU launch, held at Channel 4's London headquarters, Lynne Featherstone, the junior Minister for Equality, said "Congratulations to Trans Media Watch for this brilliant initiative and to Channel 4 for being the first (hopefully of many) broadcasters to sign up."

The signing was criticised by Channel 4's disability editorial manager, Alison Walsh. Her concern was that the memorandum, which calls for positive, well-informed representation of transgender people in the media, was a form of media censorship. The chair of Trans Media Watch, Jennie Kermode responded by affirming that the purpose of the memorandum is to provide a balanced and accurate coverage, and was not to discourage honest or challenging portrayals of transgender people.

== Leveson inquiry ==
In December 2011, Trans Media Watch made a submission to the Leveson Inquiry into the "culture, practice and ethics of the press," in which it described the "unethical and often horrific and humiliating treatment of transgender and intersex people by the British press." In February 2012, a TMW representative gave evidence in person.

== Other activities ==
In 2012, Trans Media Watch hosted a journalism and broadcasting conference at the University of London Union. The event, called Trans Media Watch European Conference 2012, took place on 7 October 2012, and was open to non-professionals so that transgender and intersex people could learn about the British and European media.

In May 2015, Trans Media Watch filed a complaint with the Independent Press Standards Organisation (IPSO), for discriminatory remarks and violations of privacy published by The Sun in 2014. The complaint was a response to disparaging remarks made by journalist Rod Liddle at the expense of Emily Brothers, a transgender politician who was standing for election as a member of parliament for the Sutton and Cheam constituency. After a process of adjudication, the IPSO upheld the complaint, and ruled that Mr Liddle and The Sun were in breach of the Editors' Code of Practice. The TMW did not represent Ms Brothers in their complaint, but raised the issue as a "representative group" affected by Mr Liddle's implications.

== Trans Media Action ==
In September 2011, Trans Media Watch and On Road Media launched the Trans Media Action initiative, with support from the BBC and Channel 4. Trans Media Action comprised a series of workshops and other initiatives designed to facilitate understanding between transgender people and journalists. Trans Media Action is now known as All About Trans.

== See also ==
- All About Trans, a British organisation that promotes a transgender presence and accurate representation in the media
- Death of Lucy Meadows
- Paris Lees, journalist and campaigner
- Transgender rights in the United Kingdom
