= Trans Pride Brighton =

Annual transgender pride event in England

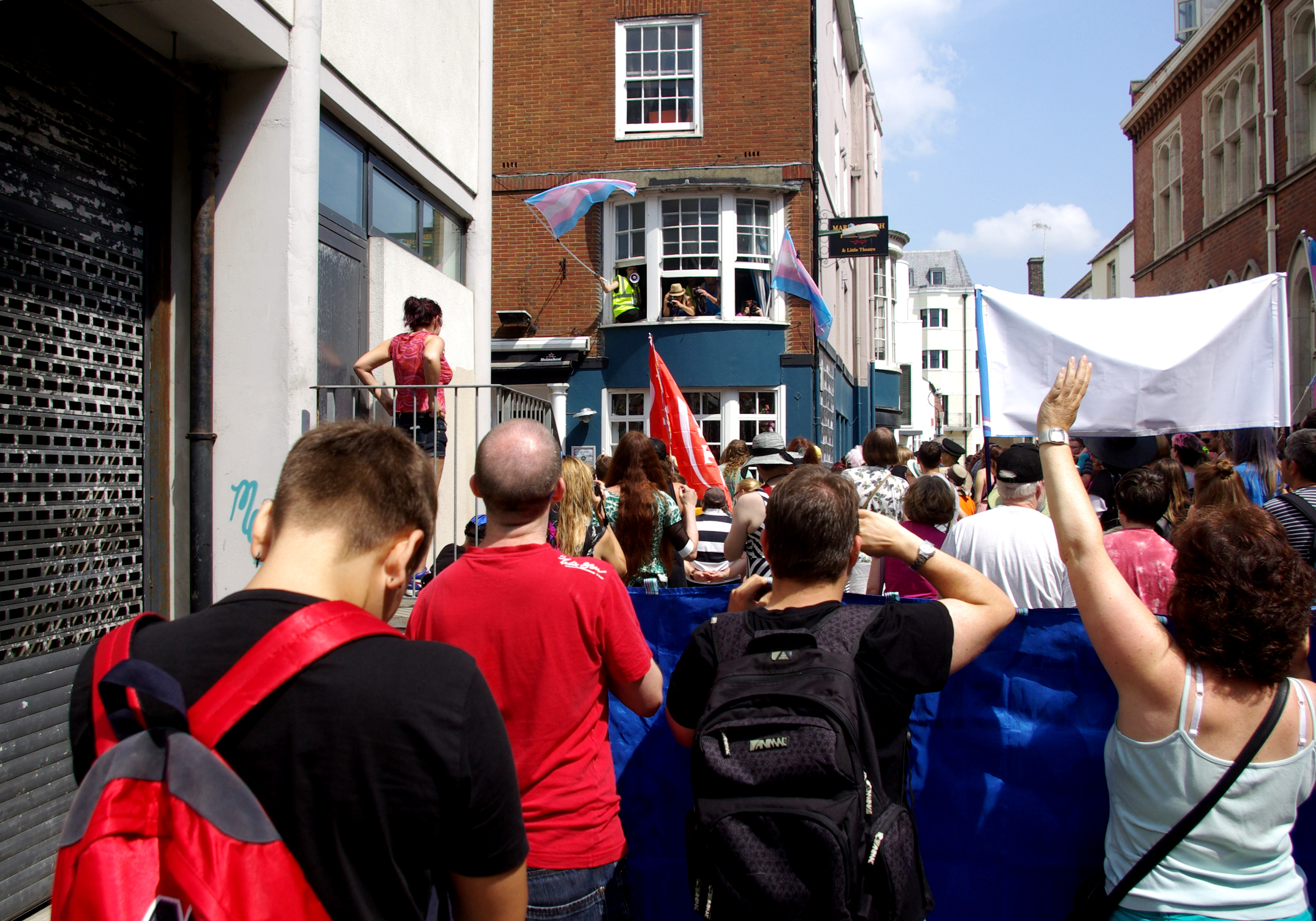
- The march in 2014
- Frequency: Annually
- Inaugurated: 2013
- Founders: Sarah Savage, Fox Fisher, Phoenix Thomas, Stephanie Scott, Sabah Choudrey
- Previous event: 18 July 2025 – 20 July 2025
- Next event: tbc
- Attendance: 40,000+

Trans Pride Brighton and Hove is a pride protest and community festival advocating transgender rights. It is held in Brighton and Hove, England. The event began in 2013 and takes place annually.

== History ==
Trans Pride Brighton and Hove was founded in 2013, the first trans-specific pride event to be held in the UK. The co-founders were Sarah Savage, Fox Fisher, Phoenix Thomas, Stephanie Scott and Sabah Choudrey.

In an article written by Natasha Thoday entitled "Putting the ‘T’ in LGB at Brighton Pride 2002", published in 2016 in Brighton's Scene Magazine (formerly GScene), Thoday writes that: "in 2001 Pride in Brighton & Hove was still only explicitly celebrating the diversity of the LGB communities. We wanted to change that by specifically and visibly having Pride and all the other agencies across the city put the T with LGB." Thoday also created a web site called GenderDiversity.org with the original proposal, an information sheet, and photos of trans people celebrating the first LGBT Brighton Pride in 2002.

The 2016 event saw attendance of several hundred people.

The 2017 event saw attendance of 2,500 people.

The 2018 event saw attendance of 5,000 people.

The 2019 event saw an attendance of 8,000 people, 2000 more than was anticipated by the organisers. The march that year used the slogan "putting the T first," in reference to the acronym LGBT, where the T is usually placed as the last letter.

In 2020 and 2021, in-person events were cancelled due to the COVID-19 pandemic in England, with events being held virtually instead. The 2020 digital events saw a total audience of 10,000 viewers.

In 2022, in-person events returned and saw an attendance of over 20,000 people. The community festival held in Brunswick Square Gardens was headlined by performance artist Travis Alabanza.

The organisation team behind Trans Pride Brighton opened The Trans Pride Centre in 2022, a community space specifically for trans and nonbinary people.

In 2023, they were awarded the Grassroots Pride of The Year award by Gaydio. The 2023 event celebrated 10 years of Trans Pride and had 30,000 attendees despite a yellow Weather warning causing the parade route to be changed. The windy weather made it unsafe to host the event in Brunswick Square Gardens. Instead the Saturday park events were held in the Brighton Dome, The Queery, The Ledward Centre, and The Actors, with the venues offering the spaces at no cost. A beach party was planned for the Sunday, but had to be cancelled due to a fire breaking out in the Royal Albion Hotel the night before.

The 2025 event was headlined by Kate Nash.

== See also ==
- LGBT community of Brighton and Hove
- London Trans+ Pride
- Transgender rights in the United Kingdom
- 21st-century anti-trans movement in the United Kingdom
