= Sabah Choudrey =

British Muslim activist and writer

Sabah Choudrey is an English activist, speaker and writer who has spoken about their experiences as a queer and trans individual within the Muslim community. They co-founded Trans Pride Brighton and the Colours Youth Network and is a director at Middlesex Pride.

== Biography ==
Choudrey grew up in a Pakistani Muslim family in Hounslow, West London. Choudrey graduated from the University of Sussex with a Bachelor of Science (BSc) in Psychology.

In 2013, Choudrey co-founded Trans Pride Brighton, the first trans-specific pride parade in England.

In 2015, Choudrey spoke at TEDxBrixton, giving a talk titled "Brown, trans, queer, Muslim and proud." They are Vice-Chair for the Board of Trustees at the Inclusive Mosque Initiative, which creates inclusive places for marginalised Muslims. They have spoken to the media about being a queer Muslin in Ramadan.

In 2016, Choudrey helped found Colours Youth Network, a youth group supporting LGBTQ+ young people of colour and youth workers. The group announced they would be closing in 2024 after 8 years of working with LGBTQ+ individuals of colour across the UK.

In 2021, they were awarded Gay Times's Honour for Future Fighter. They were later named on the Diversity Power List 2024/25.

In 2022, Choudrey wrote the book Supporting Trans People of Colour: How to Make Your Practice Inclusive, published by Jessica Kingsley Publishers, which "uses case studies, independent research and practical checklists to introduce professionals working with trans people to ways of creating safer spaces". They were also commissioned by the Gender Identity Research & Education Society (GIRES) to write the 28 page booklet Inclusivity – Supporting BAME Trans People in 2016.

In 2023, Choudrey helped volunteer for the first in-person Middlesex Pride event. They later joined the Middlesex Pride team as a director. They also started QTIPOC, a support network for queer, trans and intersex people of colour in Brighton and Hove, as well as founding desiQ for queer desi people.

In 2026, Choudrey was included in the Attitude 101 list of LGBTQ+ changemakers.

In addition to their activism, Choudrey is a psychotherapist and artist wellbeing practitioner. They have spoken about their own career journey in psychotherapy and how therapy created space for them to accept themself.
