= Mike Beddow =

English cricketer (born 1941)

Alan Michael Beddow (born 12 October 1941, St Helens) is a former English cricketer who was active from 1962 to 1966. He made his first-class debut in 1962 and appeared in 33 matches as a right-handed batsman who bowled right arm medium pace, playing for Lancashire. He scored 775 runs with a highest score of 112* and took fifteen wickets with a best performance of three for 10.
