= LGBTQ people in the United Kingdom =

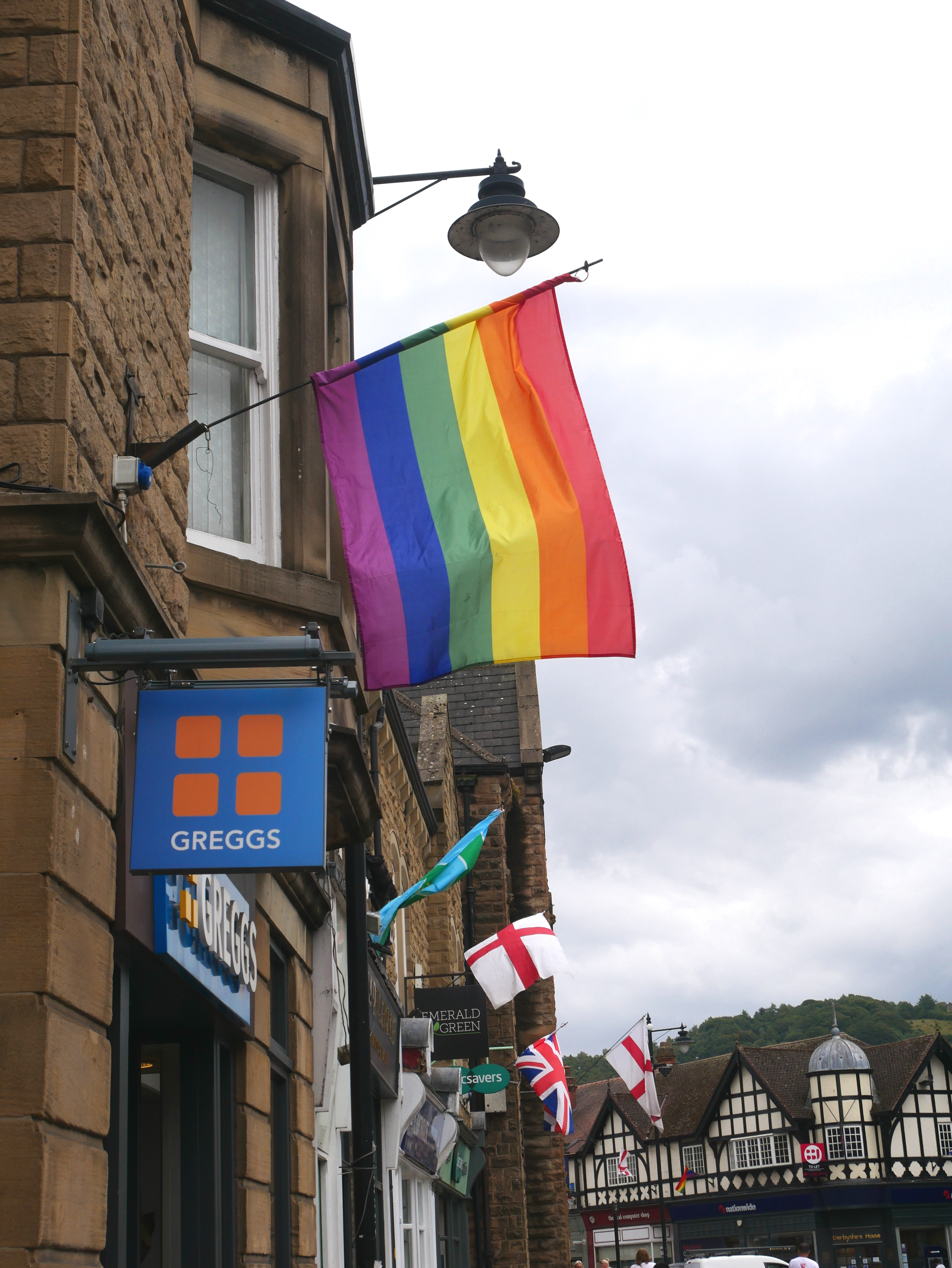
A Pride flag in Matlock, Derbyshire, in 2025

Lesbian, gay and bisexual rights in the United Kingdom are considered to be advanced by international standards. Same-sex marriage has been legal in England, Wales and Scotland since 2014, and in Northern Ireland since 2020. Same-sex couples have full adoption rights across the UK, and anti-discrimination protections — covering employment, housing, education and public services — have been enshrined in law through the Equality Act 2010.

Pink Union Jack pride flag

Public opinion in the UK is mostly supportive of homosexuality; however, support for transgender and non-binary issues is mixed and has been declining since 2019-20 with the significant and consistent drops noticeable from 2022 onwards. Trans people have been able to change their gender since 2005.

== Rights ==
UK law currently does not recognise non-binary gender on legal documents.

== Demographics ==
According to the Office for National Statistics (ONS), the percentage of the UK population identifying as lesbian, gay or bisexual (LGB) increased from 1.5% in 2012 to 2.0% in 2017. There are 1.1 million people identifying as LGB in UK. The 16-to-24 age group were the most likely to identify as LGB in 2017 (4.2%).

A 2010 Integrated Household Survey estimated 1.5% of people in the UK identify themselves as gay, lesbian or bisexual – far lower than previous estimates of 5–7%. Interpreting the statistics, an ONS spokesperson said, "Someone may engage in sexual behaviour with someone of the same sex but still not perceive themselves as gay." According to YouGov, however, studies such as that of the Integrated Household Survey underestimate the true proportion of the population that is LGBT as they use a face-to-face methodology, and non-heterosexual people are less willing to disclose their sexual orientation to an interviewer. YouGov itself estimates, based on its panel, which was inquired via an online questionnaire, that the proportion of LGBT people in the UK is 7%. Estimates of the size of the trans population in the UK is between 65,000 and 300,000. The size of the transgender population or people experiencing gender dysphoria was estimated at between 2,400 and 10,500. The LGBT rights charity Stonewall concludes that it is hard to define the LGBT population of the UK because some LGBT people are not out.

== Representation ==
=== Census ===
In 2009 the Equality and Human Rights Commission called for the inclusion of a question on sexual orientation in the 2011 census, but this was rejected by the Office for National Statistics who run the census.

In the 2021 census questions on gender, gender identity and sexual orientation were included for the first time. Stonewall supported the move, stating "gathering data on LGBT communities in the UK is a vital step towards building a society where LGBT people are truly accepted, everywhere and by everyone." These provisions were made in the Census (Return Particulars and Removal of Penalties) Act 2019 for England and Wales, and in the Census (Amendment) (Scotland) Act 2019 for Scotland. The guidance to the question "What is your sex?" was subject to a High Court case, led by Fair Play For Women, which found that sex should only be declared per the sex recorded on either a birth certificate or Gender Recognition Certificate, rather than any other official document.

=== Media ===
As a national broadcaster, the BBC has been associated with LGBT people through its history. In 1938 the BBC broadcast the "female impersonator" Douglas Byng, who was closeted at the time of broadcast. In 1957, following the release of the Wolfenden report, BBC Radio broadcast a special programme titled "The Homosexual Condition" and the subject was discussed on Lifeline and Any Questions? television programmes. In 1965 the BBC postponed the broadcast of The Wednesday Play: Horror of Darkness due to the inclusion of a gay love triangle.

Following the Sexual Offences Act 1967, which legalised consensual sex between men over the age of 21, BBC television representation increased. In 1970 the first ever gay kiss was shown on television, between Ian McKellen and James Laurenson in a performance of Edward II. The first lesbian kiss was shown later in 1974, between Alison Steadman and Myra Frances on the programme Girl, part of Second City Firsts. In 1987 EastEnders showed the first same-sex kiss on a British soap opera. In 1995 the programme Gaytime TV was broadcast on BBC Two, the first to be primarily targeted at queer audiences.

Music continued to be censored by the BBC throughout the 1970s and 80s. In 1978 Tom Robinson's Glad to be Gay was banned by BBC Radio 1. In 1984 Frankie Goes to Hollywood's Relax was similarly banned from daytime and chart shows.

Mark Drakeford, then the first minister of Wales, marks the beginning of LGBT+ History Month 2021.

In 2005 the first LGBT History Month took place, with broadcast on the BBC generally sceptical. The BBC has continued to cover LGBT History Month.

In 2010 the BBC Trust produced a report calling for increased representation of LGBT minorities, including more "incidental homosexuality" in TV programming.

In March 2019 the first LGBT+ correspondent for BBC News, Ben Hunte, was hired. In November 2020 it was announced that staff working in news and current affairs at the BBC were banned from attending UK pride marches, so as not to be seen as politically biased (even in a "personal" individual capacity). The BBC later clarified that whilst it was not a blanket ban, staff should seek permission before attending events.

In July 2020 the first same-sex kiss on the children's TV channel CBBC was aired, following a long-running romantic arc between two female characters on the Canadian teen drama series The Next Step.

=== Literature ===
Although same-sex sexual activity was illegal in parts of the United Kingdom up to 1982, gay, lesbian and transgender themes appear in British literature throughout the 20th century.

=== Politics ===
LGBT people have been serving openly in UK politics since the 1970s. In 1972 Sam Green, an openly gay man and member of the Gay Liberation Front, was elected as a member of Durham City Council for the Liberal Party. He has since been described as the first openly gay political candidate in the UK.

The first openly LGBT member of Parliament (MP) was Maureen Colquhoun (Labour Party, MP 1974–79), who was outed as a lesbian in 1976. Colquhoun was a left-wing feminist and sought to combat gender inequality. Colquhoun was deselected due to her sexuality and her feminist views in 1977, but this decision was later overturned.

Chris Smith, an MP since 1983 and out since 1984, became the first openly gay secretary of state for culture, media and sport in 1997. Later that year, Angela Eagle came out and became the first openly lesbian MP since Colquhoun.

46 openly LGB MPs were elected at the 2019 general election. This was one fewer than in 2017, an increase of five from the 2015 general election. Of those 46 LGB MPs, 20 were Conservatives, 15 were Labour, 10 were Scottish National Party (SNP) and one was an independent. Of the main parties, the SNP had the highest proportion of LGB MPs (21%). No openly trans or non-binary MPs were elected at the 2019 general election.

Nikki Sinclaire (UKIP, 2009–2014) was the first ever trans British parliamentarian as a member of the European Parliament for West Midlands from 2009 to 2014.

Layla Moran, a Liberal Democrat, became the first ever openly pansexual MP in 2017.

In 2021 Owen Hurcum, 23, became the world's first openly non-binary mayor after they were chosen by fellow councillors on Bangor City Council in Gwynedd, Wales. Owen identifies as queer and agender.

On 30 March 2022 Katie Wallis, a Conservative then known as Jamie Wallis, came out as transgender, becoming the first openly transgender British MP.

=== Currency ===
In March 2021 the Bank of England announced that the next £50 note would have Alan Turing displayed on the reverse; it entered circulation on 23 June 2021, reflecting Turing's birth date.

The Royal Mint released a 50 pence coin to celebrate the 50th anniversary of Pride. It was designed by Dominique Holmes, an LGBTQ+ activist. One side features Queen Elizabeth II, and the other side showcases a rainbow design symbolising Pride. The rainbow includes "pride" in the centre and represents Pride in London's values: protest, visibility, unity and equality.

== Public opinion ==
=== Towards homosexuality ===
Historical attitudes to same-sex sexual relations in Britain (1983–2012)

In 1993 Stonewall conducted a survey of gay men and lesbians at work where they found two-thirds of respondents hid their sexuality at work and only 11% of respondents never hid their sexual orientation in the workplace. A follow-up survey in 2008 found that 20% of gay and lesbian people had experienced bullying at work.

Attitudes towards homosexuality amongst the British public have become more tolerant over time; according to the British Social Attitudes Survey, in 1983 approximately 50% to 70% of respondents of the three major political parties (Conservative, Labour and Liberal Democrat) regarded homosexuality as "always wrong" or "mostly wrong" and in 1993 opposition to homosexuality was reported to have slightly increased amongst all parties. However, by 2003 attitudes had become more tolerant, with 25% to 50% of respondents regarding homosexuality as always or mostly wrong and by 2013, only around 20% to 35% of respondents in each party felt the same way. Liberal Democrat respondents tended to be less likely to regard homosexuality as wrong than Labour or Conservative respondents across each survey. In 2015 a poll carried out by YouGov found that nearly twice as many residents in London believed homosexuality to be "morally wrong" compared to the rest of the UK (29% compared to 15 to 17%). Londoners were also over five times more likely to reject support for a gay child compared to the rest of the UK. A face-to-face survey conducted in 2015 by ICM Research for Channel 4 found that 18% of British Muslims agreed with the statement that homosexuality should be legal in Britain, while 52% disagreed and 22% neither agreed or disagreed. This differed from a Gallup poll conducted in 2009 which found that British Muslims had zero tolerance towards homosexuality.

An illustration of social attitudes towards homosexuality in the UK was provided in May 2007 in a survey by YouGov. The poll indicated that legislation outlawing discrimination on the grounds of sexual orientation was supported by 90% of British citizens. It also showed positive public perceptions of gay people in particular, but recognised the extent to which prejudice still exists. A poll in June 2009 conducted by Populus for The Times reported that the majority of the public supported same-sex marriage; 61% of respondents agreed that "Gay couples should have an equal right to get married, not just to have civil partnerships". There were few differentials by partisanship.

A more recent opinion poll, conducted in 2017 by the American Pew Research Center, found that 77% of the British public were in favour of same-sex marriage. Support had increased to 85% according to the 2019 Eurobarometer, which polled all members states of the European Union on the question. The EU average was 69%.

=== Towards transgender people ===
A June 2020 survey by YouGov found that British people tended to support people identifying as the gender of their choice, but did not support making the legal process easier. YouGov's analysis also remarked that British "[p]eople tend to be fine with transgender people using facilities for their new gender, but not if they have not undergone gender reassignment surgery". The survey found women and younger respondents to be more trans-friendly than men and older respondents.

2018–2022 YouGov Survey
	Dec 2018 (%)			June 2020 (%)			May 2022 (%)		
	Agree	Disagree	Not sure	Agree	Disagree	Not sure	Agree	Disagree	Not sure
"A transgender man is a man"	43	32	25	▼41	▲36	23	▼39	▲39	22
"A transgender woman is a woman"	43	32	25	▼40	▲36	23	▼38	▲40	22
"It should be made easier for transgender people to change their legal gender"	28	48	24	28	▼47	25	▼26	▲50	25
"Transgender women should be allowed to participate in women's sport"	27	48	25	▼20	▲55	25	▼16	▲61	22
"Transgender men should be allowed to participate in men's sport"	37	39	25	▼31	▲44	24	▼29	▲48	23
"Transgender women should be able to use the women's toilet"	46	30	23	46	30	23	▼38	▲41	21
"Transgender men should be allowed to use the men's toilet"	48	27	25	▲49	▲28	23	▼42	▲34	23

Over 60% of trans people report experiencing transphobia in the workplace, more than 40% face challenges accessing safe housing, and approximately 85% have encountered transphobic harassment in public spaces.

=== LGBT experience ===
In 2017, 108,000 people participated in the National LGBT Survey, making it one of the biggest surveys of LGBT people in the world. LGBT people were found to be less satisfied with life compared to the wider UK population, with trans satisfaction notably lower. 68% of respondents said they avoided holding hands with their same-sex partner in public. 5% of respondents had been offered conversion therapy, with 2% undergoing such therapies. The findings from the National LGBT Survey have been used to inform a 75-point LGBT Action Plan to address the key issues identified, including bringing forward proposals to ban conversion therapy.

Access to gender identity clinics remains limited, with long waiting times and reported difficulties for around 14% of those seeking care. Mental health disparities are also prominent, with around 47% of trans and non-binary people reporting long-term mental health conditions, significantly higher than among the general population.
