= Rainbow List =

List of the most influential LGBT individuals in the UK

The Rainbow List (called the Pink List until 2014) is a list of the most influential openly LGBTQ individuals in the United Kingdom, published annually in the British national newspaper The Independent on Sunday. The list was started in 2000 to recognise individuals in public life who are openly gay, but has since grown to "[honour] those who have long and brave histories of standing up for equal rights".

== History ==
=== Pink List ===
The list was first published in 2000 to recognise openly gay individuals in the public sphere, and initially listed 50 people. Janet Street-Porter, then editor of the paper, wrote in 2012 that she started the list at the time "to celebrate the huge contribution [that gay people] make to every aspect of modern life".

=== Rainbow List ===
The list was renamed for the 2014 edition to be "more inclusive, less old-fashioned and far less like the 'girls' aisle in a toyshop". The first edition as the Rainbow List was topped by Labour Peer and former actor Michael, Baron Cashman.

== Criticism ==
Stephen Fry criticised the list in 2010 for its portrayal of Louie Spence as a "gay stereotype", whose 15 minutes of fame was already running out. Fry later stated that he had been told that the section in which Spence appeared, the "Rogue's Gallery", had been written separately by a journalist "without the deliberators' knowledge or consent."

The list has also been criticised as being unsystematic in its compilation. The Huffington Post columnist "The Guyliner" complained of the 2012 list that "[n]o complicated formulae accompany any piece about the list to tell you how this influence is calculated", and that "it is nothing more than an inventory of names".
