= The House on the Dune =

The House on the Dune (French: La maison dans la dune) may refer to:

- The House on the Dune (novel), a 1932 novel by the writer Maxence Van Der Meersch
- The House on the Dune (1934 film), a French film adaptation directed by Pierre Billon
- The House on the Dune (1952 film), a French film adaptation directed by Georges Lampin
- The House on the Dune (1988 film), a Belgian film adaptation directed by Michel Mees
