= Paul Carton =

French physician and naturopath (1875–1947)

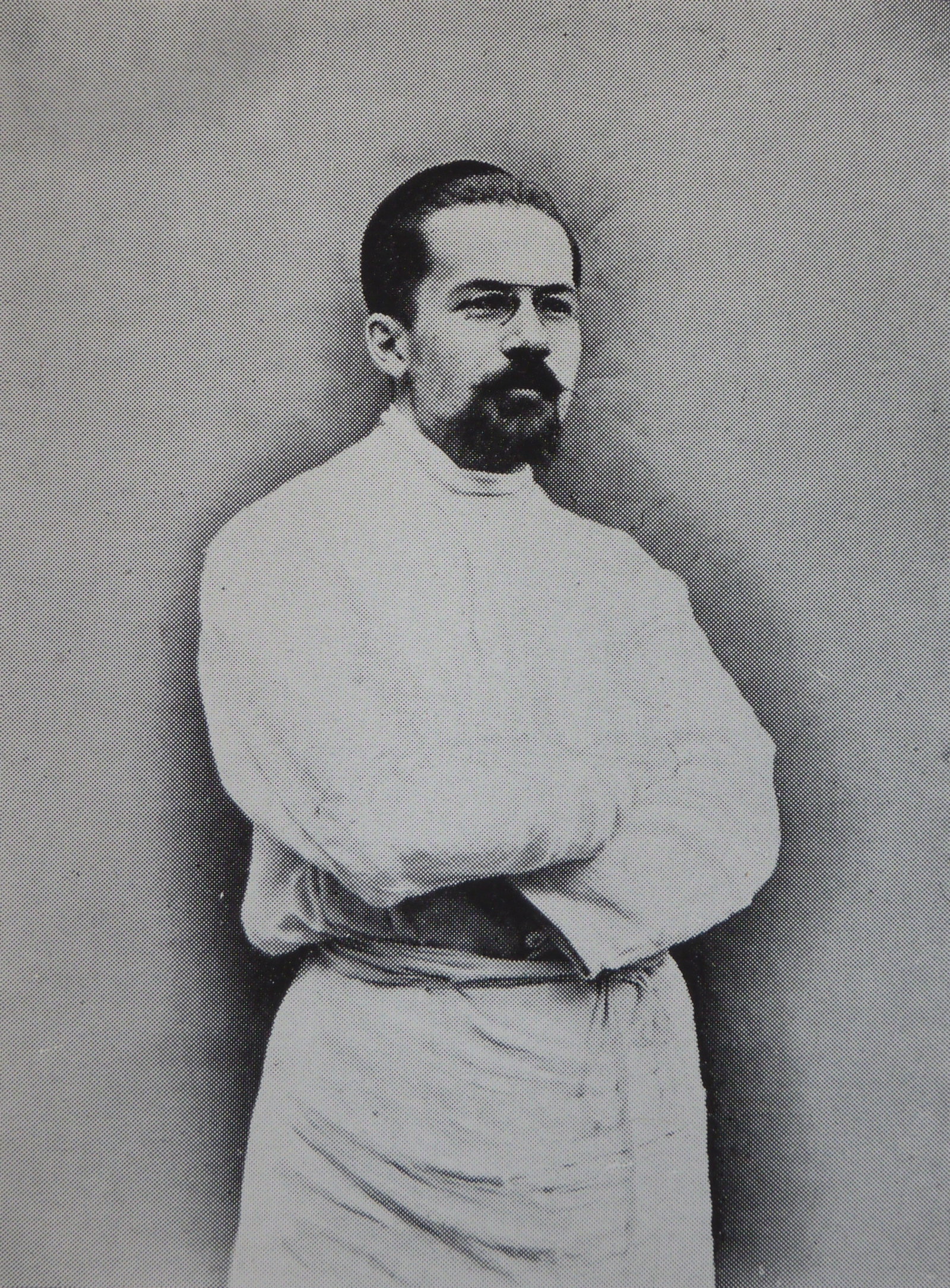
- Born: 12 March 1875; Meaux
- Died: 20 October 1947 (aged 72); Limeil-Brévannes
- Occupations: Physician, naturopath

Paul Joseph Edmond Carton (12 March 1875 – 20 October 1947) was a French physician, naturopath and practitioner of vegetarianism.

== Biography ==
Carton was born in Meaux. He received his medical education at the Ecole de Medecine de Paris. In 1903, Carton suffered from tuberculosis. He became disillusioned with the medical establishment and took interest in naturopathy and vegetarianism which he claimed helped recover his health. Carton was a vegetarian and promoted "naturist vegetarianism". He was a member of the French Vegetarian Society.

Naturist vegetarianism was a dieting and health system that involved abstinence from alcohol, drugs, meat, processed foods, spices and tea. It embraced natural hygienic principles, gymnastics, hydrotherapy and prayer. Carton was influenced by Hippocrates and his conception of naturism was entirely opposed to nudism which he equated with moral degradation. He advocated asceticism in relation to clothing, drinking, eating and sex.

Carton was opposed to the overfeeding of patients. He believed that strict control of eating would allow patients to be cured. He campaigned against the consumption of butter, meat and white bread. He operated a sanatorium at Brevannes, near Paris. The sanatorium had a laboratory for testing his dietary and hydropathic ideas.

In 1921, he created the Societe Naturiste Francaise' (French Naturist Society) and in 1922 the journal La Revue Naturiste (The Naturist Review). He authored an influential vegetarian cookbook in 1925 which went through many editions. His recipes focused on fresh fruit and vegetables, grains and large quantities of cream and eggs.

Carton's Consumption Doomed and Some Popular Foodstuffs Exposed were translated by Dorothy Richardson.

Students of Carton include André Schlemmer (1890–1973) and Jacques Chauveau.

== Philosophy ==
Carton was a Catholic and held anti-materialist views. His ideas about naturist medicine were influenced by Catholicism and vitalist philosophy. His dietary principles became known as Cartonianism. There was a religious element to his dietary principles. His belief in original sin, hell, and the Christian sacrifice was central to his medical worldview. He held the idea that health should be earned and that pain had a purifying role. Disease was the result of violation of physical and mental laws.

Carton was also interested in occultism. He believed that humans are a microcosm reflecting the macrocosm of the universe. He argued that humans are constantly evolving as the universe does and that evolution has endowed people with vast states of conscience. His philosophy combined occultism and vegetarianism into a system of mental and physical health.

== Reception ==
Carton's health views were seen as extreme and were ignored by the medical community of his day. However, he was seen as an original thinker for mixing nutrition and vegetarianism with Christianity, occultism and Neo-Hippocratism. Historian Stephen Harp has described Carton, Jacques Demarquette, and the Durville brothers as leading advocates of naturopathy during early 20th-century France.

The best-selling novel Bodies and Souls (Corps et âmes), by the French writer Maxence Van der Meersch and published in 1943, was inspired by the character and medical doctrine of Carton.

== Selected publications ==
- La Tuberculose par arthritisme. Étude Clinique. Traitement rationnel et pratique (1911)
- Les Trois Aliments meurtriers: la viande, le sucre, l'alcool (1912), translated The Three Lethal Foods: Meat, Sugar and Alcohol
- Consumption Doomed (translated by Dorothy Richardson, 1913)
- Some Popular Foodstuffs Exposed (translated by Dorothy Richardson, 1913)
- La Cure de soleil et d'exercices (1917)
- Traité de médecine, d'alimentation et d'hygiène naturistes (1920)
- Le Dialogue de la santé (1922)
- Le Naturisme dans Sénèque (1922)
- Bienheureux Ceux qui souffrent (1923)
- L'Essentiel de la doctrine d'Hippocrate (1923)
- La Cuisine simple (1925), (translated by Elizabeth Lucas as Simple Vegetarian Cookery, 1931)
- Le Faux Naturisme de Jean-Jacques Rousseau (1931)
