= The Doctor and the Girl =

1949 drama film directed by Curtis Bernhardt

- Directed by: Curtis Bernhardt
- Screenplay by: Theodore Reeves
- Based on: Bodies and Souls by Maxence Van der Meersch
- Produced by: Pandro S. Berman
- Starring: Glenn Ford; Charles Coburn; Gloria DeHaven; Janet Leigh; Bruce Bennett
- Cinematography: Robert Planck
- Edited by: Ferris Webster
- Music by: Rudolph G. Kopp (musical direction)
- Production company: A Metro–Goldwyn–Mayer Silver Anniversary Picture
- Distributed by: Metro-Goldwyn-Mayer
- Release date: September 29, 1949 (U.S.)
- Running time: 98 minutes
- Country: United States
- Language: English
- Budget: $1,055,000
- Box office: $1,888,000

The Doctor and the Girl (also known as Bodies and Souls) is a 1949 American drama film directed by Curtis Bernhardt and starring Glenn Ford, Charles Coburn, Gloria DeHaven and Janet Leigh that was inspired by the French novel Bodies and Souls by Maxence Van der Meersch. It marked the debut of Nancy Reagan (then known as Nancy Davis).

== Plot ==
Michael Corday has recently received his medical degree, and starts an internship at Bellevue Hospital, in New York City. His father is also a doctor, and is pleased that Michael intends to specialize in neurosurgery.

Michael's sister, Mariette, is engaged to another doctor, George Esmond, but Michael believes George is only interested in the family's prestige. Fabienne, Michael's youngest sister, lives alone in Greenwich Village.

At the hospital, Michael works in the emergency room under Dr. Granville, who is not impressed by Michael's gruff and compassionless treatment of his patients.

Michael admits Evelyn, a patient with a lung abscess. She works the taffy machine at a candy store, so he calls her Taffy. She must build strength before she can withstand her surgery; during her lengthy time in hospital, Michael falls in love with her.

Michael's father has Taffy discharged behind Michael's back. When Michael confronts him, he gives Michael her address, but says he will be cut off from the family if he marries her. Michael finds Taffy, and they get married; his sisters have a growing fondness for Taffy, but his father remains disappointed.

Michael starts a street front medical practice, with Taffy helping to set up the office and help out. His patients like him, and Michael treats his patients with compassion.

Fabienne, who has become pregnant to a married man who has deserted her, turns up at Michael's door, suffering major blood loss after a miscarriage. Michael takes her to Bellevue, but she dies during surgery. In their grief, Michael and his father finally bond; Michael and Taffy continue running his private practice.

== Cast ==
- Glenn Ford as Dr. Michael Corday
- Charles Coburn as Dr. John Corday
- Gloria DeHaven as Fabienne
- Janet Leigh as Evelyn Heldon, "Taffy"
- Bruce Bennett as Dr. Alfred Norton
- Warner Anderson as Dr. George Esmond
- Basil Ruysdael as Dr. Francis I. Garard
- Nancy Davis as Mariette
- Arthur Franz as Dr. Harvey L. Kenmore
- Lisa Golm as Hetty
- Joanne De Bergh as Child's Mother

== Production ==
Prior to The Doctor and the Girl, American films avoided discussion of abortion, which was illegal in most states. MGM convinced the Motion Picture Association of America, which enforced the Hays Code, that the topic of abortion, which was not explicitly forbidden by the Code, could be tastefully addressed in the film. While the film vaguely referred to the procedure as "an illegal operation," the precedent allowed later films to include abortion plotlines.

== Reception ==
According to MGM records, the film earned US$1,326,000 in the United States and Canada and US$562,000 elsewhere, resulting in a profit of US$184,000 (equivalent to $2,489,790 in 2025).
