= Michel Spanneut =

French priest (1919–2004)

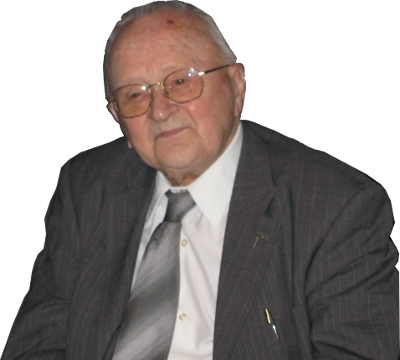
Michel Spanneut

Michel Spanneut (6 November 1919 in Steenvoorde – 28 April 2004 in Lomme) was a French priest and patristics scholar. From a Flemish speaking agricultural family in the Nord Département, after primary school he entered the Petit séminaire at Hazebrook. Following studies at the Université Catholique de Lille, where he obtained a doctorate in theology, and ordination to the priesthood in 1944, he completed a doctorat d' état under the direction of Henri-Irénée Marrou devoted to the influence of Stoic philosophy on Church Fathers from Clement of Rome to Clement of Alexandria (i.e. prior to or competing with various stages of Platonism). The permanence of Stoicism in Western thought remained one of his major preoccupations. Some of his early publications dealt with Eustathius of Antioch. A teacher at the Université Catholique de Lille from 1955 to 1989 he became Dean of the Faculty of Letters. He was an honorary canon of Lille.

In 2007 he donated his correspondence (1933–1951) with Maxence Van der Meersch to the Roubaix Médiathèque.

== Publications ==
Le stoïcisme des pères de l'Eglise de Clément de Rome à Clément d'Alexandrie (coll. Patristica Sorbonensia, 1), Paris 1957. Nouvelle édition revue et augmentée, Paris 1969.

Epiktet, in Reallexikon für Antike und Christentum, 1962.

Permanence du stoïcisme de Zénon à Malraux, Gembloux 1973.

Commentaire sur la paraphrase chrétienne du Manuel d' Epictète, introduction, texte (partiellement) inédit, apparat critique, traduction, notes et index, Sources Chrétiennes no. 5003, Cerf, Paris 2007.
