= Trans Legal Clinic =

The Trans Legal Clinic is a specialist legal clinic in the United Kingdom founded in 2022. It is the UK's first known trans-led legal clinic focusing on gender identity legal matters. The clinic was founded by Olivia Campbell-Cavendish whilst she was a law student at King's College London. As of 2026, the clinic is based at Thanet House on the Strand in Central London.

The clinic has been registered as a charity with the Charities Commission since 2024 as Trans Legal Foundation. It is controlled by five trustees. The clinic launched its Strategic Litigation Service in 2025 with its application to the European Court of Human Rights (ECtHR) challenging the UK Supreme Court's ruling in For Women Scotland Ltd v the Scottish Ministers. This campaign is on behalf of Victoria McCloud, the first trans judge in the UK.
