= The House on the Dune (1952 film) =

1952 film

- Directed by: Georges Lampin
- Written by: Jean-Paul Le Chanois; Jacques Rémy)
- Based on: The House on the Dune by Maxence Van der Meersch
- Produced by: Robert Dorfmann; Adolphe Osso
- Starring: Ginette Leclerc; Jean Chevrier; Roger Pigaut
- Cinematography: Jean Bourgoin
- Edited by: Borys Lewin
- Music by: Maurice Thiriet
- Production companies: Films Vendôme; Silver Films
- Distributed by: Les Films Corona
- Release date: 29 February 1952
- Running time: 90 minutes
- Country: France
- Language: French

The House on the Dune (French: La maison dans la dune) is a 1952 French crime drama film directed by Georges Lampin and starring Ginette Leclerc, Jean Chevrier and Roger Pigaut. It was a remake of the 1934 film of the same title, which was in turn based on the 1932 novel The House on the Dune by Maxence Van Der Meersch. The film's sets were designed by the art director Maurice Colasson.

== Synopsis ==
Close to the Belgian border, smuggler Sylvain and his lover Germaine give shelter to Sylvain's friend and fellow smuggler César who has killed a customs officer. The dogged Inspector Lourges is placed on the case, although he begins to develop feelings for Germaine.

== Cast ==
- Ginette Leclerc as Germaine
- Jean Chevrier as L'inspecteur des douanes Lourges
- Roger Pigaut as Sylvain
- Marie-Claire Olivia as Pascaline
- Arthur Devère as César
- Edmond Ardisson
- Guy Decomble
- Raymond Raynal
- Paul Faivre as L'oncle de Pascaline
- Robert Rollis as Le matelot
- René Hell
- André Wasley
- Jean Sylvère
- Sylvain
- Nicole Regnault
- René Pascal
- Georges Patrix
- Monette Dinay
- Maurice Dorléac
- Françoise Fechter
- Guillaume Lambrette
- Émile Mylo
- Maryse Paillet

== Bibliography ==
- Philippe Rège. Encyclopedia of French Film Directors, Volume 1. Scarecrow Press, 2009.
