= The House on the Dune (1934 film) =

1934 film

- Directed by: Pierre Billon
- Written by: Charles Spaak; Maxence Van der Meersch (novel)
- Starring: Pierre Richard-Willm; Madeleine Ozeray; Thomy Bourdelle
- Cinematography: Christian Matras
- Music by: Georges Van Parys
- Production company: Compagnie Générale de Productions Cinématographiques
- Distributed by: SEDIF
- Release date: 3 August 1934
- Running time: 100 minutes
- Country: France
- Language: French

The House on the Dune (French: La maison dans la dune) is a 1934 French drama film directed by Pierre Billon and starring Pierre Richard-Willm, Madeleine Ozeray and Thomy Bourdelle. It is based on the 1932 novel The House on the Dune by Maxence Van Der Meersch. In 1952 the film was remade.

== Cast ==
- Pierre Richard-Willm as Sylvain
- Madeleine Ozeray as Pascaline
- Thomy Bourdelle as Lourges
- Colette Darfeuil as Germaine
- Raymond Cordy
- Odette Talazac
- Made Siamé
- Raymond Rognoni
- Alexandre Rignault
- Robert Ozanne
- Geno Ferny
- Teddy Michaud
- Roger Legris
- Franck Maurice

== Bibliography ==
- Philippe Rège. Encyclopedia of French Film Directors, Volume 1. Scarecrow Press, 2009.
