= Elie Che =

American transgender woman (1998–2020)

- Born: 10 April 1998; Atlanta, Georgia
- Died: 31 August 2020 (aged 22); The Bronx, New York, US
- Cause of death: Drowning

Elie Che (10 April 1998 – 31 August 2020) was an American transgender woman. Her death in August 2020 became high-profile due to her prominence in the London queer nightlife scene, as well as the cultural focus on the deaths of transgender people due to their disproportionately shorter life expectancy.

== Life and career ==
Che was born on 10 April 1998. She had relocated to New York City from Atlanta shortly before her death, to pursue her transition surrounded by other trans women of colour. Che had previously lived in London for three years where she has been described as a trans icon. She hoped to find work in fashion. Che had walked for runway shows, as well as posed for multiple magazines. Che was featured in the BBC's Other Voices documentary series. She also wrote a poem for the documentary.

Before her death, Che had been crowdfunding to support her move to New York and her medical transition, and had told supporters of her GoFundMe that her goal was to live past the age of 35.

== Death ==
Che was found dead at the water's edge at Orchard Beach in The Bronx, New York, on Monday, 31 August 2020. Her death was ruled as accidental drowning. She was 22 years old at the time of death.

Before the cause of death was revealed, many media outlets and trans rights activists wrongly assumed that it was related to violence since transgender women of color are frequently the target of hate crimes. The National Center for Transgender Quality reported that 28 transgender people had been murdered in the first half of 2020, compared to 26 for all of 2019. Of these 28 victims, 23 had been transgender women, with the NCTQ noting that "the epidemic of violence is particularly pronounced for Black and Latina trans women."

The London Trans+ Pride event in 2020 was held in honour of Elie Che.

== See also ==
- Transgender history in the United Kingdom
- Transgender history in the United States
