= Alexander Polycleitos Cawadias =

Greek physician (1884–1971)

Alexander Polycleitos Cawadias (Kavvadias) FRCP, OBE
- Born: 3 or 20 May 1884; Athens, Greece
- Died: 20 November 1971 (aged 87)
- Education: University of Paris
- Medical career
- Profession: Physician
- Sub-specialties: Endocrinology, homeopathy
- Notable works: Hermaphroditos the Human Intersex (1943)

Signature
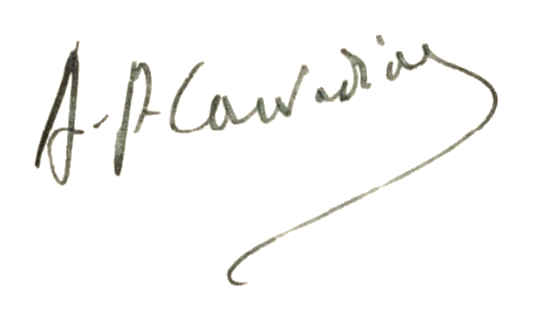

Alexander Polycleitos Cawadias FRCP OBE (3 or 20 May 1884 – 20 November 1971) was a Greek physician who worked mainly in England. He was an advocate of neo-Hippocratism, holistic medicine, and homeopathy. He argued in his book Hermaphroditos the Human Intersex (1943) that human gender was a continuum and intersexuality a normal phenomenon. He denied there was such a thing as a true hermaphrodite and saw all humans as somewhere between male and female.

== Early life and family ==
Alexander Polycleitos Cawadias was born in Athens on 3 or 20 May 1884. His father was the archaeologist, professor Panagiotis Kavvadias (1848–1928), who was one of the founding members of the modern Academy of Athens. He received his basic education at the local gymnasium and later studied philosophy at Montpellier University and Paris, following which, in 1901, he took his baccalaureate at the University of Paris.

In 1914 he married Sophie Victoria Constantinides (died 1967), a banker's daughter, and they had one son, Constantine George Alexander and a daughter, Mary Xenia. Their daughter became Lady Henderson.

== Career ==
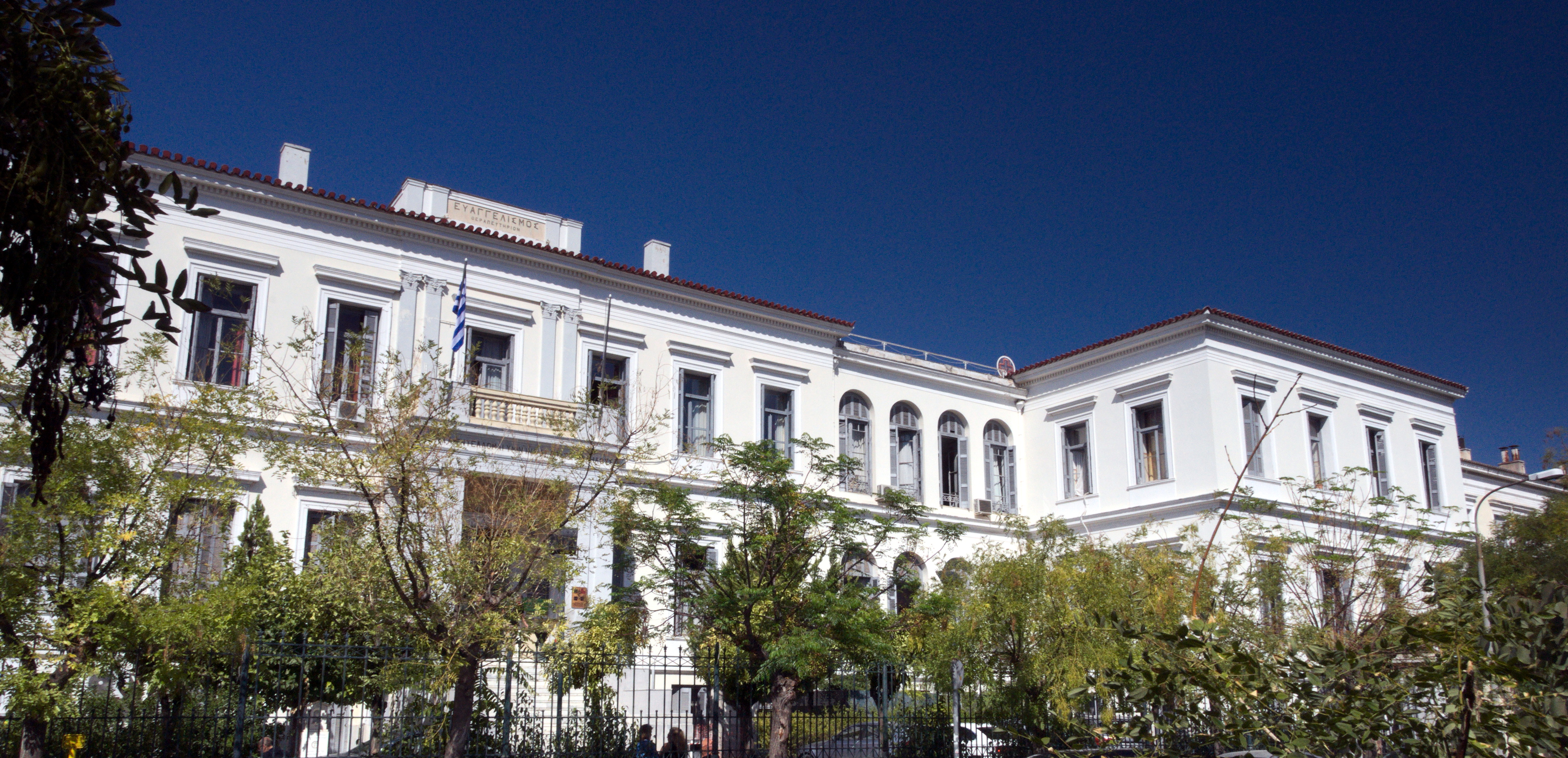
Evangelismos Hospital, Athens

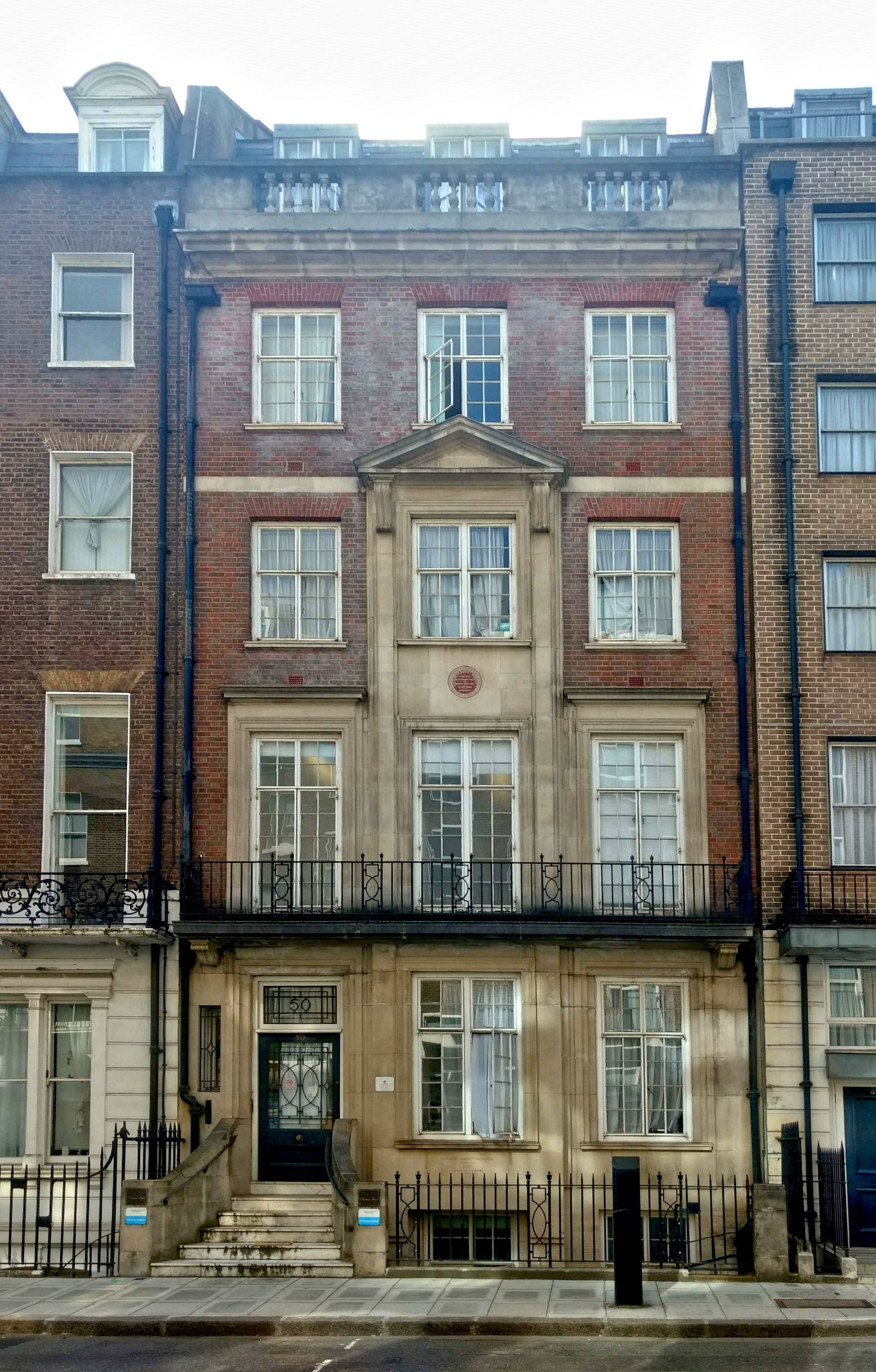
50 Wimpole Street, London

From 1906 to 1910 Cawadias was resident physician at the Paris teaching hospital, from where he received his MD in 1910. In 1912, he became Chef de Clinique under professor Chantemesse in the Paris faculty and also interne des hôpitaux under professor Robin. He worked during the cholera epidemic in Salonika during the Balkan War of 1912-13, and during the First World War he served as a liaison officer in the British sector for which he was appointed to the Order of the British Empire in 1918.

He was a staunch royalist, and in 1914 he was made chief of the medical clinic at the Evangelismos Hospital in Athens on the recommendation of Queen Olga of Greece. He moved to Britain in 1926 and obtained his MD from Durham University the same year. He developed a successful practice at number 52, and later 50, Wimpole Street, London, among wealthy Greek émigrés and other foreigners in Britain, specialising in diseases of endocrinology and the metabolism.

He was an advocate of neo-Hippocratism and believed in treating the whole patient. The resurgence in neo-Hippocratism in Britain in the interwar period has been seen as a reaction to the growing systematisation and professionalism of medicine which some physicians saw as reductionist and failing to treat the whole person. Cawadias was also a committed homeopath, claiming to use the therapy on up to 80% of his patients in the 1930s, and attempting to integrate "scientific homeopathy" with mainstream medicine for which his neo-Hippocratism served as a vehicle.

Cawadias was known for his intelligence and sparking conversation. He was a knowledgeable historian of medicine, and was president of the History of Medicine Society of the Royal Society of Medicine from 1937 to 1939.

In 1943 he argued in his book Hermaphroditos the Human Intersex that human gender was a continuum with no absolute male or female, and that intersexuality was a normal phenomenon. He denied there was such a thing as a true hermaphrodite, describing it as the "non-existent third sex".

According to a patient's memoirs, around 1955 Cawadias diagnosed George Turtle as a "hermaphrodite" with "dominant female characteristics". Cawadias carried out a thorough physical examination that Turtle had not previously received, gave definitive answers as to the gender characteristics of Turtle's body, and recommended oestrogen therapy. He cautiously agreed with Turtle's wish for a "change of sexual role". Turtle's gender at birth was later officially changed from male to female, with the help of affidavits from Cawadias and others, and Turtle took the name Georgina Somerset.

== Later life ==
In 1962, at the age of 78, Cawadias returned to Athens where he wrote and lectured. He died on 20 November 1971.

== Selected publications ==
- Diseases of the Intestines. Baillière & Co., London, 1927.
- The Modern Therapeutics of Internal Diseases: An Introduction to Medical Practice. Baillière & Co., London, 1931.
- Hermaphroditos the Human Intersex. Heinemann Medical Books, 1943.
- Clinical Endocrinology and Constitutional Medicine. Frederick Muller, London, 1947.
- "Theophile de Bordeu: An Eighteenth Century Pioneer in Endocrinology", Proceedings of the Royal Society of Medicine, Vol. 93, 1 February 1950, pp. 93–98. doi:10.1177/003591575004300218

=== Correspondence ===
- "Neo-hippocratism". Letter to British Medical Journal, 7 November 1931, p. 869.
