= Mary Henderson (journalist) =

Greek-born British journalist and embassy host (1919–2004)

Mary Henderson OBE
- Born: Maria Xenia Cawadias; 29 March 1919; Athens, Greece
- Died: 22 January 2004 (aged 84); London, England, United Kingdom
- Citizenship: United Kingdom
- Education: Queen's College, London
- Occupations: Journalist; Host
- Spouses: Stephen Barber (divorced) Sir Nicholas Henderson (m. 1951)
- Children: Alexandra Henderson
- Awards: Officer of the Order of the British Empire

Mary Xenia Henderson, Lady Henderson OBE (née Cawadias; 29 March 1919 – 22 January 2004) was a Greek-born British journalist and host. She worked as a nurse during the Second World War and went on to be a journalist for both the magazines Life and Time covering the Greek Civil War and was the sole female correspondent reporting on the conflict. Henderson was a host at various embassies around the world and published her memoirs in 1988. She was appointed Officer of the Order of the British Empire in 1988.

== Early life ==
On 29 March 1919, Henderson was born Maria Xenia Cawadias in Athens, Greece. She was the daughter of Alexander Polycleitos Cawadias, the physician to George II of Greece, the King of Greece, and head of Greece's largest teaching hospital called the Evangelimos. Henderson had one brother. An ancestor of Henderson's was an archbishop who fought against the Turkish in the Greek War of Independence and her grandfather, Panagiotis Kavvadias, established a museum on the Acropolis.

Following the monarch's abdication in 1924 and move to exile in London, she and her family moved to Wimpole Street in Central London. Henderson was raised to be pro-British and educated to believe English people, particularly Lord Byron, were "blond gods, who could do no wrong." She was educated at Queen's College in Harley Street, and subsequently passed the entry examination to study medicine at the University of Oxford but her father barred her from attending the university since he did not want his daughter to be "blue-stocking".

== Career ==
Henderson instead went holidaying in Greece with her mother in mid-1939 but was advised by her father to remain in the country when the Second World War began until there was no danger from German bombing. She trained as a nurse applying to the Greek Voluntary Red Cross and successfully passed all her examinations and obtained a role working at a first aid station in Athens. Henderson treated war casualties from the Albanian front at a military hospital, but was suspected by the German authorities and arrested by the SS for helping British servicemen in a soup kitchen during the resulting famine. The Gestapo sentenced her to death for providing the Allies with assistance, but she was liberated from the execution camp she was detained in under solitary confinement close to Athens just before liberation.

Between 1946 and 1949, Henderson worked as a journalist for the magazines Life and Time covering the Greek Civil War against the Guerrilla and Elas Communist factions. She was the sole female correspondent reporting on the war, and learned journalism under Patrick O'Donovan, the foreign correspondent of The Observer, while residing at the Hotel Grande Bretagne in Athens, Greece. Henderson became a hostess following her marriage to a diplomat and followed him to Bonn, Madrid, Paris, Santiago, Vienna, Washington, D.C., and Warsaw. She decorated every embassy she and her husband resided in. Henderson decorated the British ambassador's house in Berlin in the style of William Morris and Augustus Pugin and the Washington embassy received a Laura Ashley decor. Her three-time a week dinner and luncheon engagements were scheduled six months before they happened.

Henderson worked for the magazine Africa in Spain and set up a cooking school with a chef in Paris. She authored Paris Embassy Cook Book in 1980. In 1988, Henderson's memoirs, Xenia: A Memoir, were published. She was an advisor to the British Fashion Council and received its highest honour, the Hall of Fame Award.

== Personal life ==
She was appointed Officer of the Order of the British Empire "for services to British Fashion Design" in 1988. Henderson was first married to the journalist Stephen Barber but she later divorced him due to incompatibility. She was subsequently married to the British ambassador Nicholas Henderson from 19 December 1951 until her death from pneumonia in London on 22 January 2004. They have a daughter, who is married to Derry Moore, 12th Earl of Drogheda.

== Legacy ==
Michael Packenam said of Henderson: "Mary Henderson was an icon of style. But her achievements as an ambassadress were exceptional. She brought a formidable set of talents to the job, and she did see it – sometimes a little cynically – as a job, and not a vocation." Caroline Charles noted Henderson had "brought glamour and international knowledge and funding" to the fashion industry along with bringing well-known individuals together. Mary Galea Debono of Pink magazine calls her "a perfectionist" who "redefined the role of a diplomat's wife" with her focus on style.
