= Bodies and Souls (novel) =

1943 novel by Maxence Van der Meersch

- Author: Maxence Van der Meersch
- Original title: Corps et âmes
- Translator: Eithne Wilkins
- Language: French
- Publisher: Éditions Albin Michel
- Publication date: 1943
- Publication place: France
- English publication date: 1948
- Pages: 710

Bodies and Souls (French: Corps et âmes) is a 1943 novel by the French writer Maxence Van der Meersch. It is set in the medical profession in France, describing procedures in detail and covering intrigues, personal ambitions, political involvement and corruption. The book was published by éditions Albin Michel in France and in English translation by Eithne Wilkins in 1948.

The novel was the basis for the 1949 American film The Doctor and the Girl directed by Curtis Bernhardt.
