= Neo-Hippocratism =

Neo-Hippocratism was an influential movement and was the subject of numerous conversations and theorizations between the seventeenth and mid-nineteenth centuries. The movement saw a revival in popularity with physicians after the First World War. It sought to reappraise the role of Hippocrates and Hippocratic medicine and was closely associated with the idea of the holistic treatment of the patient.

The popularity of neo-Hippocratism has been seen as a reaction to the growing systematisation and professionalism of medicine which some physicians saw as reductionist and failing to treat the whole person. Neo-Hippocratism is described as a rational and methodical method of seeing the body as a whole. Of examining a human in their entirety and “considers all medical and or internistic therapeutic agents- psychical, dietetic, chemical, biological, and physical- and applies them according to the indications of the individual patient under severe control of the continuous diagnosis of the person.

== History ==
The expression "neo-hippocratism" is said to have been first coined by Arturo Castiglioni in 1926. One of the movement's principal promoters was Alexander Polycleitos Cawadias (1884–1971).
