= The House on the Dune (novel) =

1932 novel

- Author: Maxence Van Der Meersch
- Language: French
- Genre: Crime
- Publication date: 1932
- Publication place: France
- Media type: Print

The House on the Dune (French: La maison dans la dune) is a 1932 novel by the French writer Maxence Van Der Meersch. It portrays the battle between smugglers and customs officials along the French-Belgian border.

== Adaptations ==
It has been turned into films on three occasions:

- The House on the Dune (1934 film), a French film directed by Pierre Billon
- The House on the Dune (1952 film), a French film directed by Georges Lampin
- The House on the Dune (1988 film), a Belgian film directed by Michel Mees

== Bibliography ==
- Philip Mosley. Split Screen: Belgian Cinema and Cultural Identity. SUNY Press, 2001.
