= Georgina Somerset =

British dentist and author

Georgina Carol Somerset
- Born: George Edwin Turtle; 23 March 1923; Purley, England, UK
- Died: 30 November 2013 (aged 90)
- Other name: Georgina Carol Turtle
- Education: King's College Hospital
- Occupations: Dentist; Royal Navy officer
- Spouse: Christopher Somerset (1962–2013; her death)

Georgina Carol Somerset (née Turtle; 23 March 1923 – 30 November 2013) was a British dentist, author, and former Royal Navy officer. She was the first openly intersex person in the United Kingdom and the first intersex woman to be married in the Church of England.

== Early life ==
Somerset was born on 23 March 1923 in Purley and christened George Edwin Turtle. Her birth was registered outside of the usual time limit because of confusion as to her sex. Ultimately, the obstetricians decided to assign her male. She was educated at Purley High School for Boys, a grammar school in Croydon and Reigate Grammar School, an all-boys free school. She went on to study dentistry at King's College Hospital, London and qualified in 1944.

== Career ==
As a newly qualified dentist, Somerset was called up to the Royal Navy Volunteer Reserve as the Second World War was coming to an end. She was promoted to temporary surgeon-lieutenant on 27 March 1946 with seniority from 21 September 1945. She left the military in 1948.

Upon returning to civilian life, she established a dental practice in Croydon, London. In early 1960, she sold this practice and moved to Hove, East Sussex, where she ran another dental practice until retiring in 1985. Somerset wrote two books: Over The Sex Border published in 1963 and her memoir A Girl Called Georgina published in 1992.

== Personal life ==
Somerset's father was a Freemason and initiated both his sons into the Craft in 1945. She rose to become Worshipful Master of her Lodge but resigned from the craft in 1953. Having felt female from a young age, Somerset underwent gender-affirming surgery in January 1957. She had previously been rejected by the eminent plastic surgeon Sir Harold Gillies, as she had turned up to her appointment in male morning dress. He explained “I do not really think you look or could be made to look like a woman.” In 1960, after sworn testimony from her doctors, she was given a new birth certificate with her chosen name of Georgina Carol Turtle and her sex as female.

In June 1962, her engagement to Christopher Somerset, distantly related to the Duke of Beaufort, was announced in the Court and Social page of The Daily Telegraph. They married in St Margaret's, Westminster, London, in October 1962. This made her the first known woman to marry in a church after officially changing sex.

== Death ==
Georgina Somerset died on 30 November 2013, aged 90.

== Publications ==
- Over The Sex Border. Victor Gollancz, London, 1963. (Foreword by Kenneth Walker)
- A Girl Called Georgina. The Book Guild, Lewes, 1992. ISBN 0863327850
- "A Girl Called Georgina", Journal of the Royal Society of Medicine. Vol. 87, No. 9 (1994), p. 573.
