= Victoria McCloud =

British lawyer and judge (born 1969)

King's (formerly Queen's) Bench Master
- In office 2010 – April 2024
- Monarchs: Elizabeth II (until 2022); Charles III (2022–2024)

Personal details
- Born: 13 October 1969 (age 56) Surrey, England
- Domestic partner: Annie McCloud
- Education: University of Oxford; City University
- Profession: Barrister and chartered psychologist

Victoria Helen McCloud (née Williams; born 13 October 1969) is a British lawyer and former judge. A trans woman since the 1990s, McCloud was the youngest Master in the High Court of Justice when appointed in 2006 as a deputy and then as a full master in 2010. McCloud is also a chartered psychologist and legal author. She retired from the bench in April 2024.

== Early life and education ==
McCloud was born in Surrey, England on 13 October 1969. She was inspired become a lawyer, as a child, after watching the television series Crown Court. She has also written of the inspiration of her ancestor Sarah Jane Rees (1839–1916), a master mariner and poet who in the National Eisteddfod of Wales of 1865 became the first woman ever to win the Bardic crown.

McCloud graduated from Christ Church, Oxford in 1990 with a degree in Experimental Psychology and obtained a doctorate in 1993 in human visual system science. A year later, McCloud completed a law conversion course and was called to the bar in 1995. Three years later came a change of name and a transition to female.

== Career ==
As a barrister, McCloud joined Coram Chambers and was a member of the Bar Equality and Diversity Committee from 2004 to 2010. From 2006, McCloud was a Deputy Costs Judge / Taxing Master, and then in June 2010 was appointed as a Master of the Senior Courts, Queen's Bench Division, becoming the youngest ever Master in the High Court, the first trans person, and the second woman ever to have been given the position. In 2017, McCloud was appointed as a Costs Judge / Taxing Master.

As Victoria Williams, McCloud wrote the first five editions of the Civil Procedure Handbook and the Surveillance and Intelligence Law Handbook for Oxford University Press.

In a letter from Master McCloud, in November 2019, she said "I suspect that such limited success as I had later in life fluking my way to winning the odd case as a barrister may well have been more about grinding down my opponents, not giving up but doggedly carrying on annoyingly to the end, than due to any great forensic brilliance. I gather the Komodo Dragon does much the same: bite the prey and then follow it for miles, sometimes nipping at its heels, until it expires and becomes the next meal."

In 2016 McCloud began consulting with professionals working in the historic abuse field, hoping to improve the experience of justice for victims as well as for defendants and insurers, founding the Historic Abuse Lawyers' forum (HALF) to look at the possibility of alternative approaches to trial and resolution.

McCloud has presided over high-profile cases which have involved Donald Trump, Jeremy Corbyn, Katie Price, and Andrew Mitchell MP. Other legal judicial decisions include asbestos-related disease cases, such as Yates v HMRC, constitutional rights of access to justice and access to court proceedings, modern slavery, defamation law, equitable interpleader, and national security. Her decision in Warsama and Gannon v FCO and others considered UK constitutional issues under the Bill of Rights 1689, Parliamentary Privilege, free speech and human rights.

McCloud resigned as a judge in February 2024, stating that "I have reached the conclusion that in 2024 the national situation and present judicial framework is no longer such that it is possible in a dignified way to be both 'trans' and a salaried, fairly prominent judge in the UK". She subsequently moved to the Republic of Ireland.

In March 2024, it was revealed that McCloud was seeking leave to join the litigation in the Supreme Court case For Women Scotland Ltd v The Scottish Ministers. This application to intervene by McCloud and Stephen Whittle for the Good Law Project was rejected by the Supreme Court in October 2024. Following the ruling, which defined "woman" and "sex" for the purposes of the Equality Act 2010 as referring to "biological woman and biological sex" (i.e. not assigned sex), McCloud said she would go to the European Court of Human Rights (ECHR) to seek judgment against the British government and Supreme Court for failing to consider the "fundamental human rights" of trans people.

== Personal life ==
McCloud, who is also a chartered psychologist, authored (as Victoria Williams) an academic letter in 2003 to a Royal College of Psychiatrists's journal Psychiatric Bulletin, that considered standards of care for transgender people and highlighted errors in a paper published in the journal.

McCloud lived in London with National Health Service psychiatrist Annie McCloud before moving to Ireland. They have been civil partners since 2006.
