= Maxence Van der Meersch =

French writer (1907–1951)

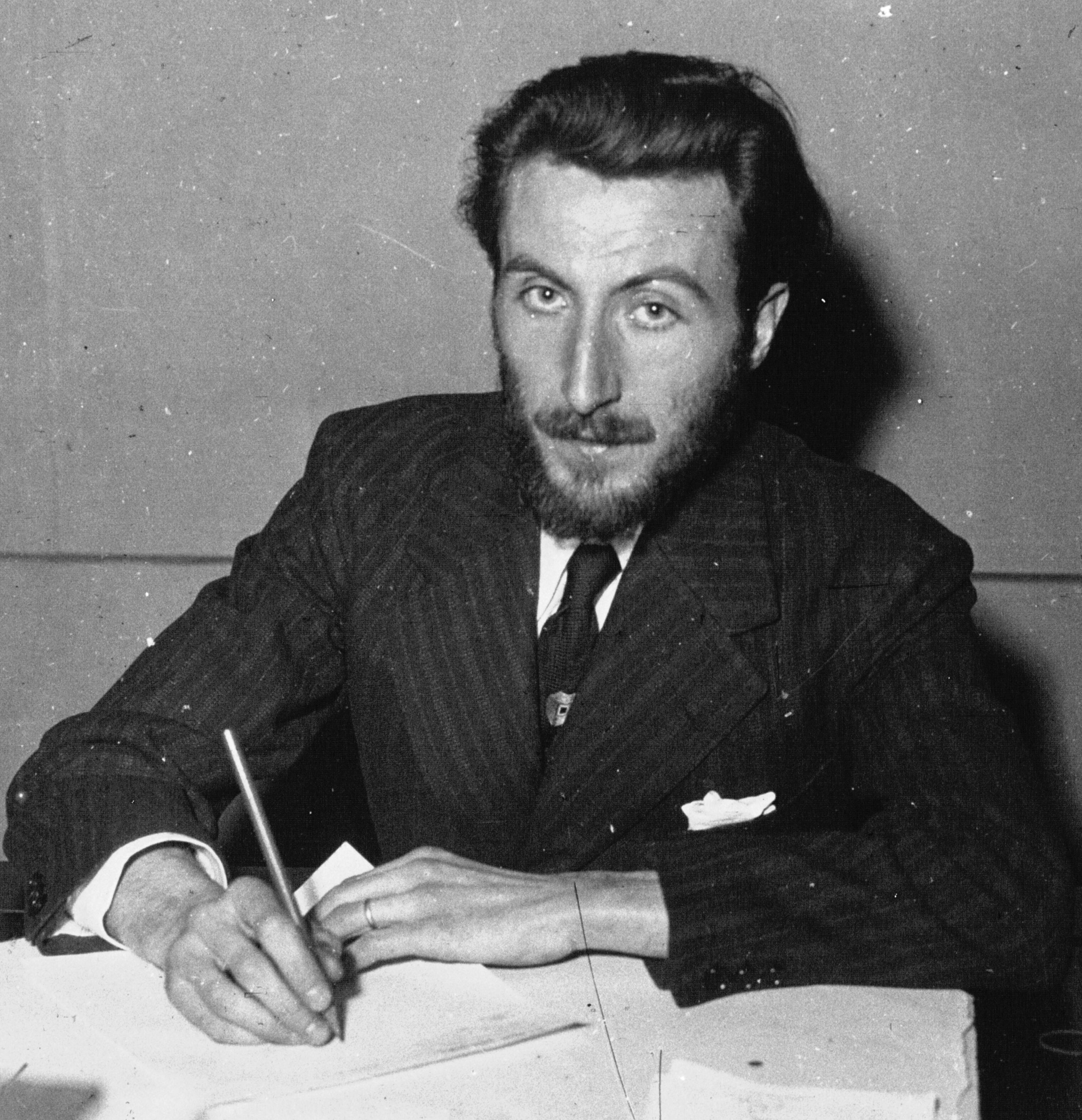
Maxence Van der Meersch

Maxence Van der Meersch (French pronunciation: [maksɑ̃s vɑ̃ dɛʁ mɛʁʃ]; 4 May 1907 – 14 January 1951) was a French Flemish writer.

== Life ==
Maxence, of delicate health, came from a relatively well off family — his father was an accountant. On 27 October 1918, he lost his sister, Sarah, who was just 19 years old, to tuberculosis, the disease that would eventually kill him too. His parents' marriage broke up. Marguerite, his mother, became an alcoholic, and his father, Benjamin, lived a life considered dissolute by the standards of the times. In 1927, Maxence fell in love with Thérèze Denis, a poor working-class girl, with whom he lived in Wasquehal, against the wishes of his father, who dreamt of a more prestigious union for his son. In 1929, from this union that was only regularised in 1934, a daughter, Sarah, was born, named in memory of his sister. Thérèze was the only love of Maxence's life and is the key to an understanding of his work. She was the inspiration for the protagonist of his trilogy La Fille pauvre (The Poor Girl).

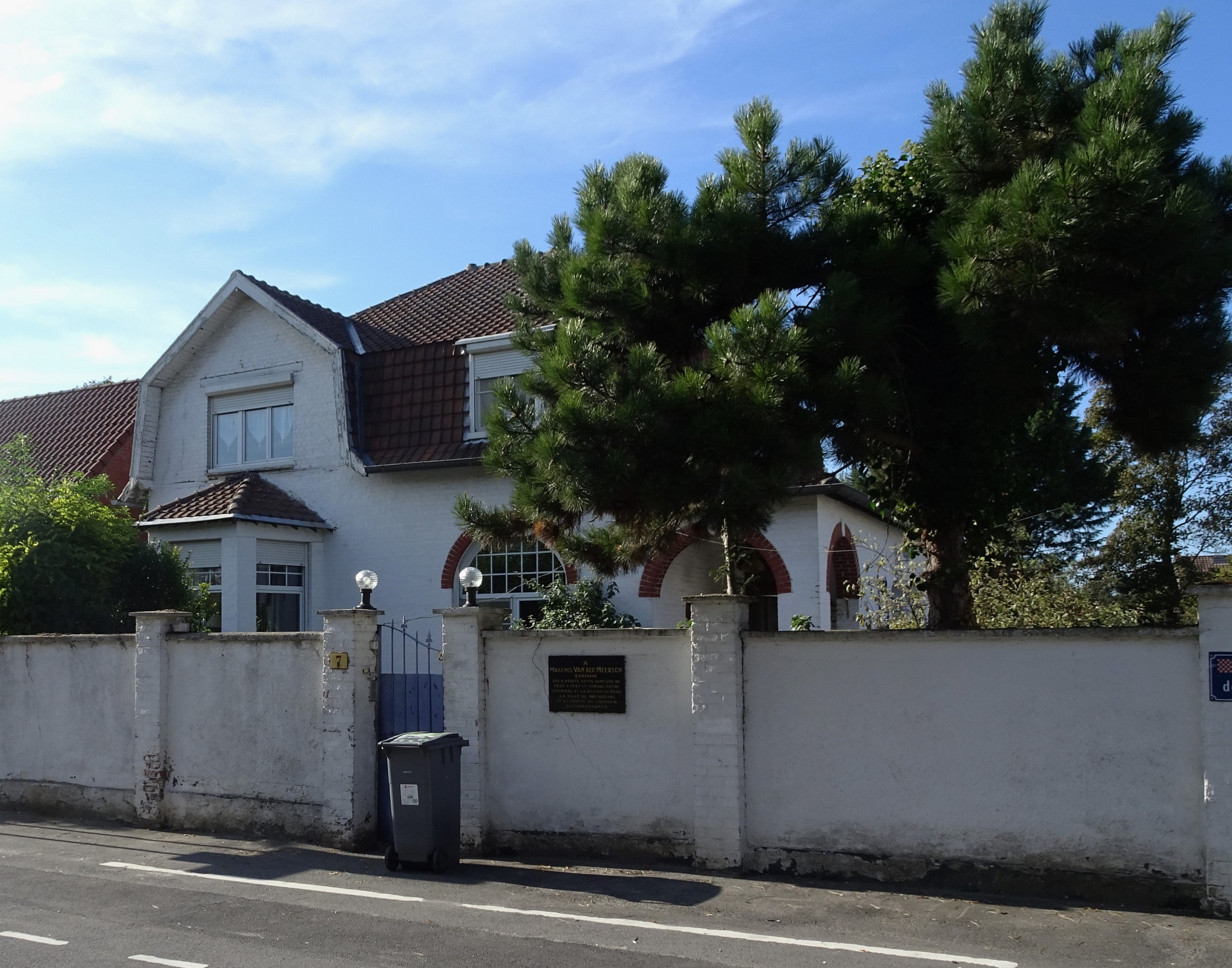
House where Maxence Van der Meersch lived in Wasquehal

A lawyer by training, he in fact practiced this profession very little, preferring to devote himself to writing. His work, replete with a spirit of realism, is essentially concerned with the life of the people of the Nord, his native region. In 1936 he was awarded the Prix Goncourt for L'Empreinte du dieu (Hath Not the Potter). In 1943 he published Corps et âmes (Bodies and Souls), which was awarded the grand prix de l'Académie française for that year. The novel was an international success — it was translated into 13 languages. It centred round the ideas of a celebrated doctor, Dr. Paul Carton (1875-1947), for whom Van der Meersch had a profound admiration. Carton emphasised the importance of cleanliness and good day-to-day living, work environment, nutrition etc.: "Le microbe n'est rien. Le terrain est tout." ("The germ is nothing. The terrain is everything.") The protagonists of the novel are followers of Carton.

Van der Meersch came from a family of freethinkers — his father was a Nietzschean atheist — but he converted to Roman Catholicism in 1936. He wrote two religious biographies, one of the Curé d'Ars and the other of Thérèse of Lisieux. Quand les sirènes se taisent (1933) is set against the background of the Worker-priest movement active during strikes in northern French factories during the inter-war period. L'Elu (1936) explores the theme of the influence of the Flemish and latent religious past among a family of ostensibly successful rationalists.

Van der Meersch experienced great success in his lifetime, but today he has a far lower profile. Nevertheless, in 2010 some half a dozen of his books were still in print in France. In 1998 La société des Amis de Van der Meersch was created by a group of his admirers. In 1988 his first novel, La Maison dans la dune (1932), was made into a film by Michel Mees, with Tchéky Karyo in the principal role.

== Criticism ==
The sometimes iconoclastic, distinguished historian Richard Cobb called van der Meersch "a regionalist who had written almost exclusively about Roubaix and who had brought honour to the town by winning the Prix Goncourt." In Cobb's opinion, "He was, in fact, a clumsy stylist, a Christian-Socialist Zola, who wrote off an accumulated stock of fiches [files]." (Fiches meaning dossiers of people taken from real sources).

== Death ==
He died in Le Touquet in 1951. He had gone there to be treated for tuberculosis.

== Publications ==
=== Fiction ===
- La Maison dans la dune (1932) — The House on the Dune (1938)
- Car ils ne savent ce qu'ils font... (1933) — They Know Not What They Do (1958)
- Quand les sirènes se taisent (1933) — When the Looms Are Silent (1934)
- La fille pauvre Tome I: Le Péché du monde (1934) — The Poor Girl Book I: The Sins of the World (1949)
- Invasion 14 (1934) — Invasion '14 (1937)
- Maria, fille de Flandre (1935) — The Bellringer's Wife (1951)
- L'Empreinte du dieu (1936) — Hath Not the Potter (1937)
- Pêcheurs d'hommes (1936) — Fishers of Men (1947)
- L'Elu (1936) — The Dynamite Factory (1953)
- Corps et âmes (1943) — Bodies and Souls (1948)
- La fille pauvre Tome II: Le Cœur Pur (1948) — The Poor Girl Book II: Pure in Heart (1949)
- La fille pauvre Tome III: La Compagne (1955) — The Hour of Love: The Poor Girl Book III (1956)
- Masque de chair (1958) — Mask of Flesh (1959)

=== Nonfiction ===
- Vie du Curé d'Ars (1936)
- Femmes à l'encan (1943) (an essay against prostitution)
- La petite sainte Thérèse (1943)
- Pourquoi j'ai écrit Corps et âmes (1956) (an essay in defence of Cartonian medicine)
