= Hard Rock Live (Atlantic City, New Jersey) =

Multi-purpose arena in New Jersey, United States

Mark G. Etess Arena
- Interactive map of Mark G. Etess Arena
- Full name: Hard Rock Live at Mark G. Etess Arena
- Former names: The Arena at Trump Taj Mahal (planning); Etess Arena (1990–2016)
- Address: 1000 Boardwalk, 08401-7415
- Location: Hard Rock Hotel & Casino, Atlantic City, New Jersey
- Coordinates: 39°21′31.15″N 74°25′11.2″W
- Owner: Hard Rock International
- Operator: Hard Rock Entertainment
- Capacity: 7,000 (2018–present); 5,200 (1991–2016)
- Public transit: Atlantic City Rail Terminal (via shuttle) Atlantic City Line

Construction
- Opened: April 28, 1990; 36 years ago (as Etess Arena)
- Renovated: 2017–2018
- Closed: October 10, 2016; 10 years ago (as Etess Arena)
- Reopened: June 29, 2018; 8 years ago (as Hard Rock)

Website
- Official website

The Mark G. Etess Arena (known as Hard Rock Live at Mark G. Etess Arena for commercial reasons) is a multi-purpose arena in Atlantic City, New Jersey located at the Hard Rock Hotel & Casino, formerly the Trump Taj Mahal. Originally opening in April 1990, the arena seats over 5,000 for music and sporting events.

== About ==
=== Namesake ===
Mark Grossinger Etess (1958–1989) was the grandson of Grossinger's Catskill Resort Hotel official Jennie Grossinger who later became an executive at Golden Nugget Hotel & Casinos as the vice president for marketing for the Atlantic Club Casino Hotel. He left Golden Nugget for the Trump Organization as the president and chief operating officer for Trump Sports and Entertainment, including Trump Plaza and later Trump Taj Mahal. At the time, Mark Etess had put Trump in the boxing world as the Trump Organisation hosted notable Mike Tyson championship bouts against Tyrell Biggs, Larry Holmes, Michael Spinks, and Carl Williams.

On October 10, 1989, Etess, along with Stephen Hyde and Jonathan Benanav, two other officials at Trump properties in Atlantic City, attended a media conference at Plaza Hotel in New York City for the Héctor Camacho, Sr. vs Vinny Pazienza boxing contest scheduled on February 3, 1990 at the Atlantic City Convention Center for Camacho's WBO Junior Welterweight Championship. The event was promoted by Main Events Boxing, with Trump being the host for the event. After the media event, the trio of Trump executives boarded a Paramount Aviation Agusta A109 helicopter to return to Atlantic City. The helicopter suffered a mechanical failure from metal fatigue of the blades, leading into a crash killing the three executives.

The Trump Taj Mahal arena was named in Etess' memory.

==== Venue ====
Despite the Indian theme of the Trump Taj Mahal, the Etess Arena was designed with a contemporary feel, based upon the club scene in England.

The venue's first concert performance was by Elton John on May 18, 1990. Donald Trump was originally in negotiations to have Madonna open the venue during her Blond Ambition World Tour (1990), but plans fell through. Her first concert in Atlantic City came 16 years later during her Confessions Tour, which was held at the Boardwalk Hall.

As part of the resort's sale to the Seminole Tribe of Florida, who rebuilt it as the Hard Rock Hotel & Casino Atlantic City, the venue reopened as Hard Rock Live on June 29, 2018. Boxing and mixed martial arts matches are also held in the arena.

== Noted performers ==
- Aerosmith
- Alan Jackson
- Alice in Chains
- Alicia Keys
- A-Mei
- The Allman Brothers Band
- Backstreet Boys
- Barry Manilow
- Beyoncé
- Bob Dylan
- The Brian Setzer Orchestra
- Britney Spears
- Celine Dion
- Christina Aguilera
- Crosby, Stills & Nash
- Culture Club
- Daughtry
- Dave Chappelle
- Diana Ross
- Donna Summer
- The Doobie Brothers
- Earth, Wind & Fire
- En Vogue
- Elton John
- Fleetwood Mac
- Frankie Beverly and Maze
- Green Day
- Guns N' Roses
- Hall and Oates
- Heart
- Hilary Duff
- James Taylor
- Janet Jackson
- Jennifer Lopez
- The Jonas Brothers
- K-Ci & JoJo
- KC and the Sunshine Band
- Kid Rock
- KISS
- Laura Pausini
- Limp Bizkit
- Lionel Richie
- Little Richard
- Luis Miguel
- Luther Vandross
- Marc Anthony
- Mariah Carey
- Martina McBride
- Michael Bolton
- Michael Crawford
- The Moody Blues
- Mötley Crüe
- Natalie Cole
- New Kids On The Block
- Nickelback
- Paramore
- Phil Collins
- Queens of the Stone Age
- Ratdog
- Rick Astley
- Ringo Starr & His All-Starr Band
- Rush
- Salt-n-Pepa
- Santana
- Sarah Brightman
- Sarah McLachlan
- Shakira
- Shirley Bassey
- Simon & Garfunkel
- Sonu Nigam
- Steve Winwood
- Stevie Nicks
- Stevie Wonder
- Sting
- Tina Turner
- Van Halen
- Village People
- Widespread Panic
- Yes
