= The Paramount (Parksville, New York) =

- Interactive map of the The Paramount area
- Alternative names: Best Western Paramount

General information
- Status: Abandoned
- Type: Hotel
- Location: 1 Tanzman Road, Parksville, New York, United States
- Coordinates: 41.858052°N 74.750665°W
- Opened: 1903
- Cost: $5,000,000

Height
- Top floor: 4

Technical details
- Floor area: 85,000 sq ft (7,900 m^{2})

Other information
- Number of rooms: 194

The Paramount also known as the Best Western Paramount, is a former hotel located in the Hamlet of Parksville, New York; Right outside of Liberty, New York. Today it remains abandoned after a fire in October 2000, which destroyed the lobby, the two-story office, the conference space, the kitchen and nightclub.

== History before the fire ==
The Paramount actually started off as a boarding house in 1903 when the first owner moved to Parksville because of tuberculosis. It eventually passed down to his grandson, Fred Gasthalter. As time went on, more buildings were added to the property.

In the 1960s the hotel was frequented by hunters who wanted a clean place to stay that offered fast and early breakfast.

The hotel joined the Best Western franchise and was now known as Best Western Paramount, still under the ownership of Fred Gasthalter. According to Fred, joining Best Western was "The greatest thing yet".

== The fire ==
On October 16, 2000, around 3 am the front desk received a call saying there was smoke in the kitchen, she then called 911 because of the report of smoke. Over 100 firefighters from 6 different companies responded to the fire, saving it from total destruction but failing to save the lobby, nightclub, kitchen and offices. The day before the fire the hotel was running a Jewish educational program, some of them were still staying at the hotel for a bit longer. It was a described as a "Nightmare". Over 300 guests, some disabled and many seniors, had to be evacuated.

== Sale ==
In 2004 The Paramount site was sold after the last operating owner filed for bankruptcy. Announced plans to rebuild never came to fruition. The property was again sold for $3.7 million to a Bronx developer who had plans to turn it into an amusement resort. This plan also stalled. As of June 2025 the estimated demolition cost was $2.5 million. There was still no concrete plan on the future of the site and the buildings remained in a derelict state.
