= Ferndale, New York =

Hamlet in New York, United States

Coordinates: 41°46′26″N 74°44′19″W

Ferndale is a hamlet in the Town of Liberty, Sullivan County, New York, United States. It is situated along the old alignment of New York Route 17 between Harris and Liberty. The zip code is 12734.

== Historic Places ==
The Shelburne Playhouse is listed under the National Register of Historic Places

The Ferndale School is listed under the National Register of Historic Places

Manion's General Store is listed under the National Register of Historic Places

Between 1968 and 2019, it was the site of Camp Shane, a weight loss camp for children.
