= Marion E. Wong =

American actor and producer (1895-1969)

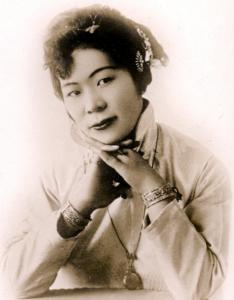
- Born: January 2, 1895; San Francisco, California, U.S.
- Died: February 4, 1969; Alameda, California, U.S.
- Occupations: Actress, producer, and director
- Parent(s): Jim Sing Wong, Chin See

Chinese name
- Chinese: 黃女娣
Transcriptions
Standard Mandarin
- Hanyu Pinyin: Huáng Nǚ Dì
- Wade–Giles: Huang^{4} Nü^{3}Di^{2}
Yue: Cantonese
- Yale Romanization: wong4 neoi5 dai6

Marion E. Wong (January 2, 1895 – February 4, 1969) was an American company director, costume designer, director, actress, producer, music performer and screenwriter.

== Biography ==
Marion Evelyn Wong was born on January 2, 1895, in San Francisco but was raised in Oakland, California. In 1911, Wong travelled to China to meet her future husband. Her two brothers, who were looking for wives, accompanied her. Due to citizenship policies at the time, the Wong siblings, who were all born and raised in California, would only be allowed to travel to China for one year or they would risk losing citizenship. As such, they had a condensed timeline during which they could find an appropriate suitor to bring back to the United States. One of her brothers died in China due to smallpox. The other brother, Albert Wong, married Violet, who was the sister-in-law to Marion. Violet would prove to become a lifelong supporter and friend in Marion's career, and would soon star in Wong's first motion picture. Wong returned home without a husband because she refused to marry him. Wong was also a student at the University of California for some time where she took up special work.

== The birth of the Mandarin Film Company ==
During the early 1900s, Wong had established a reputable career in Oakland as a singer-entertainer. In 1916, at the age of 21, she established the Mandarin Film Company. Her uncle, Ben Lim, described in a 1916 newspaper article as a “wealthy Chinese merchant and landowner”, provided the funding. She served as a writer, director, producer, designer, and actor for her works, establishing the company as a promising independent studio. At the time, the film industry was growing through the burgeoning studio system and models were still being established for how the industry would function. The Mandarin Film Company was the first Asian-American based film company and was entirely funded and produced by Asian American individuals.

== The Curse of Quon Gwon ==
Surviving footage from The Curse of Quon Gwon

Wong's trip to China also served as inspiration for The Curse of Quon Gwon: When the Far East Mingles with the West, her first film for the Mandarin Film Company. The film was regarded as the first Chinese-American feature film. The film was also written, produced, and directed by Wong, who also designed the costumes and sceneries. Marion also cast herself as one of the characters in the film. The Curse of Quon Gwon was the first and only film made by an all-Chinese cast and an all-Chinese company. An article in the July 17, 1917, issue of The Moving Picture World said that the film “deals with the curse of a Chinese god that follows his people because of the influence of western civilization.” It is also about Chinese assimilation into American society. The film was a familial labor of love, featuring sister-in-law Violet in the lead role, playing a modern Chinese American woman in San Francisco. Marion was also featured in the film in a smaller role, with parts also written for her mother, as well as Violet's daughter, Stella. Professional actor Henry Soo Hoo portrayed the romantic male lead. A professional actor, he and Violet's performances were celebrated as the heart of the film.

The primary inspiration for the film came from the Charlie Chaplin film A Night Out. Wong subsequently hired one of Chaplin's cameramen for the project. This resulted in a pristinely shot film, especially for independent standards.

In an Oakland Tribune article dated May 11, 1916, Wong said that she had never seen any Chinese movies.

''“…I decided to introduce them to the world. I first wrote the love story. Then I decided that people who are interested in my people and my country would like to see some of the customs and manners of China. So I added to the love drama many scenes depicting these things. I do hope it will be a success.”

A July 1917 edition of The Motion Picture World describes the plot.

“[The film] deals with the curse of a Chinese god that follows his people because of the influence of western civilization. The first part is taken in California, showing the intrigues of the Chinese who are living in this country in behalf of the Chinese monarchical government, and those who are working for the revolutionists in favor of a Chinese republic. A love story begins here and is carried through the rest of the production.”

Even with all of her efforts, The Curse of Quon Gwon only had two screenings after its completion. A rough cut of the film was viewed in 1916 at the Kinema Theater and a formal premiere of the film was shown in 1917 but the film did not receive commercial distribution. This is cited for many reasons, the key one being that distributors were worried audiences would not respond to an Asian American narrative that did not identify or celebrate the racist tropes that had become familiar to white audiences. The Curse of Quon Gwon does not feature any “calculating dragon ladies or bumbling coolies”, and as a result, distributors prevented the film from being seen across the nation, despite its critical acclaim and tremendous scope.

Seen as a financial failure, Wong asked her family to never speak of the film again. Her uncle Lim at this time also declared bankruptcy, for he did not see any possibility of return of his investment. Wong's company did not produce any other films after the financial failure of The Curse of Quon Gwon.

== After the Mandarin Film Company ==
In 1917, Wong married Kim Seung Hong (Chinese: 熊錦湘). He was the first Chinese student to graduate from the University of California – Berkeley and was the first Chinese electrical engineer in the country. After Kim and Wong got married, Wong founded the Singapor Hut restaurant in Richmond, California in 1919. The restaurant soon became popular for its musical cabarets. Wong performed everything from traditional Chinese operas to popular music at The Singapor Hut. During this time, Wong also toured in vaudeville as a singer and musician. Wong raised a family of entertainers as well, her daughter Arabella Hong-Young having attended Juilliard then continuing on to originate the role of Helen Chiao in Broadway's Flower Drum Song. Much like The Curse of Quon Gwon, Flower Drum Song is celebrated as a landmark in representation of Asian-Americans in American art. Wong died in 1969.

== Legacy ==
Despite not being interviewed about the film since 1917 or mentioning the film after its downfall, Wong's film came into the spotlight when two reels were found in an Oakland basement. Only two reels of the eight-reel film survive, and they do not explain the characters or plot. These reels are currently featured at the Oakland Museum of California.

Since its last screening in 1917, Wong's film was screened only twice over the following ninety years. It was shown once in 1948 at a public screening in Berkeley, California and once in 1974 at a screening for over seventy family members. The rediscovery of the film brought the film and Wong's children together since Wong's children were unaware of their mother's accomplishment. The film went on to receive greater recognition with the release of Hollywood Chinese, a documentary by Arthur Dong about the history of Chinese Americans in film. The film features The Curse of Quon Gwon prominently, including both excerpts and interviews from Violet's daughters.

Dong celebrates the significance of finding the lost reels of The Curse of Quon Gwon:

“I was astonished,” recalls Dong. “It’s like digging up an unknown species of dinosaurs. To actually locate these moving images on film and to meet descendants of the filmmakers inspired me to continue with the completion of Hollywood Chinese – this chapter of history confirms, for the first time, the contributions of Chinese Americans in the formative years of America’s film industry.”

The remaining footage from the film runs 35 minutes in total. The two reels found are labeled four and seven, leaving one to suspect that the entire film ran roughly ninety minutes in length. It is believed that the reels found come from the original negative, produced on 16mm film.

Hollywood Chinese also incited a historical stamp for the film when, thirty-six years after Wong's death, in 2006, The Curse of Quon Gwon was successfully added to the National Film Registry and catalogued with the Library of Congress. With only 25 films accepted annually, this motion picture was considered historic for the history of Asian American cinema. Currently, there is still a hope for the resurgence of both the shooting script and the missing reels of The Curse of Quon Gwon. The film in its current form has an original score composed by Judy Rosenberg and has had screenings at universities and theaters across the globe.

The surviving reels of The Curse of Quon Gwon were preserved by the Academy Film Archive in 2005.
