= Beheading the Chinese Prisoner =

- Produced by: Siegmund Lubin
- Release date: 1900
- Running time: 42 seconds
- Country: United States
- Language: Silent

Beheading the Chinese Prisoner, also known as Beheading a Chinese Prisoner, was a 1900 silent film produced by Siegmund Lubin. The 42-second-long film, which was inspired by news reports of the Boxer Rebellion, was produced on the roof of the Lubin Studios building in Philadelphia.

It is considered an early example of "yellowface", and is featured in Arthur Dong's 2007 documentary film Hollywood Chinese.

== Description of the film ==
A Chinese prisoner is tried before one of the chiefs, and being found guilty, is sentenced to be beheaded, which sentence is immediately executed. The executioner displays the head to the spectators to serve as a warning for evil doers. Very exciting.

— Lubin Catalog, 1903.

== Status ==
A print of Beheading is kept in the George Eastman House International Museum of Photography and Film.
