= Allan Bérubé =

American historian, activist, and scholar (1946–2007)

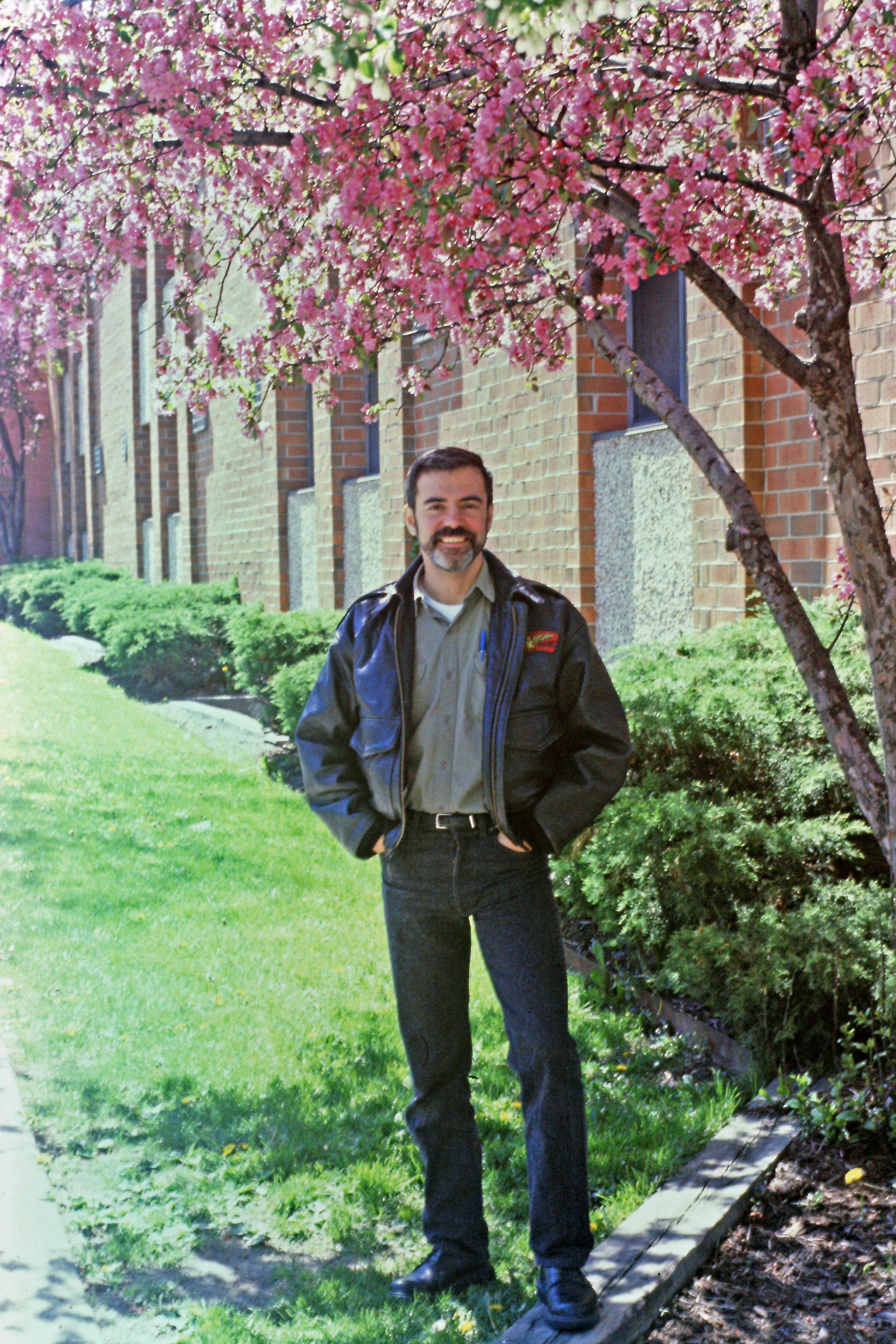
- Allan Bérubé in 1990
- Born: Allan Ronald Bérubé; December 3, 1946; Springfield, Massachusetts
- Died: December 11, 2007 (aged 61); Liberty, New York
- Occupations: Historian, activist, author
- Notable work: Coming Out Under Fire
- Partner: John Nelson
- Awards: Lambda Literary Award; MacArthur Fellowship

Allan Bérubé (pronounced BEH-ruh-bay; December 3, 1946 – December 11, 2007) was a gay American historian, activist, independent scholar, self-described "community-based" researcher and college drop-out, and award-winning author, best known for his research and writing about homosexual members of the American Armed Forces during World War II. He also wrote essays about the intersection of class and race in gay culture, and about growing up in a poor, working-class family, his French-Canadian roots, and about his experience of anti-AIDS activism.

Bérubé's principal work of history was the 1990 book Coming Out Under Fire, which examined the lives of gay men and women in the U.S. military between 1941 and 1945. It won the Lambda Literary Award for outstanding Gay Men's Nonfiction Book of 1990 and was adapted as a documentary film of the same name in 1994 with a screenplay that Bérubé co-wrote. The film received a Peabody Award for excellence in documentary media in 1995.

Bérubé received a MacArthur Fellowship in 1996. He received a Rockefeller grant from the Center for Lesbian and Gay Studies in 1994. For about twenty years beginning in 1979, Bérubé was interviewed about his work in publications including Time, The New York Times, The Washington Post, The Advocate, Christopher Street, Gay Community News, and the San Francisco Examiner. His many radio and television appearances included interviews by Studs Terkel, Sonia Freedman on CNN, and two by Terry Gross on National Public Radio's Fresh Air.

== Biography ==
Allan Ronald Bérubé was born in Springfield, Massachusetts, on December 3, 1946, the eldest of four children born to a rural, working-class, French Canadian family. For a time in his childhood his family lived in trailer parks in Connecticut and New Jersey, while his father worked as a poorly paid cameraman for NBC. While he was a teenager, the family returned to his grandparents' farming community in Massachusetts. For his last year of high school he attended the Mount Hermon School for Boys in Mount Hermon, Massachusetts, on scholarship, graduating in 1964. After registering for the draft as required at age 18, he sought and received conscientious objector status.

He was an English literature major at the University of Chicago from 1964 to 1968, but did not earn a degree, (Note: The University of Chicago Magazine labels Bérubé "X'68", indicating he attended the Extension School there.) dropping out in what he later described as a panic based on the political turmoil of 1968, confronting his sexuality, anxiety about paying for his education, and guilt about breaking with his working-class background. He moved to Boston and there he became involved in politics for the first time, working with the American Friends Service Committee in opposition to the Vietnam War. He came out as gay in 1969.

He moved to San Francisco in 1974 and continued to support himself with odd jobs, working for a time as a ticket-taker at the Castro Theatre. By 1979 he had launched what become his lifelong lecture and slideshow tour, presenting his latest research to audiences of lesbians and gay men, beginning with "Lesbian Masquerade" about women who dressed as men. When closing the city's bathhouses became a political controversy early in the AIDS epidemic, he published "a still-definitive essay on the history and social function of gay baths".

He was a co-founder of the San Francisco Lesbian and Gay History Project in 1978 and of the GLBT Historical Society there in 1985.

He worked as a consultant on the documentary film The Times of Harvey Milk.

He served from 1983 to 1986 as a member of the Lesbian and Gay Advisory Committee (now the Lesbian, Gay, Bisexual, Transgender, Queer, and Intersex Advisory Committee) of San Francisco. (Note: Members are appointed by the chair of the San Francisco Human Rights Commission.)

In the late 1980s, Bérubé belonged to the Forget-Me-Nots, an affinity group that performed civil disobedience at the United States Supreme Court during the 1987 Second National March on Washington for Lesbian and Gay Rights.

In 1990, he published Coming Out Under Fire: The History of Gay Men and Women in World War II, which examined the stories of gay men and women in the U.S. military between 1941 and 1945. The book used interviews with gay veterans, government documents, and other sources to discuss the social and political issues that faced over 9,000 servicemen and women during World War II. The work had its origins in a chance discovery. In the 1970s, a friend of one of Bérubé's neighbors discovered a batch of letters that a dozen gay military personnel had exchanged during World War II after meeting at a military base in Missouri. Bérubé turned them into the basis of years of research and a prize-winning book, after presenting his work in progress "Marching to a Different Drummer" at more than a hundred venues. Coming Out Under Fire won the Lambda Literary Award for outstanding Gay Men's Nonfiction book of 1990 Professional historians praised its research and the quality of Bérubé's prose. Martin Duberman called it:

...superb ... not only in terms of his prose style, which was absolutely lucid and even elegant, but also in terms of the very fine-spun analysis. Allan was not one to create shallow generalizations about either a given individual or a series of events. He was utterly meticulous and utterly careful. No one will ever, I think, have to redo the book on World War II.

Bérubé in later years liked to recall that Doris Kearns Goodwin called the book "remarkably evenhanded", as if it were surprising he could be committed to both scholarship and political activism.

It was adapted as a film in 1994, narrated by Salome Jens and Max Cole, with a screenplay by Bérubé and the film's director, Arthur Dong. The film received a Peabody Award for excellence in documentary media in 1995.

Because he was gay, he was not allowed to testify before the Senate Armed Services Committee when it held hearings on the exclusion of homosexuals from the U.S. military in 1993. He provided Senator Edward Kennedy with questions to pose at those hearings and submitted as written testimony a paper titled "Historical Overview of the Origins of the Military's Ban on Homosexuals".

In the documentary film Over Our Dead Bodies (1991) by video artist Stuart Marshall, he is interviewed along with Michael Callen and others on the development of AIDS activism. He held several teaching positions in the 1990s. He taught at Stanford University in Fall 1991, the University of California, Santa Cruz in Winter 1991 and Spring 1992, Portland State University in Summer Session 1994, and the New School for Social Research in Fall 1996.

Bérubé received a MacArthur Fellowship in 1996. He received a Rockefeller grant from the Center for Lesbian and Gay Studies in 1994 to research a book on the Marine Cooks and Stewards Union, (Note: About 1998, it was described as: "Dream Ships Sail Away: A Gay Odyssey Through the Golden Age of Luxury Liners, a narrative history about how cooks and stewards who worked on passenger liners created one of the most democratic, multiracial, and pro-gay unions in the United States.) which was left unfinished when he died. As part of his research, he created No Red-Baiting! No Race-Baiting! No Queen-Baiting!, a 90-minute illustrated talk on the left-wing, multi-racial, and gay-friendly union.

In the 1990s he also shared his expertise on gay life with the creators of several documentaries, including: The Question of Equality (1994), a documentary television series of four one-hour films funded by Independent Television Service; Out At Work (1996), a documentary film by Tami Gold; Licensed to Kill (1995), a documentary film by Arthur Dong; and The Castro (1997), a documentary film produced by KQED San Francisco.

Bérubé curated the U.S. section of "Goodbye to Berlin? Hundert Jahre Schwulenbewegung", an exhibition on the history of the gay rights movement presented at the Berlin Academy of the Arts in 1997.

He moved briefly to New York City and then settled in Liberty, New York. There he bought property he hoped to use for green development. He was manager and program director of the Liberty Theatre in 2002–2003. He bought, renovated, operated Carrier House Bed and Breakfast from 2002 to 2007. He served as coordinator of Community & Economic Development and founding member of Liberty Economic Action Project (LEAP) in 2004–05. With Maurice Gerry, he bought the Shelburne Playhouse/Theatre in Ferndale, New York, and between 2002 and 2007 he coordinated its restoration, won it listings on the New York State and National Historic Places registers, and had the facade restored by a team of Cornell University historic preservation volunteers. With his life partner John Nelson, he operated Intelligent Design Antiques, which sold mid-century modern designs in Liberty.

Bérubé was elected trustee of the Village of Liberty, New York, in 2003 and re-elected in 2005. He also played a major role in saving the historic Munson Diner, which was moved to Liberty from Manhattan in 2005.

Bérubé died on December 11, 2007, from complications of stomach ulcers in Catskill Regional Medical Center after being hospitalized for a day.

He was a member of the National Writers Union.

=== Papers and archives ===
Bérubé donated the research materials related to what he called the "World War II Project" to the GLBT Historical Society in 1995 and 2000. The executors of his estate donated his surviving papers to the same archive, which holds other collections that include correspondence from Bérubé and materials that document his work, as do the papers of Jonathan Ned Katz held by the New York Public Library.

== Selected works ==
Books

- Coming Out Under Fire: The History of Gay Men and Women in World War Two. NY: Free Press, April 1990; paperback reprint: Plume/New American Library, April 1991.

Essay collection

- My Desire for History: Essays in Gay, Community, and Labor History, Chapel Hill: UNC Press, 2011. John D'Emilio and Estelle Freedman, editors. Published posthumously.

Other essays

- "Don't Save Us From Our Sexuality". Coming Up!. April 1984.
- "The First Stonewall". San Francisco Lesbian & Gay Freedom Day Program, June 1983.
- Introduction to the German silent film, Anders als die Andern (1919), San Francisco premiere at the Seventh San Francisco International Lesbian and Gay Film Festival, June 20, 1983.
- "Medical Scapegoating: An Historical Perspective". Gay Community News, April 21, 1984.
- "Murder in the Women's Army Corps: An Interview with Actress Pat Bond". Out/Look (San Francisco), Issue 13, Summer 1991, p. 17-20.
- "The War Years Were Critical". Washington Blade Pride Guide, June 1983.
- "To Acknowledge Every Person As A Person". One-page anti-war essay in: Living at War: A Collection of Contemporary Responses to the Draft. Edited by Bérubé and David Worstell. Chicago: no publisher, no date (before November 1968). (Note: A book dealer described this collection: "LIVING AT WAR. A Collection of Contemporary Responses to the Draft. (n.p.): (n.p.) (n.d.). Spiralbound collection, apparently done in 1968 by students at the University of Chicago, containing personal statements by soldiers, draft evaders, and others; also includes poetry and drawings. Several pages appear to be missing from this very scarce and revealing period piece. Not least interesting among the letters reproduced is a somewhat sympathetic letter from a draft board, to an individual who had indicated his resistance to the draft and the war by returning his draft card.")

== Awards ==
- 1984: Certificate of Honor, San Francisco Board of Supervisors, "in appreciative public recognition of distinction and merit," 1984. (Note: The certificate reads: "We congratulate you for your extensive historical research and study of the gay community, held in high esteem and greatly valued throughout the country. This outstanding contribution to our society, focusing attention on the gay community during and after World War II, is a significant piece of history and we are grateful for your dedication to this effort.")
- 1990: Community Service Award, Bay Area Physicians for Human Rights
- 1991: Lambda Book Award for Best Gay Male Nonfiction Book of 1990
- 1991: Outstanding Book Award, Gustavus Myers Center for the Study of Human Rights in the United States: for the best scholarship on the subject of intolerance in the United States
- 1992: Certificate of Appreciation, National Park Service, Western Region
- 1994–95: Rockefeller Residency Fellowship in the Humanities, Center for Lesbian and Gay Studies (CLAGS), Graduate Center, City University of New York, in support of research on "The Marine Cooks and Stewards Union 1930s to 1950s"
- 1996: "Allan Berube Day," proclaimed by San Francisco Board of Supervisors, June 17, 1996
- 1996: MacArthur Fellowship, John D. and Catherine T. MacArthur Foundation, "in recognition of your accomplishments in history which demonstrate your originality, creativity, capacity for self-direction, and ability to make a contribution to our lives"
- 2001: Distinguished Achievement Award, Monette-Horwitz Trust Award
- 2004: Beautification Award, Greater Liberty Chamber of Commerce
- 2005: Pride of Sullivan Award, Sullivan County Chamber of Commerce and Industry, for Carrier House Bed & Breakfast, May 1, 2005.
