= Robertsonville =

Robertsonville may refer to:

- a former name of White Sulphur Springs, New York
- a former village that is now part of Thetford Mines, Quebec, Canada
