= The Woks of Life =

American Chinese culinary blog

- Founded: 2013
- Headquarters: New Jersey, USA
- Creators: Sarah, Kaitlin, Judy and Bill Leung
- Industry: Culinary
- Website: https://thewoksoflife.com/

The Woks of Life is a culinary blog focusing on Chinese and American Chinese cuisines. It was started in 2013 by Sarah, Kaitlin, Judy and Bill Leung.

== Blog ==
The blog covers traditional Chinese cuisines and Americanized Chinese dishes. Sarah and Kaitlin started it in 2013, after Judy and Bill had relocated from New Jersey to Beijing for Bill's job at Nokia, as a way to maintain a connection with their parents. The family had always had an interest in food and cooking, and Sarah and Kaitlin wanted to learn their parents' recipes so they could recreate them in their own kitchen.

Around a year after starting the blog, one of the recipe posts went viral, and the family began focusing on the blog as a way to reach a broader audience. By 2019 Sarah was working on the blog full-time. As of 2022 it receives about 7 million page view per month. According to Dwell it is "possibly the internet's most popular English-language Chinese food blog". According to Bon Appetit, "the family-run recipes blog has been considered by many fans to be the Bible of Chinese home cooking."

The family purchased a 1785 farmhouse on twelve acres of land in New Jersey where they work on the blog full-time and grow produce for use in their recipes.

== Cookbook ==
The family wrote a cookbook, The Woks Of Life: Recipes To Know And Love From A Chinese American Family, which was published in 2022 by Clarkson Potter. Sarah and Kaitlin created the photographs. The book became a New York Times bestseller. It was nominated for a 2023 James Beard Award in the U.S. Foodways category, as well as a 2023 IACP Award in the American category. It was named one of the best cookbooks of the year by the San Francisco Chronicle, Simply Recipes, The New York Times, Food & Wine, NPR, Smithsonian Magazine, Delish, and Epicurious.

== YouTube ==
The Leung Family also has a YouTube channel featuring cooking tutorials and lifestyle videos, with each family member presenting their own recipes.

== Recognition ==
In 2015, Saveur named it the Best Special Interest blog. The Woks of Life was featured in Season 4 Episode 6 of Lucky Chow (PBS) in 2020 and Season 1 Episode 5 of Family Dinner with Andrew Zimmern (Magnolia Network) in 2021.

== The Leung family ==
Judy Leung was born in Shanghai, grew up in Hubei and Shanghai, and immigrated to the US with her family when she was sixteen. She speaks Shanghainese, Cantonese, and Mandarin. Bill was born and raised in Liberty, New York, in the Catskill Mountains, where he worked summers local hotels and resorts with his stepfather, a professional chef. Sarah and Kaitlin Leung were born and raised in New Jersey.
