= Jennie Grossinger =

American businesswoman and philanthropist (1892–1972)

- Born: June 16, 1892; Baligrod, Austrian Galicia
- Died: 20 November 1972 (aged 80); Liberty, New York, US
- Citizenship: American
- Occupation: Businesswoman
- Spouse: Harry Grossinger (m. 1912)
- Children: 3

Jennie Grossinger (June 16, 1892 – November 20, 1972) was a Jewish Polish-Austrian-American hotel executive and philanthropist. She was the hostess of one of the largest Borscht Belt resorts, Grossinger's Catskill Resort Hotel. Beginning from the 1930s, she started to give up many of her business responsibilities, and started to devote herself to philanthropic causes. In her life, she had received several honors and awards for her philanthropic and social services. Her life was immortalized by her generosity to the people who made her hotel great, the townies. In July 2025, executive producers and co-creators Harris Salomon and Alan Zweibel announced they were bringing a scripted TV series about the resort and Jennie Grossinger to American television.

== Life ==
=== Early life ===
Jennie Grossinger was born into a poor Jewish family on June 16, 1892, in Baligrod, a small village in Galicia, Austria, now a part of Poland. She was the eldest daughter of three children of Malka Grossinger; née Grumet, and her husband, Asher Selig, who was an estate overseer. Her family migrated to the US in 1900. She had gone to a state-funded school in New York City; however at age 13, she stopped attending school when she started working as a buttonhole creator. Her brother was profoundly deaf; hence her mother went back to Europe to find relevant medical help for him.

=== Career ===
Jennie Grossinger continued to work 11 hours a day and attend night school. while also helping her father and sister and sending money to her mother back in Europe. In 1912, she wedded Harry Grossinger, her cousin, who was the production man in a clothing factory. She then went to work as a cashier in her family's new business enterprise, a small restaurant. In 1914, the restaurant business was abandoned due to her father's mental and physical breakdown.

Grossinger's indoor pool in 1976

At that point, the family moved to an overview farmhouse in the Catskill Mountains, where they expected to earn enough to pay the bills by developing harvests, which ultimately fizzled after a couple of months. From that point forward, they started to take in summer guests, the vast majority of whom were individual Jewish workers searching for inexpensive excursions. Thus a small hotel emerged named Longbrook House, where Jennie Grossinger worked as the bookkeeper, chambermaid, and host, while her mother oversaw the kosher kitchen. Her husband continued to live and work in New York City, but assisted the business with marketing and also provided guests from his acquaintance. In 1914, during their first summer season, they facilitated nine guests who paid a total of $81. In the next year, they renovated the hotel by adding six rooms and building a new wing, providing for 20 guests.

The hotel soon became well known for its food and reasonable rates. Harry Grossinger left his place of employment in New York City and joined the inn business in 1916. The family sold their previous farmhouse and purchased a larger property nearby in 1919. The new property had a bigger and better-prepared lodging building. Subsequently, they purchased 63 acres of land of woods and a lake, providing the guests with fishing and various sporting facilities. Over the next decade, their inn business gradually expanded, and by 1929 it had a guest limit of 500. That year, they hired musician Milton Blackstone to promote their business. He recommended offering a free vacation to couples who met at the resort, which they did. He also concocted the motto "Grossinger's has everything."

After the end of World War II, Grossinger continued directing the development of the hotel and expanded its client base. In 1948, guests who were not Orthodox Jews began to get special provisions on the Jewish Sabbath. In 1964, Harry Grossinger died. Following his death, Jennie Grossinger handed over the business to her children, who were already involved in the management.

The hotel stayed a family-run business until 1986, when it was offered to Servico, Inc. They leveled the old inn structures to clear a path for additional up-to-date offices and facilities, with a spa, a connoisseur lounge area, and an 8,000-square-foot sporting lounge aimed at younger customers.

=== Philanthropy ===
From the 1930s, Grossinger started to assign a considerable lot of her previous business-related obligations and began to commit herself to humanitarian activities. Much of her charity works were for Jewish and non-sectarian causes. She focused on doing charity activities in the Jewish homeland of Israel. There she helped with building a medical center and a convalescent home. Out of her sheer interest in education, The Hebrew University of Jerusalem benefited from her charity. She donated money to help mentally disabled children in several children's hospitals and care facilities. She also donated money to fight tuberculosis, and for the proper medication of arthritic patients.

=== Personal life ===
In 1913, Jennie and Harry Grossinger had their first child, who died in infancy. Later they had another child, Paul. In 1927, they had a daughter, Elaine. Jennie Grossinger was plagued by ill-health throughout her life. She used to suffer from chronic high blood pressure, severe headaches, back problems, and depression. In 1941, and 1946, she underwent major surgeries.

=== Death ===
Grossinger died at her home on the grounds of her family's resort of a stroke on November 20, 1972. She was 80 years old. Her burial was held at Congregation Ahavath Cemetery in Loch Sheldrake, New York. She had handed the business over to her children back in 1964, and who had for quite some time been associated with its administration.

== Awards and honors ==
In her lifetime, Grossinger had received several honors and awards including honorary degrees from New England College, and Wilberforce University in Ohio for her philanthropic works.

== In popular culture ==
=== Stage ===
- In 2005, Barbara Minkus played the role of Jennie Grossinger in the stage production of Saturday Night at Grossinger's in Los Angeles, and she reprised her performance in Wilton Manors, Florida in 2006.

=== TV ===
- This Is Your Life, season 3, episode 14 (1954)

=== Literature ===
- Grossinger, Jennie (1958) "The Art of Jewish Cooking". Introduction by Paul Grossinger. New York: Random House
- Grossinger, Richard (Chosen name, not related to the Grossingers) (1997). Out of Babylon: Ghosts of Grossinger's. Frog, Limited. ISBN 978-1-883319-57-1.
- Grossinger, Tania (2008-06-17). Growing Up at Grossinger's. Skyhorse Publishing Inc. ISBN 978-1-60239-205-2.
- Drachman, Virginia G. (2002). Enterprising Women: 250 Years of American Business. UNC Press Books. ISBN 978-0-8078-5429-7.
- Neidle, Cecyle S. (1975). America's Immigrant Women. Twayne Publishers. ISBN 978-0-8057-8400-8.
- Goldstein, Samantha Hope (2000). "Don't Mind Me, I'll Just Sit Here in the Dark": Illuminating the Role of Women in Catskills Performative Culture. University of California, San Diego.

== Bibliography ==
- Candee, Marjorie Dent (1956). Current biography yearbook, 1956. New York: H.W. Wilson. OCLC 59658453.
- Sicherman, Barbara; Green, Carol Hurd (1980). Notable American Women: The Modern Period : a Biographical Dictionary. Harvard University Press. ISBN 978-0-674-62733-8.
- Pomerantz, Joel (1970). Jennie and the Story of Grossinger's. Grosset & Dunlap. ASIN B0026B3KAI.
- Encyclopedia of World Biography: 20th Century Supplement. J. Heraty. 1987. ISBN 978-0-910081-02-3.
- Encyclopaedia Judaica. Encyclopaedia Judaica. 1996. ISBN 978-965-07-0219-9.
- Brawarsky, Sandee; Mark, Deborah (1998). Two Jews, Three Opinions: A Collection of Twentieth-century American Jewish Quotations. Perigee Books. ISBN 978-0-399-52449-3.

== Additional references ==
- "Grossinger, Jennie (1892–1972) ." Women in World History: A Biographical Encyclopedia. Retrieved April 17, 2021 from Encyclopedia.com
- Kanfer, Stefan. "NY: Bulldozers Have the Last Laugh," in Time. October 27, 1986.
- Shepard, Richard F. (1972-11-21). "Jennie Grossinger Dies at Resort Home". The New York Times. ISSN 0362-4331. Retrieved 2021-05-29
- The New York Times Book Review. New York Times Company. 1976.
- "Jennie Grossinger Day!". Jewish Women's Archive. Retrieved 2021-05-29.
