= The Curse of Quon Gwon =

1910s film by Marion E. Wong

The Curse of Quon Gwon: When the Far East Mingles with the West
- Directed by: Marion E. Wong
- Written by: Marion E. Wong
- Produced by: Marion E. Wong
- Starring: Violet Wong; Harvey Soohoo
- Production company: Mandarin Film Company
- Country: United States
- Language: Silent (English intertitles)

The Curse of Quon Gwon: When the Far East Mingles with the West is a black-and-white silent film. Filmed c. 1916 or 1917, it was never released and long thought lost. Two reels of an estimated total of seven or eight survived and were restored, rendering the film incomplete.

== Background ==
Marion E. Wong created the Mandarin Film Company in Oakland, California and served as its president. In an interview with the Oakland Tribune in 1916, she expressed her interest in presenting Chinese culture to American audiences through film. She produced, directed and wrote the screenplay for The Curse of Quon Gwon, the only film her company made. The film tells a love story featuring Wong's sister-in-law, Violet Wong, as the female lead, and Wong herself as the film's villain. Other members of Wong's family also had roles in the film. According to Violet Wong's grandson, Gregory Mark, the film was turned down for distribution.

== Restoration process ==
In 1969, Violet Wong told her grandson Gregory Mark about a film canister in the basement of the family home and said: "You do something with it." Mark turned it into 16mm, and a few years later, Violet showed the film to her family. In 2004, filmmaker Arthur Dong learned of two nitrate reels and the 16mm print containing footage from The Curse of Quon Gwon that were in the possession of Violet Wong's descendants while researching his documentary film Hollywood Chinese. He was given access to the footage and took it the Academy Film Archive, which restored the film in 2005. As of 2007, it is the earliest known Chinese American feature film and it is also one of the earliest films directed by a woman, Marion E. Wong. Most of the film remains missing.

== Recognitions ==
In December 2006, the film was recognized as culturally, historically and aesthetically significant, and selected for preservation in the National Film Registry by Library of Congress.
