= Luigi's Restaurant shooting =

Shooting in Fayetteville, North Carolina

- Location: 35.0769°N 78.9539°W; Fayetteville, North Carolina, U.S.
- Date: August 6, 1993 (UTC−04:00)
- Attack type: Mass shooting, mass murder, hate crime
- Weapons: Savage 67 12-gauge pump-action shotgun; 12-gauge shotgun; .22-caliber rifle
- Deaths: 4
- Injuries: 8 (including the perpetrator)
- Perpetrator: Kenneth Junior French
- Motive: Opposition to President Bill Clinton lifting the ban on homosexuals to serve in the military, as well as anger over the acceptance of women and black people into the military

On August 6, 1993, 22-year-old Fort Bragg soldier Kenneth Junior French, armed with two shotguns and a rifle, opened fire inside a Luigi's restaurant in Fayetteville, North Carolina, killing four people and injuring seven others. The case was featured in the 1997 documentary film Licensed to Kill.

== Shooting ==
At around 10 p.m., French drove to the restaurant in a black truck. Wearing shorts and a fishing vest, French exited the truck carrying a pump-action shotgun. French then entered the restaurant through the kitchen at the back of the building and then began to yell about politics and homosexuality before opening fire indiscriminately. He first shot the cook Willie McCormick, before Pete Parrous came over pleading for French not hurt anyone, as French shot Parrous in the face killing him. Pete’s wife Ethel screamed seeing French kill her husband, was soon shot in the face and was killed. Pete and Ethel’s daughter began screaming and was shot in the thigh. Wesley Cover pleaded with French not to hurt a pregnant woman, but was soon killed by him with the lady shot, but not fatally. James Kidd was covering his son under a table and was shot in the back by French killing him. His son was not harmed. In the aftermath, 4 people were killed and seven were injured. French was then shot and wounded by police lieutenant Bill Simons.

After the shooting, French remarked:

"I don't believe there's anywhere in our Constitution that gives anybody the right to be accepted by anybody else. When the Civil Rights Act was passed in 1964, people automatically assumed that they had a right to many different things. Women, blacks, now carrying into gays. They feel that they have a right to be accepted? Who—who do they need to accept them?"

== Victims ==
The victims that were killed were:

- Wesley Scot Cover, 26
- James F. Kidd, 46
- Pete Parrous, 73 (the restaurant owner)
- Ethel Parrous, 65 (Pete's wife)

== Perpetrator ==
Kenneth Junior French was a native of Zephyrhills, Florida and had been in the military since June 1, 1989, serving as a mechanic. He had been previously stationed at Fort Jackson, South Carolina and in Korea. He hadn’t received any special weapons training or had any negative reports on him. The police found that he hadn’t been in the restaurant or had any connection to any of the workers there.

== Trial ==
Sergeant Kenneth French was charged with four counts of capital murder, and a further eight counts of assault. French's defense attorney said French was drunk at the time of the shooting, and held life-long anger, saying French's father had raped a family member.

French was convicted for all four murders and eight assaults. The jury deadlocked on whether he should face the death penalty. French was sentenced to four consecutive life terms for the murders, with a further 35 years imprisonment for the assaults.
