= Licensed to Kill (1997 film) =

1997 film by Arthur Dong

- Directed by: Arthur Dong
- Written by: Arthur Dong
- Produced by: Arthur Dong; Thomas G. Miller
- Starring: Raymond Childs; William Cross; Corey Burley; Kenneth Jr. French; Jay Johnson; Jeffrey Swinford
- Narrated by: Arthur Dong
- Cinematography: Robert Shepard
- Edited by: Arthur Dong
- Music by: Miriam Cutler; Me'Shell Ndegeocello
- Distributed by: PBS; P.O.V. Deep Focus Films
- Release date: 1997
- Running time: 80 minutes
- Country: United States
- Language: English
- Budget: US $135,000

Licensed to Kill is a 1997 documentary written, directed, and produced by Arthur Dong, in which Dong, a gay man himself, interviews six inmates who committed murder for reasons related to homophobia.

It is the third film in a series of documentaries where Dong explores anti-gay prejudice, and was the only film at the 1997 Sundance Film Festival to win two awards, the Directing Award Documentary and the documentary Filmmaker's Trophy. It received Best Documentary at the 23rd Seattle International Film Festival.

Dong cited a near-miss in 1977 with homophobic violence as an impetus for the project; the teenagers whom he and his friend largely evaded attacked two priests, Jim Brown and Douglass McKinney, shortly afterward just outside of the Castro District, San Francisco.

In discussing the subject matter of the film, Dong specifically stated that the documentary covers "straight attitudes about homosexuality". He also said that he specifically did not present a single solution to the dilemmas highlighted in the film. The film is preserved in the Library of Congress, and was included in the curriculum of Concordia University's Fall 1999 "Film Studies: Representation and Sexuality" course.

== Synopsis ==
After researching some 200 cases where the motive for murder involved homosexuality, Dong contacted 25 murderers convicted for killing homosexuals or for the commission of what would become a Federal hate crime following the murder of Matthew Shepard, and received agreements from 15 to be interviewed on camera for the film. Dong included only six of the interviews he conducted in the final footage. For Dong to include them in the final product, the inmates had to meet two criteria specifically: admission of guilt, and admission of homophobia as a motive. Footage for the seventh murderer included in the documentary was compiled from videotapes of police interrogations.

=== Cases ===
Raymond Childs murdered 55-year-old Wall Street attorney David Schwartz of Cravath, Swaine & Moore on November 19, 1992. Childs stabbed Schwartz 27 times and cited a gay panic defense. Childs was paroled from Fishkill Correctional Facility on March 16, 2023. (Note: Inmate status can be checked online; Childs' DIN: 94A5062. Same synopsis text is found in History of violence against LGBT people in the United States§1990–1999)

Donald Aldrich and his friends Henry Earl Dunn and David McMillan went to Bergfield Park, a known gay hangout in Tyler, Texas on November 30, 1993. The three men kidnapped Nicholas West, drove him outside of town, and assaulted and battered him. They ordered him to strip to his underwear. Eventually, they began to shoot him: in his hand, nearly severing a finger; in both arms; in his torso with non-fatal wounds. West was shot a total of nine times, with the ninth being a fatal gunshot wound to his head, fired by Dunn. Both Dunn and Aldrich were sentenced to death. Dunn was executed in February 2003. Aldrich was executed via lethal injection on October 12, 2004, in Huntsville, Texas.

Corey Burley and two friends – allegedly Freddie Earl Thorton and Frederick Eugene Kirby, both of whom were charged in the incident as well – went to Reverchon Park on October 26, 1991. There they approached Thanh Nguyen, a Vietnamese immigrant, and his lover, Hugh Callaway. The three harassed and physically assaulted the pair, eating the food the couple had sat down to enjoy as they battered them. After approximately twenty minutes, the perpetrators robbed the couple before Burley shot Nguyen in the abdomen. Burley was sentenced to life in prison; however, he will become eligible for parole on October 31, 2026. He is serving his life sentence in McConnell as of June 18, 2024.

William Cross admitted to killing William T. Lemke, age 51. Lemke's body was found on the roof of the Wilson Avenue Men's Club on a weekend where 12 people were killed in Chicago. During the investigation, police determined Lemke died on April 9, 1994. He was sentenced to 25 years in the Dixon State Correctional Center of Illinois. On July 13, 2006, he was released on parole.

U.S. Army Sergeant Kenneth Junior French walked into Luigi's Restaurant in Fayetteville, North Carolina on August 6, 1993, and began firing indiscriminately. He murdered the owner, Peter Parrous, and his wife Ethel, as well as two patrons, Wesley Scott Cover and James F. Kidd. Seven others were wounded in the mass shooting. French stated that he was highly intoxicated at the time. Unlike the other murderers featured in the film, none of French's victims were thought to be homosexual; rather, his actions were out of anger toward then-President Bill Clinton for announcing his intent to lift the ban on homosexuals in the United States Military. As of June 20, 2024, French was incarcerated at Pender Correctional in North Carolina.

Jay Thomas Johnson went to Loring Park on July 31, 1991, and shot and killed Joel Larson. On August 10, 1991, he went to a known gay hangout on a beach in Minneapolis. He killed former Minnesota State Senator John Chenoweth and severely injured Cord Drazst. He confessed to his crimes and pleaded guilty. Unlike the other murderers in the film, he recognized he was in fact gay himself both before and after his committed murders. He was sentenced to two consecutive life sentences plus fifteen years, and is serving his time as an openly gay man with HIV. As of June 20, 2024, Johnson was incarcerated at Stillwater Correctional in Minnesota.

Jeffrey Alan Swinford, Ronnie Lee Birchett, and Bobby John Fox met Chris Miller in a public park before the quartet went to Miller's apartment in Little Rock, Arkansas to use cocaine. Swinford alleges that Miller made sexual overtures to all three men who had intended to rob him before getting high, targeting Miller because of his homosexuality. Fox and Swinford both pleaded guilty to first degree murder on August 1, 1995; Birchett's case was 'converted' because he was only 17 at the time. Fox served six years for the murder before being paroled; when he fled to east Texas in 2001, he used the name Brian Stucker. As of June 20, 2024, Fox was incarcerated at Williamsburg Federal Corrections Institute and not scheduled for release until November 21, 2027. (Note: Inmates in the custody of the Federal Bureau of Prisons can be searched using the online inmate locator. Fox's register number is 28670-009.) Asked about killing Miller in the documentary Licensed to Kill, Swinford said Miller's death meant there was "one less problem the world had to mess with". (Note: Same synopsis text is found in History of violence against LGBT people in the United States§1990–1999)

== Production ==
Included in the film are scenes from daily U.S. life showing the violence directed toward homosexuality, both specific – one neighbor attacking another; and in more general terms, such as the programs of Pat Robertson and Ralph Reed, to show the viewer how pervasive the invective towards gays had become at the time the film was made. Johnson specifically mentions Robertson's The 700 Club as influencing his decision to murder men he perceived to be gay. Additionally, Dong included anti-gay rap, television coverage of the AIDS epidemic, and speeches by politicians such as William Dannemeyer.

Dong originally had also wanted to include content regarding lesbian murders; however, none of the killers of lesbians he contacted were willing to be interviewed. While at one point footage of violence against lesbians had been edited for inclusion, Dong felt that to do so without the interviews to balance it would merely be "tokenism".

Initially, the film didn't include footage of the victims' corpses, and test audiences found themselves disturbed by their sympathetic responses to the killers. Dong stated that one of his goals with the documentary was to show that the men who committed the crimes included in the film could very easily be a next-door neighbor, but that after the test audience response, he needed balance to convey the intended message.

The film budget consisted of grants from various foundations totaling US$135,000, including a Rockefeller Foundation grant bestowed in 1995. It was presented on 16 mm film and took less than two years to produce. In June 1997, Dong stated that he intended to edit the 80-minute documentary to a 30-minute version that could be shown in high schools.

== Release ==
The film debuted at the 1997 Sundance Film Festival, where the original print was mangled and a replacement had to be flown in for the scheduled screening. Afterward, Dong handled distribution personally, scheduling the film for theaters in cities with a large number of murders where the victims were gay, and planning opening days for the anniversaries of those murders included in the film. It also played at other film festivals, such as the Berlin International Film Festival, the London Gay Film Festival, the 23rd Seattle International Film Festival, the 15th San Francisco International Asian American Film Festival March 6–13, the 1997 Asian American International Film Festival in New York, the 1997 Philadelphia International Gay & Lesbian Film Festival July 18–20, the 42nd Valladolid International Film Festival, October 24 - November 1, 1997 and at the 1997 Hawaii International Film Festival on November 15, 1997, alongside Dong's other works Forbidden City, USA (November 16) and Coming Out Under Fire (November 17).

Johnson got his own screening of the film, which Dong recorded and discussed at an April 17, 1998 screening in Minneapolis. Johnson praised the film for pointing out the ignorance prevalent in U.S. society, and for its accuracy. Johnson criticized the fact that he appears "emotionally distant" in the film, but admitted to having affected that facade intentionally. Johnson also commented on the similarities between the fact that the crimes portrayed in the film are committed in darkness and society's judgments that force gay people to hide.

A one-hour version of the film debuted on PBS June 23, 1998 as part of its POV series. According to the Blade's contact at the Georgia Voice, in June 1998 Georgia Public Television only aired one of the LGBT programs scheduled for PBS channels nationwide: Licensed to Kill. Seventeen minutes of the follow-up with Johnson is included in the 2007 PBS POV DVD boxed set release, along with interviews of Frank Chester, David Feikema, and Frederick Kirby.

Licensed to Kill has occasionally been screened following anti-gay hate crimes. Following the brutal beating of Matthew Shepard, a screening of the PBS version was held in the Natrona County Courthouse in Casper, Wyoming, just hours prior to Shepard's death. The Academy Museum of Motion Pictures held a public screening of the documentary at the Ted Mann Theater on December 14, 2021, a week after the murder of Nikai David in Oakland, California.

The UCLA Legacy Project handled film restoration for the June 25, 2024, Blu-ray release.

== Reviews ==
The film received mostly positive critical reviews, for both theater and television releases, even from reviewers who took exception to the inclusion of excerpts from religious programming.

=== Theatrical screenings ===
Barbara Shulgasser for the San Francisco Examiner was disturbed by the effect of the seven murderers. She commented on how the majority of the perpetrators seem to be uneducated, yet Johnson has a smooth logic that led her to define the common trait among the killers as "psychopathology". She ends her review pointing out that French offers up an excuse as though equating murder to freedom of speech. She rated the film 2.5 out of 4 stars. Janet Maslin of The New York Times commented on the fact that the documentary doesn't focus on obvious answers. Maslin also noted that Dong's patient methods in questioning the murderers helps highlight the need to question each killer's reasoning for his actions. The Advocate's Mark Huisman pointed out the lack of hyperbole in the film and noted specifically the danger of an idea of one group having superiority over another permeating a society.

Sean P. Means, writing for The Salt Lake Tribune, gave the film a full four stars, and made certain to mention that the common thread in each instance isn't the sexuality of the victim, but rather the murderer's feelings towards what they perceive to be homosexuality. Means also noted how the film includes the daily hatred pervading U.S. culture among the vitriol so calmly provided by the killers, making the film a "beacon that slices the darkness". Means is especially impressed with how Swindle's interview illustrates the ineffectiveness of the law alone where equality and tolerance are concerned. Deborah Peterson for the St. Louis Post-Dispatch mentioned Dong's "restrained" presentation as well, noting it as an effective method of relaying the casual indifference with which the killers apparently view their crimes. A syndicated Associated Press column printed in the Greensboro News & Record acknowledged that the minimal narration Dong provides in the film forces the viewer to develop their own opinions.

Joe Baltake, writing for The Sacramento Bee and rating the film at 3.5 out of 4 stars, echoed Means' opinion regarding the way "gay-bashing" has been woven into U.S. culture. He specifically pointed out an episode of a talk show that had recently aired in which an audience member made the oft-repeated claim regarding homosexuals 'choosing' to be gay before proceeding to enumerate several reasons such a claim is erroneous. Baltake praised the detachment Dong uses in presenting the murderers' reasons, noting how it unsettled him as a viewer. Baltake found Dong's lack of verbal editorializing in the film to be most effective in examining the culture and politics that led to the murderers' belief in the acceptability of their actions. Renée Graham of The Boston Globe was impressed that Dong did not use the documentary to "launch a diatribe" and instead allowed the interviews to stand on their own without editorializing. Terry Lawson of the Detroit Free Press, who gave the film three of four stars, acknowledges the lack of verbal editorializing from Dong, but points out that the excerpts included from sermons given by Pat Robertson, Jerry Falwell, and Robert Schuller - among others - focus on "inflammatory anti-gay remarks" that would likely be considered hate speech if made in a less specialized forum. Lawson also notes that the film makes viewers consider the possibility that their own actions or lack thereof impact the level of violence impacting the gay community.

Leslie Rubinowski of the Pittsburgh Post-Gazette rated the documentary 3.5 out of 4 stars. Rubinowski stated that Dong's juxtaposition of pictures, footage, and interviews is both "stunning" and "nightmarish", and that while the film is "terrifying", everyone should see it. Gary C.W. Chun, for The Honolulu Advertiser, echoed other reviewers in noting how the film lets the murderers tell the stories of their crimes. Chun also provides several quotes from Dong with respect to what he wanted to achieve: telling the stories "accurately" and "humanizing" the perpetrators of these crimes. Nick Charles of the New York Daily News gave the film 3.5 out of 4 stars and stated that despite the inclusion of fundamentalist Christian sermon segments, the film doesn't come across as "heavy-handed". Charles points out that there is a definite connection between the beliefs espoused in those segments and the beliefs of the killers.

Todd Lothery, writing for The News & Observer, gave the film 3.5 out of 4 stars, stating that the conclusion he drew from the film was that the hate crimes these men committed "are an inevitability in a society that continues to preach intolerance." Desmond Ryan of The Philadelphia Inquirer also rated the film 3.5 out of 4 stars and marveled at the balanced and "detached" handling of the murders. Ryan also pointed out that Dong's approach involved persuasion for the murderers to discuss their crimes rather than demanding answers, and that as a result Dong was able to show the "many guises" of hatred among the different killers. L. Kent Wolgamott for the Lincoln Journal Star also gave the film 3.5 out of 4 stars and noted that Dong's use of real crime scene photos serves as a reminder that real murder differs significantly from Hollywood's depictions of it. While largely appreciative of Dong's editing style throughout the film, Wolgamott does call the use of footage from fundamentalist Christian programming "a cheap shot", a stance echoed by the Deseret News' Jeff Vice, though Vice was otherwise impressed with the film overall.

Conversely, Stuart Klawans of The Nation commented that the murderers all "rat[ted] out God as their accomplice" and ended his review by pointing out the progressive irony in Aldrich's fate in particular, who chose his victim specifically out of his understanding that Texas police would look the other way only to be sentenced to death under a hate crime law because of how he chose his victim. Richard von Busack of MetroActive pointed out that the inclusion of Falwell, Robertson, Lou Sheldon, Reed, and Dannemeyer is to show "the theoreticians" and the danger of such unchecked rhetoric when others are willing to kill in practice of those ideologies. The Bay Area Reporter's Gary Morris found the inclusion of the rhetoric from Falwell and Robertson entirely apropros, pointing out that "the devaluation of gay lives" is one of the major themes of the documentary.

Ernest Hardy for LA Weekly calls the murderers monsters while praising Dong's choices not to have a "prodding" narration or "histrionic" score to allow the perpetrators to "humanize themselves". Hardy was also impressed with Dong's use of a comment Aldrich made in his interview equating homosexuals with pedophiles when speaking to Cross as both Aldrich and Cross stated they were sexually assaulted as young boys. Cross refutes the idea that being gay makes someone a child predator. Variety's Emanuel Levy, while impressed with the film, stated that it might be too tough to watch in a movie theater. He did state that it should be aired via PBS and shown in schools. Levy also commented that the lack of editorializing detracted from the presentation in his opinion as it allowed the subject matter to become impersonal. Levy rated the film B+. Russell Smith of The Austin Chronicle gave the film a rating of 3.5 out of 5 stars and called the film "rigorously unsentimental". Smith noted that Dong understood the concept of being tired out by outrage, and even approved of the way that Dong demonstrated the humanity of the killers rather than depicting them as monstrous. Andy Klein, writing for Houston Press, was pleased with the questions raised by the film, specifically the role of religion in "forming reactionary social attitudes".

The Los Angeles Times' Kenneth Turan felt that Dong had conveyed the humanity of the killers well, forcing audiences to face the complex nature of these men and their actions in the broader context of society. Turan pointed out that Dong specifically avoids perpetuating the cliches Hollywood typically showcases when depicting bigotry. Writing for The Progressive, Bob Blanchard noted that what Dong shows in the film is a United States with a level of hatred so ingrained that it is "the template rather than the exception", and taught as a matter of course to be passed on to the next generation. David Noh of Film Journal International commented that Dong's use of silence allows viewers to reflect on what the killers have revealed even while watching the murderers reflect on their own actions. He also called it both "vitally important" and "deeply unsettling".

Writing for The Motion Picture Guide, 1998 edition, Eric Monder rated it four stars and noted it is an examination of "social influences and individual responsibility". Monder was impressed by Dong's ability to show each killer's motivations without making the murderers into martyrs. Monder does comment on the lack of coverage regarding lesbian murders as a detractor, but otherwise notes that it is an honest look into "society's casual networks". The Boston Phoenix's Gerald Peary notes that the lesson from watching Licensed to Kill is that the motives don't fit a stereotype. Peary also pointed out that French's crime in particular is demonstrable proof that being gay isn't a necessity in becoming a "gay-bashing statistic". Cara Mertes of the Independent Film & Video Monthly also comments that the film benefits from Dong's usage of simple techniques, specifically naming silences, the "non-nonsense" direction, and the effective soundtrack.

=== Television broadcast ===
Walter Goodman of The New York Times pointed out that the answers provided by the inmates might be dishonest, and that they are filled with excuses ranging from being a previous victim of pedophilia themselves to a reliance on religion. Goodman praised Dong's use of both newsreel and police videos in showing the brutality each murderer describes so prosaically. Lynn Elber, writing for the Associated Press, commented that while the crimes themselves were disturbing, Elber found the idea that the documentary and the depicted crimes might be "received coolly and without compassion" just as unnerving. Elber also points out that the PBS version of the film begins and ends with audio recordings from answering machines of lesbian and gay civil rights groups where the callers promised violence to lesbians and gays. The Washington Blade's Greg Varner mentioned specifically that the hour-long presentation made it clear that the hatred of homosexuals is, at the very least, sanctioned - "if not directly inspired" - by leaders in both religion and politics.

== Audience reaction ==
UC Davis research psychologist Gregory Herek stressed that the documentary helps define the motives of the murderers, pointing out that saying that all of the actions were taken due to the perpetrator's fear of their own homosexuality is overly simplistic, and Dong himself commented that seeing the murderers as monsters is dangerous as such a perspective keeps us from addressing the underlying societal issues the documentary highlights.

When the film played in Berlin, viewers left during the screening, telling Dong they were simply too disturbed by the content. Discussion afterward was described as "long and heated".

== Accolades ==
Licensed to Kill and Dong himself received several nominations and garnered several awards. Unfortunately, due to a change in the Academy Awards qualifying rules, it was not eligible for an Oscar since a screening at a film festival no longer served to qualify a film and only films that had at least a one-week run in either Los Angeles County, California or the borough of Manhattan, New York were eligible for consideration.

=== Awards received ===
- Best Documentary Director Award, 1997 Sundance Film Festival, sponsored by the Directors Guild of America
- Documentary Filmmaker's Trophy, 1997 Sundance Film Festival
- Best Documentary, Golden Space Needle, 23rd Seattle International Film Festival, June 1997
- Audience Award for Best Documentary, 1997 Philadelphia International Gay and Lesbian Film Festival
- Asian American Media Award, 20th Asian American International Film Festival, July 17, 1997
- Berlin Film Festival, Official Selection, 1997

=== Nominations ===
- Best Director, News & Documentary Emmy, 1997
