= Grossinger's Resort =

Hotel in Liberty, New York

Grossinger's was a resort in the Catskill Mountains located in the town of Liberty, New York. It operated from the 1910s until 1986 and was part of the Borscht Belt, a region of Jewish resorts. The establishment was kosher and primarily served Jewish clientele from New York City.

Grossinger's in 1977

Under the direction of hostess Jennie Grossinger, the resort grew into one of the largest in the Borscht Belt. It inspired the setting of the 1987 film Dirty Dancing.

By 2018, most of the buildings on the property had been demolished, though a few remained until they were destroyed in a fire in 2022.

In June 2025, PPG Development purchased the property for $14.75 million, with plans to redevelop the site.

== History ==
Asher Selig Grossinger and his wife, Malka Grumet Grossinger, were both born in Baligrod, a village in Galicia, Poland, and immigrated to the United States in the 1890s. After several unsuccessful business ventures and declining health for Asher, the family moved from New York City to Ferndale in Sullivan County, New York, around 1913. There, they rented rooms to visitors from New York City. Malka Grossinger operated the kosher kitchen, and their daughter, Jennie Grossinger (1891–1972), served as hostess. The family initially called their home Longbrook House.

In 1919, the Grossingers sold Longbrook House and purchased a larger property of 100 acres (0.40 km^{2}), which they named Grossinger's Terrace Hill House.

Under Jennie Grossinger’s management, the resort expanded to over 35 buildings. The main building included a dining room seating 1,300 guests, with the “Terrace Room” nightclub located beneath it. The resort also had its own airstrip and post office. Boxer Rocky Marciano trained there during his career. Reports indicate that the family offered $1 million to rename the New York, Ontario and Western Railway station at Ferndale to "Grossingers," but the proposal was rejected by competing hoteliers.

In 1952, Grossinger’s became the first resort in the world to use artificial snow for skiing.

The indoor pool in 1976

Jennie Grossinger’s death in 1972 coincided with the decline of Borscht Belt resorts, which struggled to attract younger visitors.

In August 1984, the resort promoted a Woodstock weekend for the 15th anniversary of the 1969 festival. Events included tie-dye workshops, a performance by David Clayton-Thomas, a midnight screening of the documentary Woodstock, and an appearance by John Sebastian. Activist Abbie Hoffman also participated in the promotion.

In 1986, the Grossinger family descendants sold the property to Servico for $9 million. That same year, the resort’s main hotel and facilities closed. On September 1, 1986, Eddie Fisher attempted to demolish the playhouse with dynamite as a symbolic beginning for redevelopment, but the structure required additional demolition by bulldozer.

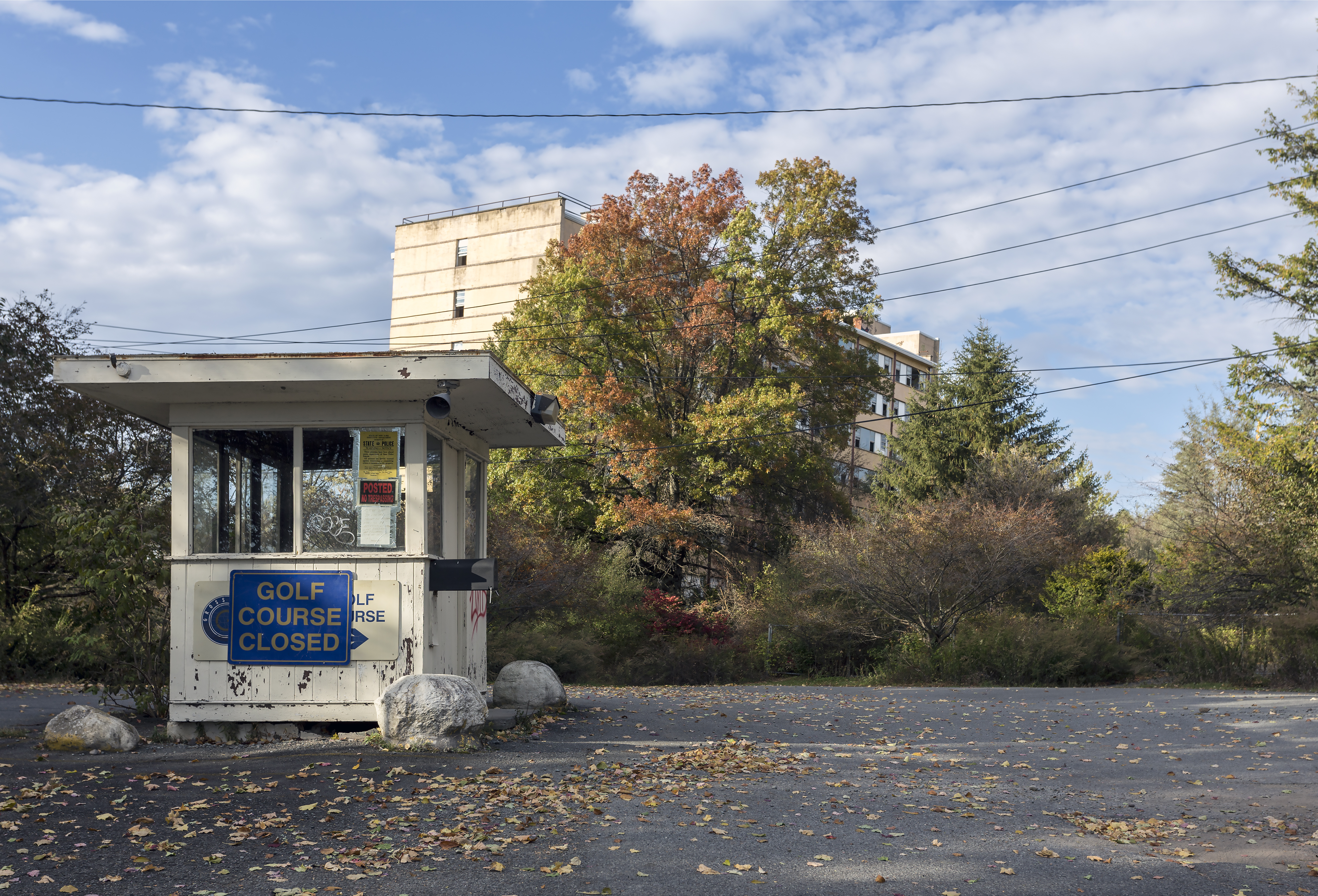
Grossinger's in 2015

The golf course remained open until 2017 and was known among local members as the "Big G". Its clubhouse was demolished in July 2018.

Servico and subsequent owners were unable to reopen the hotel due to high costs. As of September 2013, the property was owned by developer Louis Cappelli, who also held the nearby Concord Resort and sought to benefit from proposed casino development in the region.

Demolition of the resort’s remaining structures began in summer 2018, with the last building demolished on October 19, 2018. A separate building on the site was destroyed by fire on August 16, 2022.

In February 2019, it was reported that Sullivan Resorts LLC, a subsidiary of Cappelli Enterprises, intended to construct a $50 million resort with a 250-room hotel, convention center, residences, and amenities. A later report in September 2019 indicated uncertainty about the long-term plans for the property.

In June 2025, Florida-based PPG Development bought the 1,000-acre property for $14.75 million. In August 2026, they announced plans to redevelop the resort, with 100 hotel rooms, 175 homes, two golf courses, an equestrian center, a sports complex, restaurants, and a spa.

== In popular culture ==
Grossinger's was writer Eleanor Bergstein's inspiration for the fictional Kellerman’s Mountain House in her screenplay for the film Dirty Dancing. The film was shot in Virginia and North Carolina, because filming on location in New York was deemed too expensive. Bergstein frequently vacationed at Grossinger's as a child in the 1950s. Her family would travel from Brooklyn each summer to spend two weeks at the resort. She enjoyed dancing there, and won multiple competitions. For the screenplay, she combined elements of her own experiences, her sister's, and stories she heard from staff and guests at the resort while visiting it as an adult in the 1980s, researching the script.

== Description ==
Room 7276 in 1977

Like many Catskill resorts, Grossinger's expanded gradually, incorporating a range of architectural styles. It began as a Victorian hotel, was later remodeled with Mission-style elements, and underwent Tudor-style expansion in the 1940s. In the 1950s and 1960s, Modernist-style accommodations and entertainment facilities were added.

The original building, known as the former Nichols House, was designed by local architect Frank Cottle. Increased competition from nearby resorts in the 1940s prompted further development, including the large-scale expansion of the dining room, the creation of the Terrace Room nightclub, and the Pink Elephant bar. In 1949, architect Morris Lapidus, in one of his earliest hotel commissions, renovated and expanded the Terrace Room.

=== Liberty Airport ===
Liberty Airport Grossinger's Airport
- IATA: none; ICAO: none

Summary
- Airport type: Private
- Owner: Grossinger's Resort
- Operator: Grossinger's Resort
- Serves: Borscht Belt
- Location: Liberty, New York
- Opened: 1947
- Elevation AMSL: 1,590 ft (480 m)
- Coordinates: 41.382°N 73.766°W

Runways
Direction	Length		Surface
Direction	ft	m	Surface
3/21	3,200	975	Turf
25/43	1,800	548	Rock, stone

Liberty Airport also known as Grossinger's Airport was a public use airport in Liberty, New York, United States. The airport was owned by the resort and is located 2 miles (3.2 km) north of it. Liberty Airport covered an area of 100 acres (400,000 m^{2}) at an elevation of 1,590 feet (480 m) above mean sea level. By April 1947, Liberty Airport had a 2,800 feet (850 m) north/south runway and had expansion plans to 4,000 feet (1,200 m). A second 1,800 feet (550 m) rock and stone runway ran east/west. Consolidated Air Transit of East Orange, NJ operated DC-3s with tail numbers NC-79057 and NC-36699 at Liberty Airport in April 1947. Mohawk Airlines flew a Sikorsky S-55 with tail number N424A with 13 flights a week between Liberty and Newark airports.

== In media ==
Grossinger's is cited as the inspiration for the fictional "Kellerman's Mountain Resort" in the 1987 film Dirty Dancing.

In July 2025, Producers and Creators Harris Salomon (Atlantic Overseas Pictures Television) and Alan Zweibel announced a major scripted television series about the resort, "The Mountains". The dramatic comedy will focus on the lives of matriarch Jennie Grossinger and her daughter Elaine Etess Grossinger and chronicle the resort from its early days until its demise.

Paula Eiselt's 2025 documentary We Met at Grossinger's documents the rise and demise of the resort. The documentary is produced by Robert Friedman of Bungalow Media + Entertainment, an Emmy Award-winning and Grammy-nominated integrated entertainment company that develops, produces, and distributes content across all media platforms. Recent projects include Killer Confessions: Case Files of a Texas Ranger (ID/HBO Max), Little Richard: I Am Everything (HBO Max), If These Walls Could Rock, and 13 Days in Ferguson (CBS/Paramount+). The documentary is also Executive Produced and Created by Harris Salomon.

== See also ==
- Jewish country club
