= Camp Shane =

Weight loss camp for children, 1968–2021

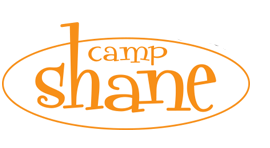
- Established: 1968
- Founder: Selma Ettenberg
- Founded at: Ferndale, New York
- Dissolved: 2021
- Location(s): Arizona, California, Connecticut, Georgia, New York, Texas, and Wisconsin
- Services: weight loss camp for children
- Owner: David Ettenberg

Camp Shane was a co-ed weight loss camp for children. Founded in 1968 in Ferndale, New York, by Selma Ettenberg, the camp ran for over 50 years. Directorship and ownership later passed to her son David Ettenberg. The camp hosted as many as 800 children per summer, including the children of various celebrities. Camp Shane inspired the weight loss camp in the film Heavyweights (1995) and was featured in an MTV True Life episode called "I'm Going to Fat Camp" (2002). Beginning in 2007, the camp expanded operations to 5 other states and opened a program for adults called Shane Diet & Fitness Resorts. Camp enrollment decreased in the 2010s. David sold the property in Ferndale in 2019 and moved the camp to Connecticut. After a 2021 state investigation found health and safety issues with the camp, David forfeited his license and the camp shut down permanently.

== History ==
=== Founding ===
Selma Ettenberg (1923-2012) worked at a girls' weight loss camp in upstate New York in the 1960s. She noticed that the campers talked about boys and seemed "frustrated into a state of hunger." In 1968, she and her husband Irving bought land in Ferndale, New York, to open Camp Shane, a co-ed weight loss camp. The camp ran a 7 week weight loss program of exercise and 1400 daily calories. Within a few years, the camp was serving 175 children every summer, many of whom returned for subsequent summers after regaining the weight they lost. By 1979, Selma was making the 2021 equivalent of about $1 million a year from the camp.

Selma's son David became the director of Camp Shane in 1982. In 1987, Selma and Irving agreed that they would give David a controlling interest in the camp by 1997. David and Selma had several disputes which eventually escalated into a lawsuit. To settle the dispute, David reached an agreement with his parents to buy the camp from them for $1.2 million. After changing her mind about the sale, Selma tried to cancel it, but a judge intervened. By 1994, David owned Camp Shane.

Selma continued to live close to camp and, according to David, may have tried to interfere with camp operations by trying to frame him for arson, submitting a complaint to the Department of Health, and reporting him to the IRS. David was convicted of tax evasion in 2004. Around that time, he was making around $2 million a year. Selma developed dementia and died in 2012.

=== New ownership ===
David hired Simon Greenwood to take over his responsibilities as camp director. In 1995, 400 campers attended Camp Shane's summer programs. By 1997, Camp Shane was offering stays of 3 different lengths. They reported that campers typically lost 10-15 pounds in the 3 week program, 20-25 pounds in the 6 weeks program, and 30-35 pounds in the 9 weeks program. The 9 week program cost $4,650. A significant part of the daily activities involved exercise, including aerobics, ropes courses, tennis, basketball, and soccer. Children of various celebrities attended the camp, including Mike Tyson, Tommy Mottola, Michael Bolton, Steven Tyler, Iman, Rip Torn, and F. Murray Abraham. After Camp Shane was featured in a 2002 MTV True Life episode called "I'm Going to Fat Camp", the number of campers increased to 500. By 2005, Camp Shane was reporting an enrollment of around 800 children per summer, approximately half of whom were returning campers.

According to David, CRC Health Group offered him $10 million in 2006 to make a nationwide network of Camp Shane programs, but he declined. Beginning in 2007, David expanded operations with the help of his wife Ziporah Janowski, (Note: Janowski has been credited as co-founder, president, co-owner, or director of Shane.) eventually holding programs in leased spaces in Arizona, California, Georgia, Texas, and Wisconsin. The Texas program was held at the Texas Military Institute in San Antonio and hosted 40 children in 2015. David and Janowski also established Shane Diet & Fitness Resorts, a weight loss program for adults with locations in Texas and New York.

According to former staff interviewed by Bloomberg, the Camp Shane location in New York was in poor physical condition by 2011. They recounted issues with plumbing, leaky roofs, and poor quality food as well as campers struggling with serious mental health issues and eating disorders. In 2014, David fired the camp's longtime director Simon Greenwood and returned to managing the camp himself. At the time, the 3 week program cost $3,890. Other weight loss camps for kids had opened up since 1968 and were competing with Camp Shane for campers. Camp Shane began to host fewer campers each summer. Together, the six Camp Shane locations hosted 459 children in 2017. That year, a camper in Georgia was allegedly raped by another camper while there was no counselor in the room. According to a lawsuit filed against Camp Shane and David, the assault happened after staff had complained about understaffing.

=== Move to Connecticut ===
David sold the property in Ferndale for more than $6 million in 2019. That year, he held Camp Shane at the Rectory School in Pomfret, Connecticut. The new camp was cited by state inspectors for 62 violations, including lack of staff medical training and improper medicine distribution. After the camp produced a corrective action plan, the state Office of Early Childhood (OEC) closed its investigation. David later stated that the violations were because he was adjusting to the difference in regulations between New York and Connecticut. Camp Shane did not hold any programs in 2020 due to the COVID-19 pandemic. Around that time, the camp was sued by two former campers who alleged that they were sexually assaulted by the theater director in the 1980s.

In 2021, the camp was limited to one location, the South Kent School in South Kent, Connecticut, because of COVID-19. The camp began operating in late June without a license. About 70 campers came. On 2 July, the OEC issued a license to the camp, despite noting a lack of CPR or nursing licenses on an inspection visit. David hired a new camp director who resigned soon after arriving at camp due to health and safety concerns. She filed a complaint with the state, and the OEC opened an investigation on 8 July.

On 10 July, a 8 year old child was seriously injured at the camp. She had multiple fractures in her head, a concussion, and pneumocephalus and was hospitalized for several days. According to David, the injury was caused by a goal post falling on her head. However, state investigators later reported that the cause of her injuries was unclear. On 13 July, David announced that the camp was closed, giving parents 48 hours to pick up their children. He attributed the closure to COVID-related staffing shortages, stating that almost half of the 22 counselors had already resigned, and denied that the lack of staff had caused the girl's injuries. The OEC and state Department of Children and Families publicly announced that they were investigating the camp for health and safety concerns.

In its investigation, the OEC determined that: "There was no leadership, minimum staffing, no specialists, and no preparation for the needs of the campers. Serious medical needs of the campers were not met". OEC noted several complaints from parents who said they had issues contacting the camp to express concerns. The investigation also found that Camp Shane submitted fraudulent documents to OEC and pushed campers to exercise to the point of vomiting. David forfeited his license to run the camp in August, and the state closed the investigation without taking any further action. As of 2023, David disputed the results of the OEC investigation, stating that it was based on false testimony from former employees and expressing interest in opening another summer camp. FOIA requests submitted by Hearst Connecticut brought to light email communication between OEC and Camp Shane between April and July 2021. According to The News-Times the e-mails indicate that the OEC was "focused on keeping the camp in operation and trying to avoid having to send kids home, even as it struggled to get the camp to comply with regulations."

In 2023, the Connecticut state legislature Committee on Children voted to hold a hearing regarding regulations for summer camps.

== Media coverage ==
External media
- Camp Shane promotional video from 2012 on YouTube

Camp Shane was covered by various broadcast news channels, including the BBC in 1990 and CBS in 2009. The 1995 film Heavyweights is about Camp Hope, a fictional weight loss camp inspired by Camp Shane. In 2002, Camp Shane was featured in an MTV True Life episode called "I'm Going to Fat Camp". A 2025 podcast, Camp Shame, was created by Kelsey Snelling, a journalist and former Camp Shane counselor. According to an iHeartRadio press release, the podcast features testimony from former campers regarding "extreme diets, intense physical regimens and psychological tactics aimed at enforcing conformity to narrow beauty standards".
