= Weight loss camp =

Residential program for weight management

A fat camp, weight loss camp, or fat farm is a type of residential program where people who are overweight or obese go to attempt to lose weight through exercise and lifestyle changes.

== Overview ==
One goal of weight loss camps is to help the guests lose weight.

Some programs not only focus on weight loss, but on changing behavior through a combination of training on self-regulatory behaviors and cognitive-behavioral therapy (CBT), as well as maintaining weight loss after campers return home. Some experts believe these are key elements of an effective program.

One study found that adolescents reported decreased body shape dissatisfaction and increased self-esteem immediately after losing weight at a weight loss camp. These improvements were directly related to the amount of weight lost, with the greatest benefit to those adolescents who lost the most weight.

== In popular culture ==
Multiple films and television shows have featured or mentioned programs such as these, including:

=== Films ===
- Fat Camp: An MTV Docs Movie Presentation (2006), a documentary television film about five teens at a camp called Camp Pocono Trails (CPT), in the Pocono Mountains in Northeastern Pennsylvania.
- Heavyweights (1995), an American comedy film centered around a camp for kids that is taken over by a fitness guru. It was inspired by Camp Shane.
- The Goonies (1985), While being interrogated by the film's antagonists, Chunk confesses he was kicked out of a fat camp for going on a feeding frenzy during lunch.

=== Television ===
- Multiple episodes of Friends mention that Monica Geller, who used to be overweight before the beginning of the show, went to fat camp in her youth.
- "Fat Camp" (South Park), season 4, episode 15 of the animated television series South Park, original airdate December 6, 2000: in the episode, Cartman is sent to lose weight at a fat camp where he discovers a different way to earn money.
- In 2002, Camp Shane was featured in an MTV True Life episode called "I'm Going to Fat Camp".
- The Biggest Loser, a reality television format which started with the American TV series The Biggest Loser in 2004, which centers on overweight and obese participants competing against each other to lose the highest percentage of weight (or most weight) to become the "biggest loser".
- Huge is an American fictional TV series that aired in 2010, starring Nikki Blonsky as a teenager who is sent to a weight loss camp against her will. It was developed by Winnie Holzman and Savannah Dooley.
- Heavy is an American documentary series that aired on A&E. The series is filmed at the Hilton Head Health Wellness Resort and chronicles the weight loss efforts of people with severe obesity. It ran for one season, from January 17 to April 4, 2011.
- Killer Queen (Family Guy) Season 10, Episode 16 of the animated FOX sitcom Family Guy, Peter and Chris Griffin attend a weight loss camp, but when some other campers are found dead, the blame falls on Lois Griffin's brother, Patrick Pewterschmit, as he was imprisoned for the murder of obese people.
- One of the suspects in the first episode of Columbo season 3 ("Lovely but Lethal") runs a fat farm, which is presented in the episode as a kind of cult.

== See also ==
- Fitness boot camp
- Wellspring camps
