= Jewish Community Center of White Sulphur Springs =

Historic former synagogue in White Sulphur Springs, New York, United States

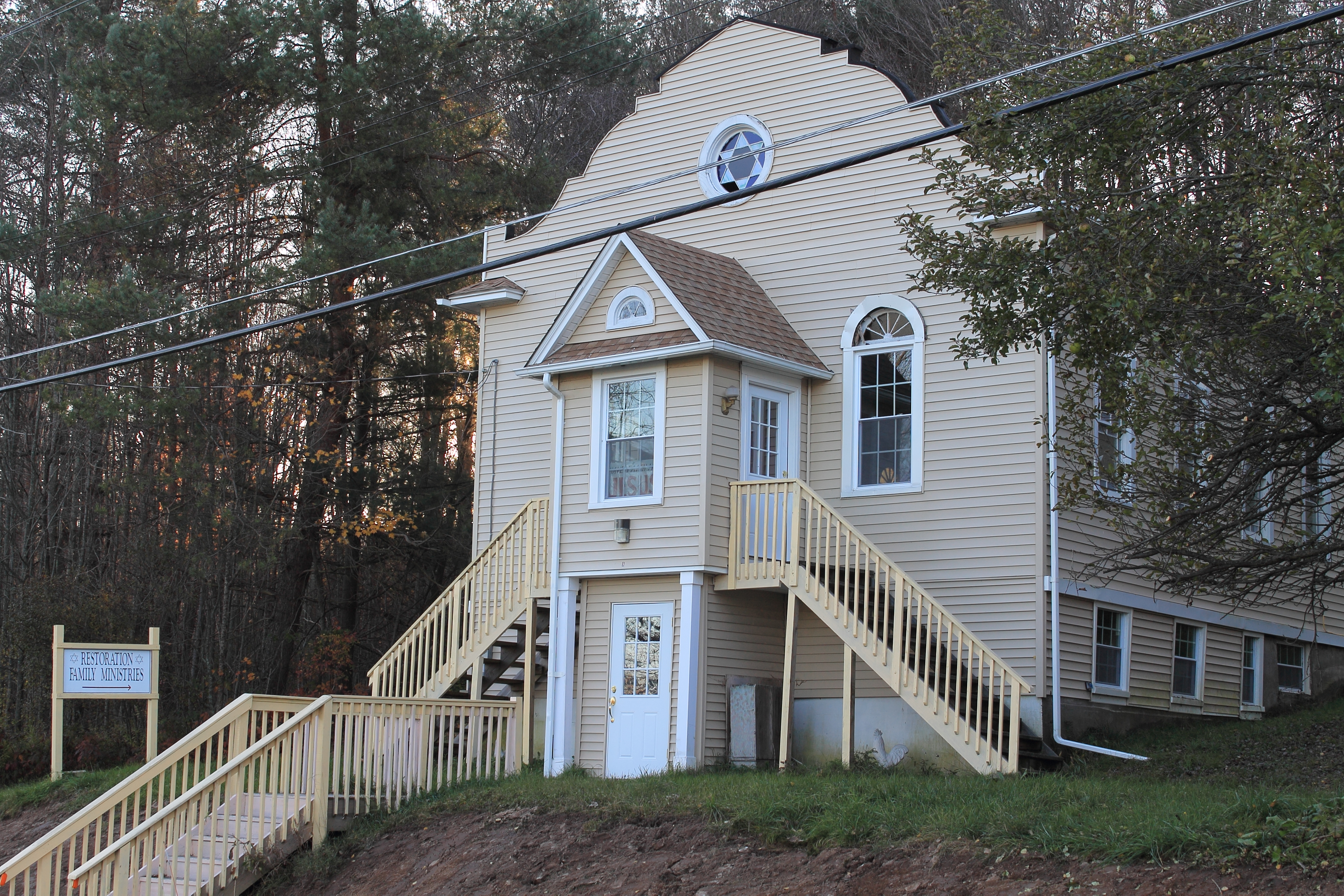
- The former synagogue in 2012

- Location of the former synagogue in New York

Religion
- Affiliation: Judaism (former)
- Ecclesiastical or organizational status: Synagogue (former)

Location
- Location: Briscoe Road, White Sulphur Springs, Sullivan County, New York
- Country: United States
- Interactive map of Jewish Community Center of White Sulphur Springs
- Coordinates: 41°47′56″N 74°49′52″W

Architecture
- Completed: 1934
- Jewish Community Center of White Sulphur Springs
- U.S. National Register of Historic Places
- Area: less than one acre
- NRHP reference No.: 99000991
- Added to NRHP: August 12, 1999

Jewish Community Center of White Sulphur Springs, also known as White Sulpher Springs Synagogue, is a historic former Jewish congregation and synagogue located on Briscoe Road, White Sulphur Springs, Sullivan County, New York, in United States.

The synagogue was built in 1934 and is a rectangular, 1-story building built into a hillside. It is a three-by-five-bay frame structure clad in asbestos-cement tiles. The front facade features a stepped, pedimented parapet that extends beyond the roofline.

The synagogue was added to the National Register of Historic Places in 1999.

By 2005 the synagogue had been abandoned and sold to auctioneers, who were trying to onset the building.
