= Tefereth Israel Anshei Parksville Synagogue =

Historic former synagogue in Parksville, New York, United States

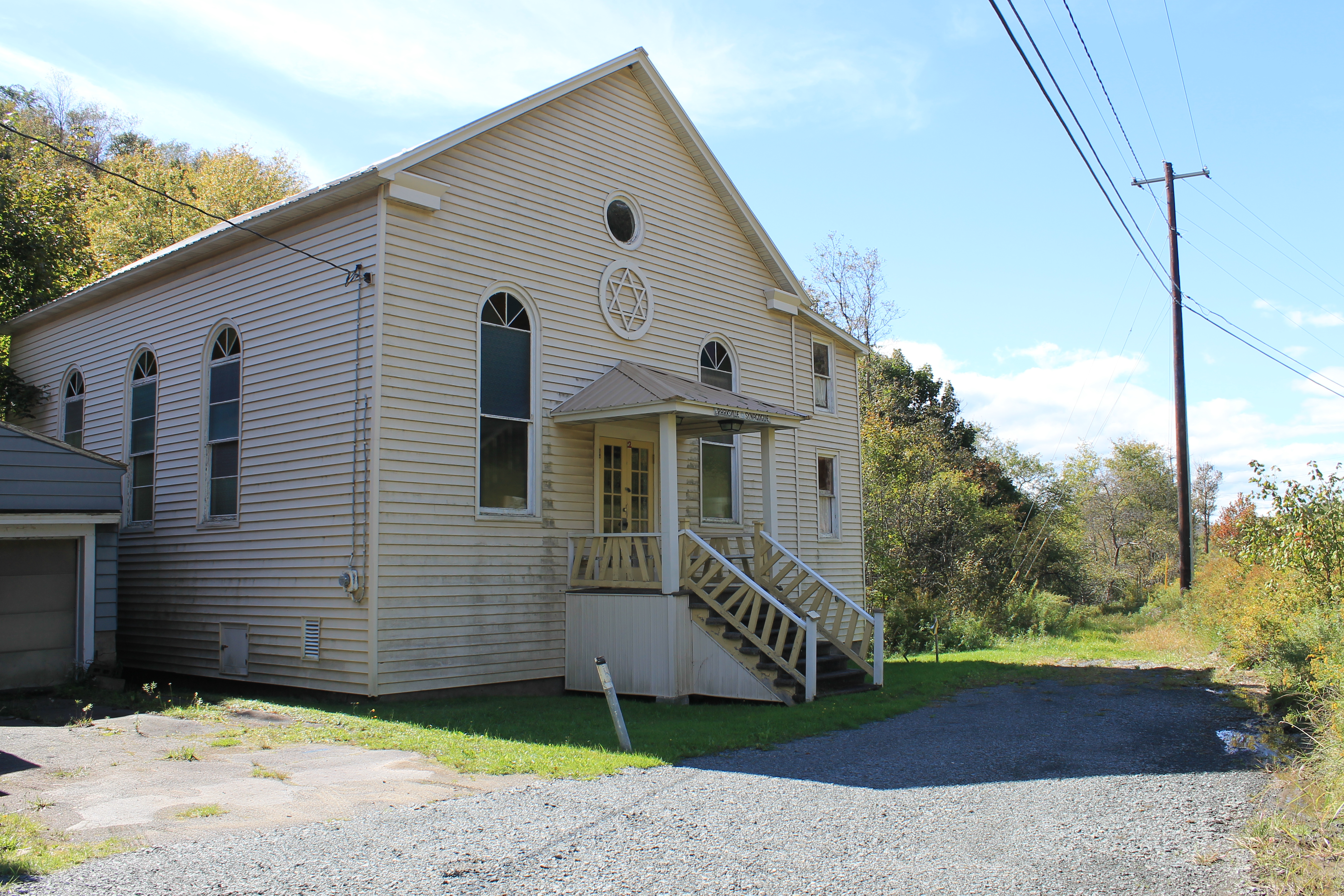
- The former synagogue in 2012

- Location of the former synagogue in New York

Religion
- Affiliation: Judaism (former)
- Ecclesiastical or organizational status: Synagogue (1907–2007); Arts center (since 2021)
- Status: Closed (as a synagogue); Repurposed

Location
- Location: 2 Main Street, Parksville, Sullivan County, New York 12768
- Country: United States
- Interactive map of Tefereth Israel Anshei Parksville Synagogue
- Coordinates: 41°51′28″N 74°45′45″W

Architecture
- Completed: 1907
- Tefereth Israel Anshei Parksville Synagogue
- U.S. National Register of Historic Places
- Area: less than one acre
- NRHP reference No.: 99000990
- Added to NRHP: August 12, 1999

Tefereth Israel Anshei Parksville Synagogue is a historic former Jewish congregation and synagogue, located at 2 Main Street in Parksville, Sullivan County, New York, in the United States.

The synagogue was constructed in 1907 and is a 1 1/2-story, wood-frame building on a deep stone building and built into the side of a hill. It is topped by a gable roof and features a small wooden entrance portico with a hipped roof.

It was added to the National Register of Historic Places in 1999.

The synagogue was last used in 2007 for a Jewish wedding and remained vacant until purchased by Adrian and Todd Perlmutter. In 2021 it was announced that the former synagogue would be repurposed as an arts center.
