= Sewing Woman =

1983 film

- Directed by: Arthur Dong
- Written by: Lorraine Dong
- Produced by: Arthur Dong
- Narrated by: Lisa Lu
- Cinematography: Arthur Dong
- Edited by: Arthur Dong
- Production company: DeepFocus Productions
- Distributed by: Third World Newsreel
- Release date: October 1982
- Running time: 14 minutes
- Country: United States
- Language: English

Sewing Woman is a 1982 American short documentary film directed by Arthur Dong about one woman's journey to America, from an arranged marriage in old China to life in San Francisco. It was nominated for an Academy Award for Best Documentary Short in 1984.

== Synopsis ==
Sewing Woman is an oral history of the filmmaker's mother, Zem Ping Dong, who immigrated from China and worked in San Francisco's garment industry for over thirty years.
