= Liberty, New York =

- Town
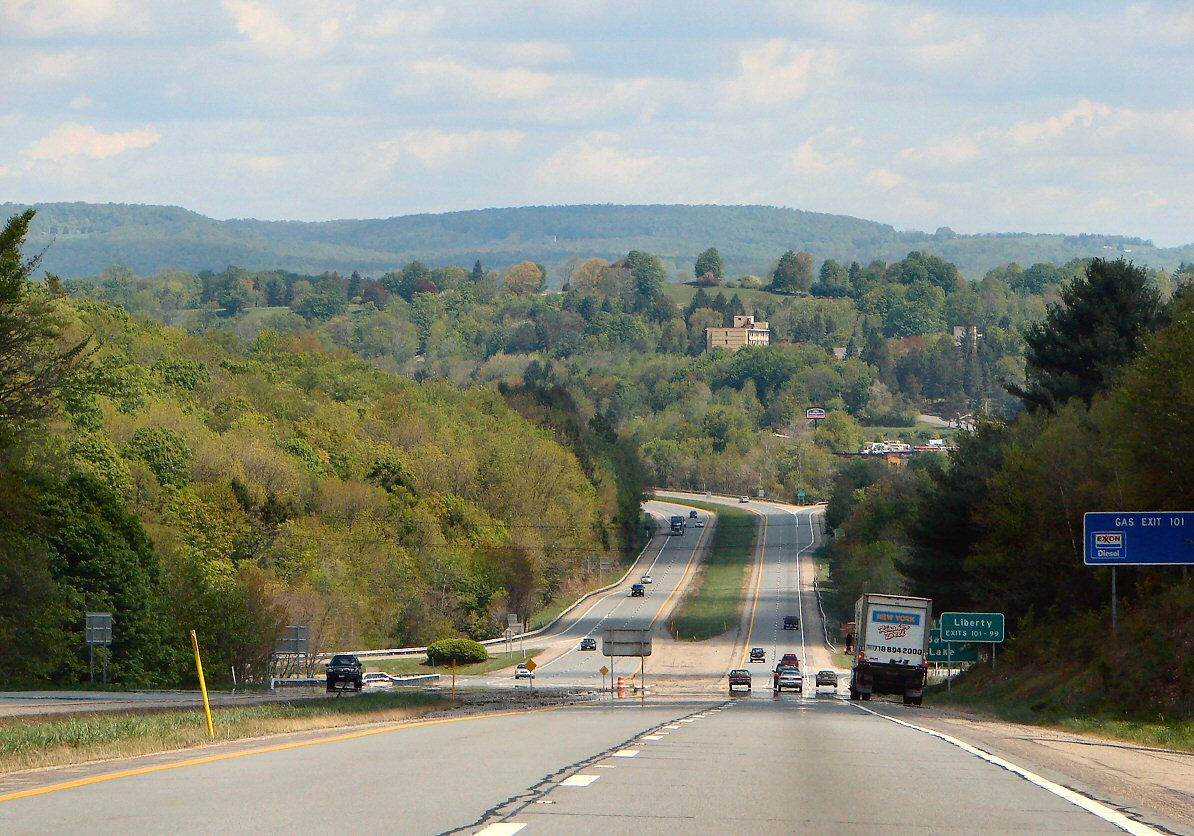
- State Route 17 at Liberty (2008)

- Location of the town of Liberty in Sullivan County, New York
- Coordinates: 41°48′05″N 074°44′48″W
- Country: United States
- State: New York
- County: Sullivan County

Government
  - Town Supervisor: Frank DeMayo

Area
  - Total: 80.74 sq mi (209.11 km^{2})
  - Land: 79.58 sq mi (206.12 km^{2})
  - Water: 1.15 sq mi (2.99 km^{2})

Population (2020)
  - Total: 10,159
  - Density: 116.7/sq mi (45.04/km^{2})
- Demonym: Libertian
- Time zone: UTC-5 (Eastern (EST))
  - Summer (DST): UTC-4 (EDT)
- FIPS code: 36-105-42224
- Website: www.townofliberty.org

Liberty is a town in Sullivan County, New York, United States. The population was 10,159 at the 2020 census. The village is bisected by NY 52 and NY 55, and is crossed by NY 17.

== History ==
The town of Liberty area is credited with providing 303 men who fought in the Revolution. Liberty was carved originally from the then large township of Lumberland and was itself at this time so large that it included the present Towns of Callicoon and Fremont. The Town today covers 85 square miles.

When the first settlers came to this area, known as the Blue Mountain country, they settled to the Northwest of the present village at the existing Revonah Lake formerly known as Broadhead Pond. The early settlers came here from Connecticut and some of the oldest remains left in the Town are the laid up stones in the outlet of Revonah Lake which were probably placed there in 1797 for the purpose of building the first sawmill in the area.

As the land was cleared of the dense dark hemlock forest that the early settlers found, the area went through various stages of development. After the farms were cleared one of the earlier forms of industry to be established was the tanneries which ran through the Civil War era. Following this, the dairy farming came into its own, to be followed by the taking in of “summer boarders” which gradually led to the founding of the large hotels: the Wawonda, Liberty House and many others.

It was along about 1900 that the large Loomis Sanatorium was established for the care of TB or tubercular patients and Liberty in general went through another stage of its development which lasted until other cures beside the fresh air and rest were found.

It was also early in the century that the Workmen's Circle, a leading Jewish fraternal order, built a sanatorium east of Liberty: the property now occupied by the County Home and Infirmary and also the site of the Social Service Buildings.

Then, the town in general fell back to its dependency upon the tourists and its so-called summer season. Being blessed with an abundance of rural beauty and nearness to the metropolitan area provides many advantages in this respect.

As the years went by, and different settlements began to develop, they eventually became the Village and Hamlets that we know today. Some of the old settlements either changed their names or were lost in the ways of progress. Doubtenville, Glen Cove, Egypt and Red Brick are just a few of the lost communities.

Still remaining within the confines of the Town of Liberty today are the Village of Liberty and the smaller hamlets of Ferndale, Parksville, Swan Lake and White Sulphur Springs.

The Village of Liberty, incorporated on September 17, 1870, is by far the largest of the Town's communities, being located at the crossroads of the Quickway (Route 17) and State Highway Route 52.

Liberty can boast of its tanneries, of the old Liberty Normal Institute, established in 1847, its famous Coaching Day Parades, and its hotels of the 1900 era. The Liberty House was the greatest and was the site of many Lincoln Dinners and reunions of the Grand Army of the Republic.

Of the smaller hamlets, Parksville is the only one to maintain its original name. Even before the formation of the Town of Liberty there were people in this area. The Martins and the Halls were early settlers, arriving in 1804. At a later date the Parks family came to the area and proved to be extremely active and productive and through their efforts came the name Parksville; otherwise, it more than likely would have been known as “Martinsville.”

White Sulphur Springs was originally called Robertsonville, being named for Bradley Robertson, who left Connecticut and settled in the area in 1809, and later fought in the war of 1812.

The Hamlet has always been a rural area. At one time it was surrounded by many small dairy farms and had a cheese factory operating within its bounds.

In the 1890s and early 1900s it was doing a thriving hotel and Boarding House business. It was during this period of time that a large hotel, called the White Sulphur Springs House was built. The hotel took its name from the Sulphur Spring whose waters were supposed to have medicinal benefits which were obtainable either by drinking or bathing in it.

In December, 1890 Robertsonville officially changed its name to White Sulphur Springs, no doubt to further help the promotion of the tourist trade.

In later years many additional hotels were constructed in the Hamlet and the business flourished in the summer for many years.

Ferndale, originally known as Liberty Falls, was settled by Roswell Russell in 1807. During the Civil War era, it had thriving tanneries within its confines. The tall brick chimney of one of the tanneries stood until sometime in the 1950s, when it was taken down for its bricks.

The name was changed from Liberty Falls to Ferndale by the NYO&W Railway because of a mix up of the mails.

The name Ferndale covers a much larger area than the hamlet itself.

Ferndale is credited with having the Grossinger Resort Hotel within its boundaries. This large layout all started by the Grossinger family taking in a few summer boarders to help meet expenses in 1914.

Swan Lake originally called Stevensville, was named after the Stevens brothers, who built a large sole leather tannery there. The tannery was in existence until about 1873.

Since the 1880s, the Swan Lake area has been noted for its hotel and tourist industry. Many of the local farm girls found jobs there in the early 1900s. The lake has always had an abundance of fish and brings sportsmen into the area.

Alden S. Swan arrived there from New York about 1895 and by the time of his death in 1917 owned much of the land and all of the lake. The name was changed to Swan Lake in January 1927. The Swan estate was purchased by Siegel and Kretchmer, and the Siegels went on to build the Commodore and Stevensville Hotels: the latter developing into a large, sprawling hotel run by the Dinnerstein family.

Liberty was a mainstay, with Grossinger's Hotel and several other Borscht Belt attractions, but, once their doors closed, so ended the lifestyle which made Liberty desirable to tourism.

== Geography ==
According to the United States Census Bureau, the town has a total area of 80.7 square miles (209.0 km^{2}), of which 79.6 square miles (206.2 km^{2}) is land and 1.1 square miles (2.8 km^{2}) (1.36%) is water.

=== Communities within Liberty ===
- Cooley – a location near the northern town line.
- Ferndale (formerly Liberty Falls) – a hamlet south of Liberty village on Route 17. The Ferndale School, Manion's General Store, and Shelburne Playhouse are listed on the National Register of Historic Places.
- Grossinger – a hamlet south of Liberty village on Route 17. Formerly this was the site of Grossinger's Catskill Resort Hotel
- Liberty – village on Route 17.
- Loomis – a hamlet west of Liberty village.
- Parksville – a hamlet north of Liberty village on Route 17. The Tefereth Israel Anshei Parksville Synagogue was listed on the National Register of Historic Places in 1999.
- Revonah Lake (formerly Brodhead Pond) – a lake northwest of Liberty village, that was probably the first settlement site in the town.
- Swan Lake (formerly Stevensville) – a hamlet near the southern town line, located at the eastern end of a lake called "Swan Lake."
- White Sulphur Springs (formerly Robertsonville) – a hamlet in the southwestern part of the town on Route 52. The Jewish Community Center of White Sulphur Springs was listed on the National Register of Historic Places in 1999.

== Demographics ==
Historical population
Census	Pop.	Note	%±
2000	9,632		—
2010	9,885		2.6%
2020	10,159		2.8%
U.S. Decennial Census 2020

As of the census of 2000, there were 9,632 people, 3,711 households, and 2,263 families residing in the town. The population density was 121.0 inhabitants per square mile (46.7/km^{2}). There were 5,350 housing units at an average density of 67.2 per square mile (25.9/km^{2}). The racial makeup of the town was 83.70% white, 9.19% black or African American, 0.37% Native American, 1.43% Asian, .01% Pacific Islander, 3.76% from other races, and 1.54% from two or more races. Hispanic or Latino of any race were 10.9% of the population.

There were 3,711 households, out of which 30.9% had children under the age of 18 living with them, 42.7% were married couples living together, 13.3% had a female householder with no husband present, and 39.0% were non-families. 32.2% of all households were made up of individuals, and 13.6% had someone living alone who was 65 years of age or older. The average household size was 2.43 and the average family size was 3.08.

In the town, the population was spread out, with 24.7% under the age of 18, 7.6% from 18 to 24, 27.4% from 25 to 44, 23.5% from 45 to 64, and 16.8% who were 65 years of age or older. The median age was 39 years. For every 100 females, there were 95.6 males. For every 100 females age 18 and over, there were 92.2 males.

The median income for a household in the town was $32,022, and the median income for a family was $37,689. Males had a median income of $31,088 versus $24,655 for females. The per capita income for the town was $17,565. About 12.1% of families and 17.1% of the population were below the poverty line, including 19.0% of those under age 18 and 11.4% of those age 65 or over.

== Education ==
The Liberty Central School District has three schools in Liberty, including Liberty High School.

The Catholic schools in closest proximity to Liberty are Our Lady of Mount Carmel Elementary School in Wallkill and St. John Elementary School in Goshen. St. Peter's Regional School, the final remaining Catholic school in Sullivan County, closed in 2019. At the time it had 42 students. The school became an early learning center in 2016 after an earlier plan to close the school was canceled.

== Notable people ==
- Allan Bérubé, historian, activist, and award-winning author
- Alan Gerry, founder of Cablevision Industries
- Robert Y. Grant, Justice of the Peace from 1849 to 1855; supervisor of the town of Liberty in 1854 and 1859; postmaster of Liberty from 1855; and a member of the New York State Senate (9th D.) in 1860 and 1861.
- Taylor Jardine, lead singer for Sainte and We Are The In Crowd
- Zoe Leonard, artist
- Maurice Martin, Basketball Player
- Kaseem Sinceno, former NFL player and graduate of Liberty High School

== Film ==
Liberty is the setting of David Cross's film Hits. The film was also used as the setting for the 2018 drama Nancy.
