= White Sulphur Springs, New York =

Coordinates: 41°48′09″N 074°49′59.3″W

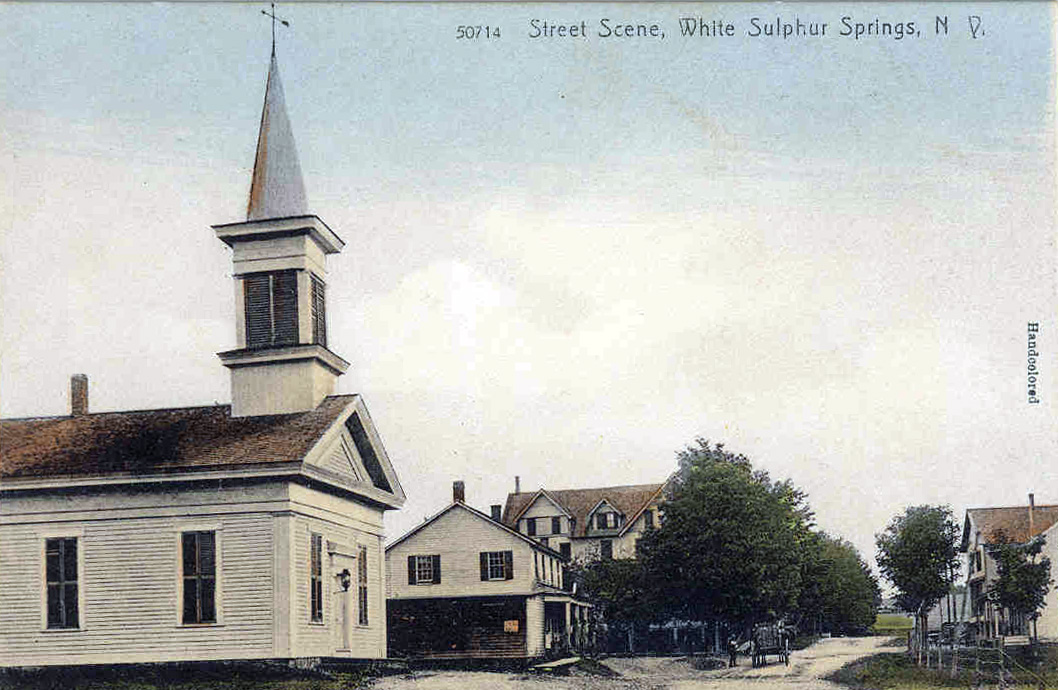
Postcard of White Sulphur Springs, New York

White Sulphur Springs is a hamlet in Liberty, Sullivan County, New York, United States. It is a rural area, and at one point it was surrounded by small dairy farms and had a cheese factory within its bounds.

The community was originally named Robertsonville in honor of Jonathan Bradley Robertson for his service during the War of 1812. Robertson came to the vicinity of Liberty, New York, in 1807 from Bridgeport, Connecticut. In the late 1890s and early 1900s, a large hotel called the White Sulpher Springs House was built, named after the nearby Sulphur Spring, which supposedly had medicinal benefits. Robertsonville was renamed in December 1890 to White Sulphur Springs, likely to promote the local tourism business.
