= Shelburne Playhouse =

- U.S. National Register of Historic Places
- Location within New York Location within the United States
- Location: Upper Ferndale Rd., Ferndale, New York
- Coordinates: 41°46′38″N 74°44′25″W
- Area: 4 acres (1.6 ha)
- Built: 1922; 104 years ago
- NRHP reference No.: 04000284
- Added to NRHP: April 15, 2004

Shelburne Playhouse is a historic theatre located at Ferndale in Sullivan County, New York. It was built in 1922 as part of a small resort known as the Shelburne Hotel and used as the hotel social hall. It is a long, rectangular wood-frame building, 95 feet long and 35 feet wide. It consists of two components: a large five-by-four-bay structure that houses the main seating area / dance hall and a slightly lower three-by-one-bay entrance pavilion. The building is coated in stucco with applied wooden battens and a surmounted by a gable roof in the Tudor Revival style.

It was added to the National Register of Historic Places in 2004. With Maurice Gerry, Allan Bérubé (1946–2007) coordinated its restoration and initiated its being placed on the New York State and national register.
