= Manion's General Store =

Historic commercial building in New York, United States

- U.S. National Register of Historic Places
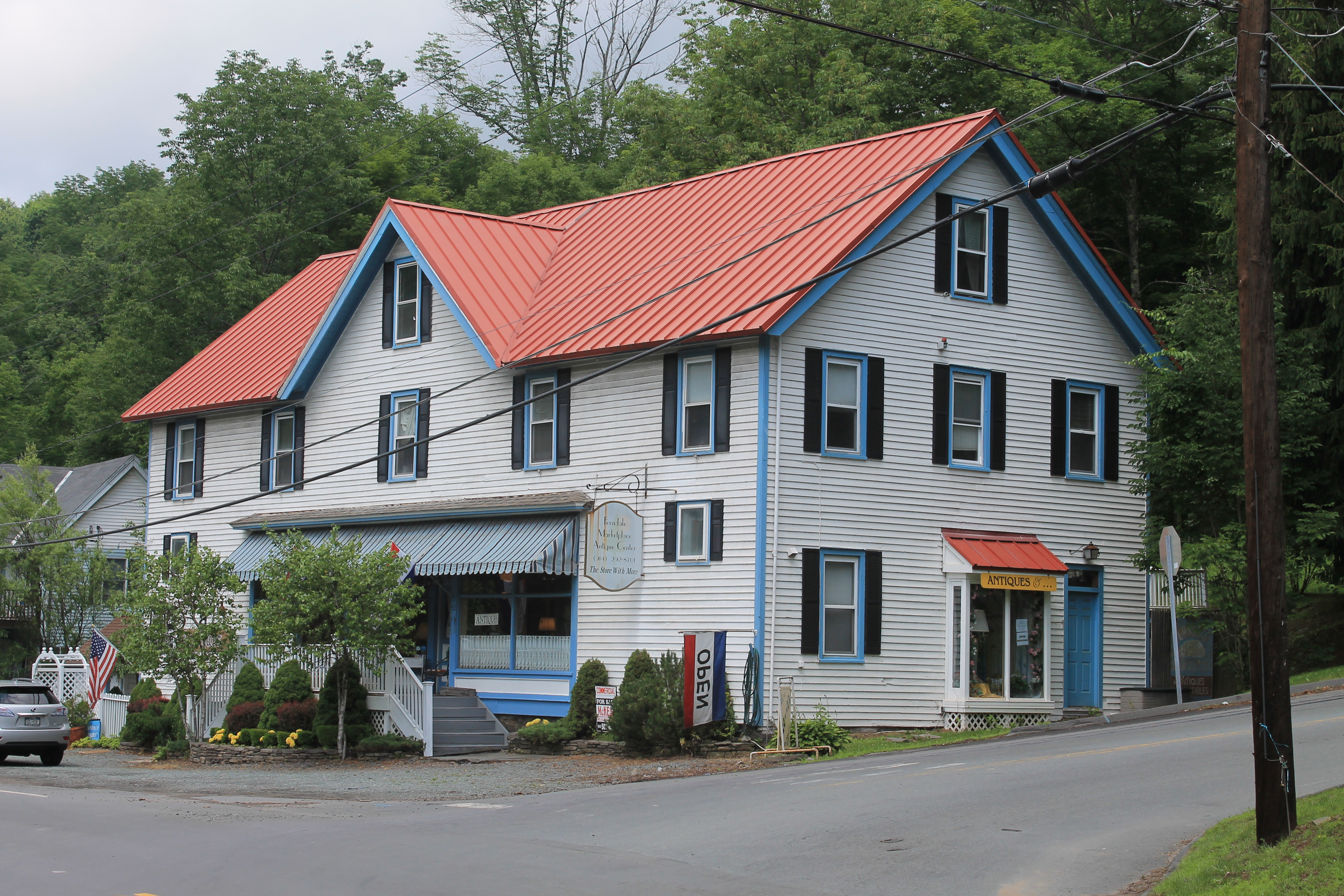
- Manion's General Store

- Location within New York Location within the United States
- Location: 52 Ferndale Rd., Ferndale, New York
- Coordinates: 41°46′26″N 74°44′22″W
- Area: less than one acre
- Built: 1915
- NRHP reference No.: 04000285
- Added to NRHP: April 15, 2004

Manion's General Store is a historic general store and post office located at Ferndale in Sullivan County, New York. It was built before 1908 and is a large, frame building. It is two and one half stories tall, five bays wide and three bays deep, with a gable roof and deep overhanging eaves. It is built into a hillside and has a stone foundation. The store operated into the 1970s and the post office to the 1980s.

It was added to the National Register of Historic Places in 2004.
