= Coming Out Under Fire =

- Directed by: Arthur Dong
- Written by: Arthur Dong; Allan Bérubé
- Produced by: Arthur Dong
- Narrated by: Salome Jens
- Cinematography: Stephen Lighthill
- Edited by: Veronica Selver
- Music by: Mark Adler
- Production company: Deep Focus Films
- Distributed by: Zeitgeist Films
- Release date: 1994
- Running time: 71 minutes
- Country: United States
- Language: English

Coming Out Under Fire is a 1994 documentary film directed and produced by Arthur Dong and narrated by actress Salome Jens. Based on Allan Bérubé's book of the same title, the film examines the attitudes toward homosexuality in the United States Armed Forces during World War II.

Dong and Bérubé co-wrote the screenplay. It was funded with grants from the National Endowment for the Arts and the Corporation for Public Broadcasting 1994). Other credits include: Director of photography, Stephen Lighthill; edited by Veronica Selver; music by Mark Adler. It was released by Zeitgeist Films and had a running time of 71 minutes.

The film aired nationally on PBS in June 1995. It was released on home video in 1996 and on DVD in 2003.

== Awards ==
- Special Jury Recognition For Technical Achievement at the Sundance Film Festival, 1994.
- Teddy Award at the Berlin International Film Festival, 1994.
- George Foster Peabody Award for Excellence in Television Broadcasting 1995.
- GLAAD Media Award Best Documentary

== See also ==
- Bibliography of works on the United States military and LGBT+ topics
