= Ferndale School =

- U.S. National Register of Historic Places
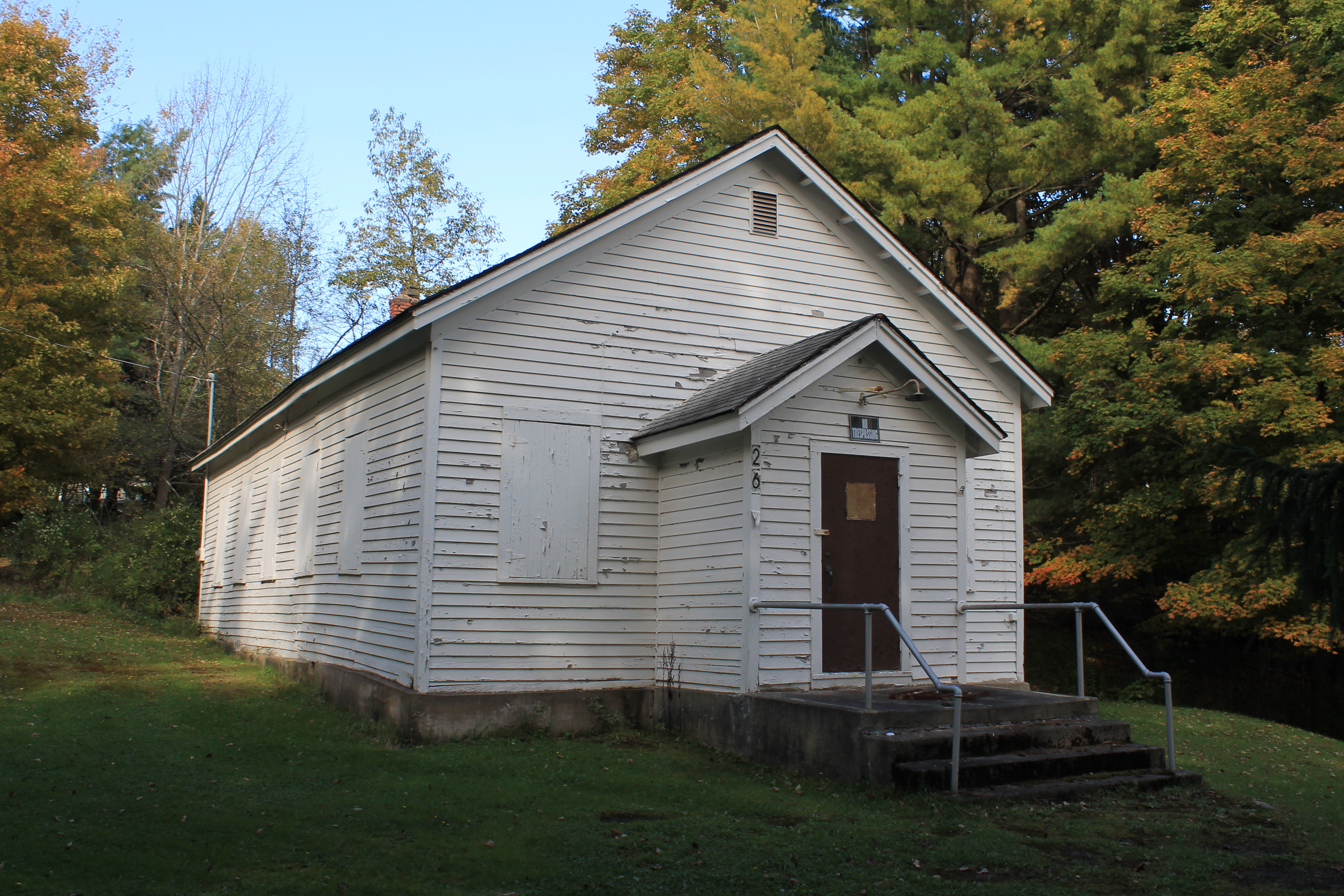

- Location within New York Location within the United States
- Location: Upper Ferndale Rd. and Ferndale Loomis Rd., Ferndale, New York
- Coordinates: 41°46′37″N 74°44′28″W
- Area: less than one acre
- NRHP reference No.: 04001437
- Added to NRHP: January 5, 2005

Ferndale School, also known as District 6 School, is a historic one-room school located at Ferndale in Sullivan County, New York. It was built about 1850 and is a one-story, wood-frame building with clapboard siding surmounted by a gable roof with exposed rafters. It is three bays wide and five bays deep. A small wing was added in the early 20th century. Also on the property is a woodshed. It was used as a school into the 1950s.

It was added to the National Register of Historic Places in 2005.
