= Hollywood Chinese =

2007 documentary film by Arthur Dong

Hollywood Chinese: The Chinese in American Feature Films
- Directed by: Arthur Dong
- Written by: Arthur Dong
- Produced by: Arthur Dong
- Starring: Ang Lee; Nancy Kwan; Christopher Lee; Wayne Wang
- Music by: Mark Adler
- Distributed by: Deep Focus Productions
- Release dates: March 18, 2007 (San Francisco International Asian American Film Festival); May 2, 2008 (United States)
- Running time: 89 minutes
- Country: United States
- Language: English

Hollywood Chinese: The Chinese in American Feature Films is a 2007 American documentary film directed by Academy Award-nominated director Arthur Dong.

From early films like the 1900s Beheading the Chinese Prisoner to Ang Lee's triumphant Brokeback Mountain in 2005, Dong uses clips of more than 100 films and interviews of prominent Chinese Americans to create a thorough overview on the depiction of Chinese in mainstream Hollywood films. He hits many major points such as white performers who portray Asians in both The Good Earth and Fu Manchu series, Nancy Kwan's roles in The World of Suzie Wong and Flower Drum Song, Bruce Lee and the emergence of martial arts films and Justin Lin's take on his film Better Luck Tomorrow. People interviewed include Christopher Lee, Wayne Wang, James Hong, Nancy Kwan, Luise Rainer, Amy Tan and B. D. Wong. Dong also spends time talking about his discovery of two reels of the 1916-17 silent film The Curse of Quon Gwon, which is considered to be the first feature film made by an Asian American.

The documentary was also broadcast on PBS on May 27, 2009.

== Reviews ==
On Rotten Tomatoes the film has a score of 100% based on reviews from 18 critics, with an average rating of 7.8/10.

== Awards and honors ==
- 2007 Golden Horse Film Awards: Best Documentary
- Henry Hampton Awards winner
- Official selection, Toronto International Film Festival
- Special presentation, AFI Fest, Los Angeles
