= Parksville, New York =

- Hamlet
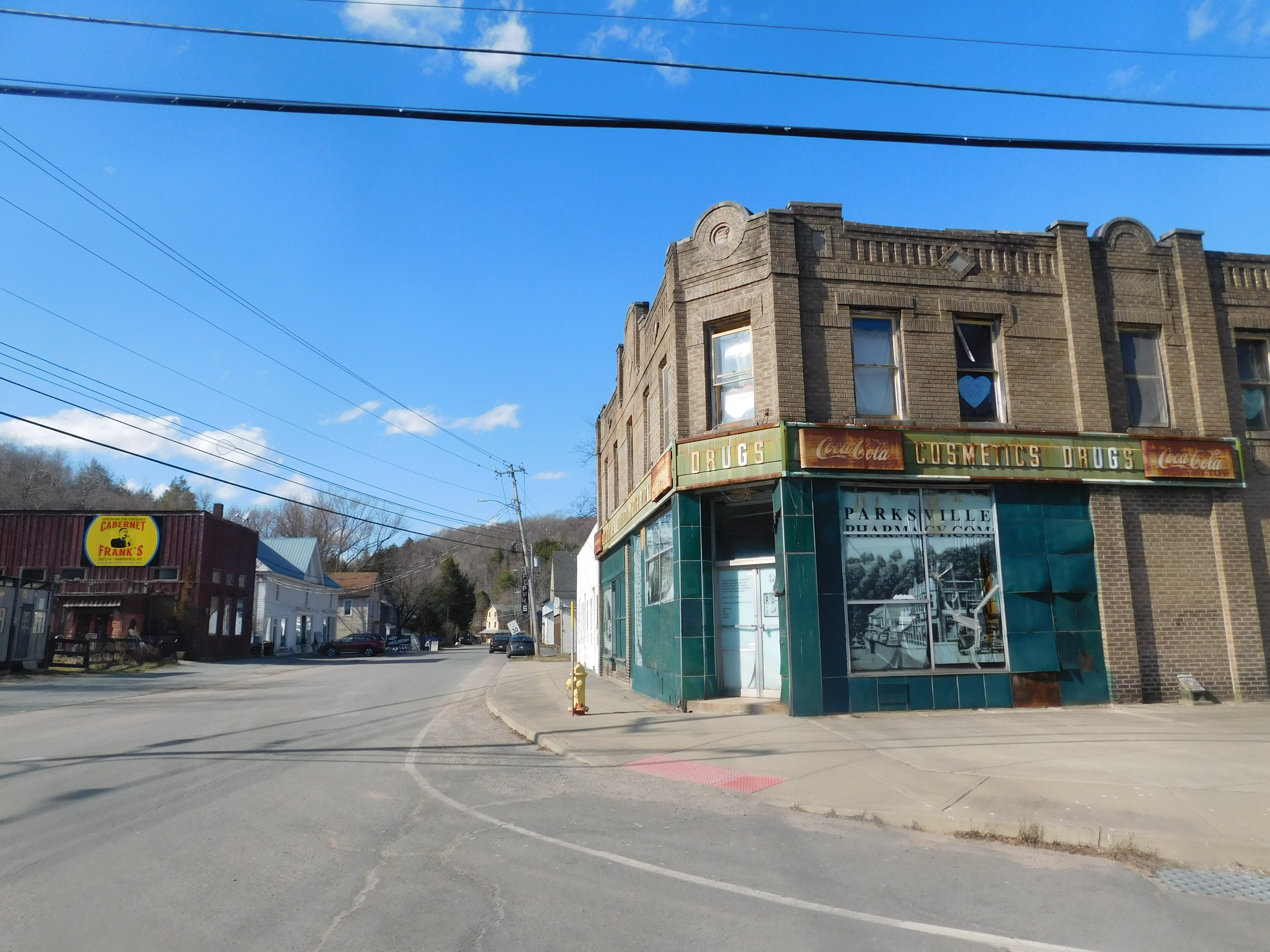
- Main Street in Parksville in March 2024.

- Location within the state of New York
- Coordinates: 41.8567°N 74.7578°W
- Country: United States
- State: New York
- County: Sullivan
- Time zone: UTC−5 (Eastern (EST))
  - Summer (DST): UTC−4 (EDT)
- ZIP Code: 12768

Parksville is a hamlet in the town of Liberty, Sullivan County, New York. Located east of exit 98 on State Route 17 (future Interstate 86), the community centers around the junction of County Route 85 (Cooley Road) and County Route 176 (Old Route 17). Prior to the opening of the current exit 98 in the autumn of 2011, all traffic on Route 17 went through Parksville at-grade, with a traffic light at the Cooley Road junction.

It is unknown the exact year that Parksville was settled, but Lemuel Martin settled there in 1800. William Parks moved there in the early 1800s. He and his son Elijah built mills and improved Parksville, and gained more respect than Martin, much to Martin's chagrin. He wanted to call it Martinville but the residents chose Parks, and the hamlet was named Parksville. In 1880, the New York, Ontario and Western Railroad reached Parksville. It ran trains there until March 29, 1957 when the entire line was abandoned.

== History ==
=== Route 17 bypass ===
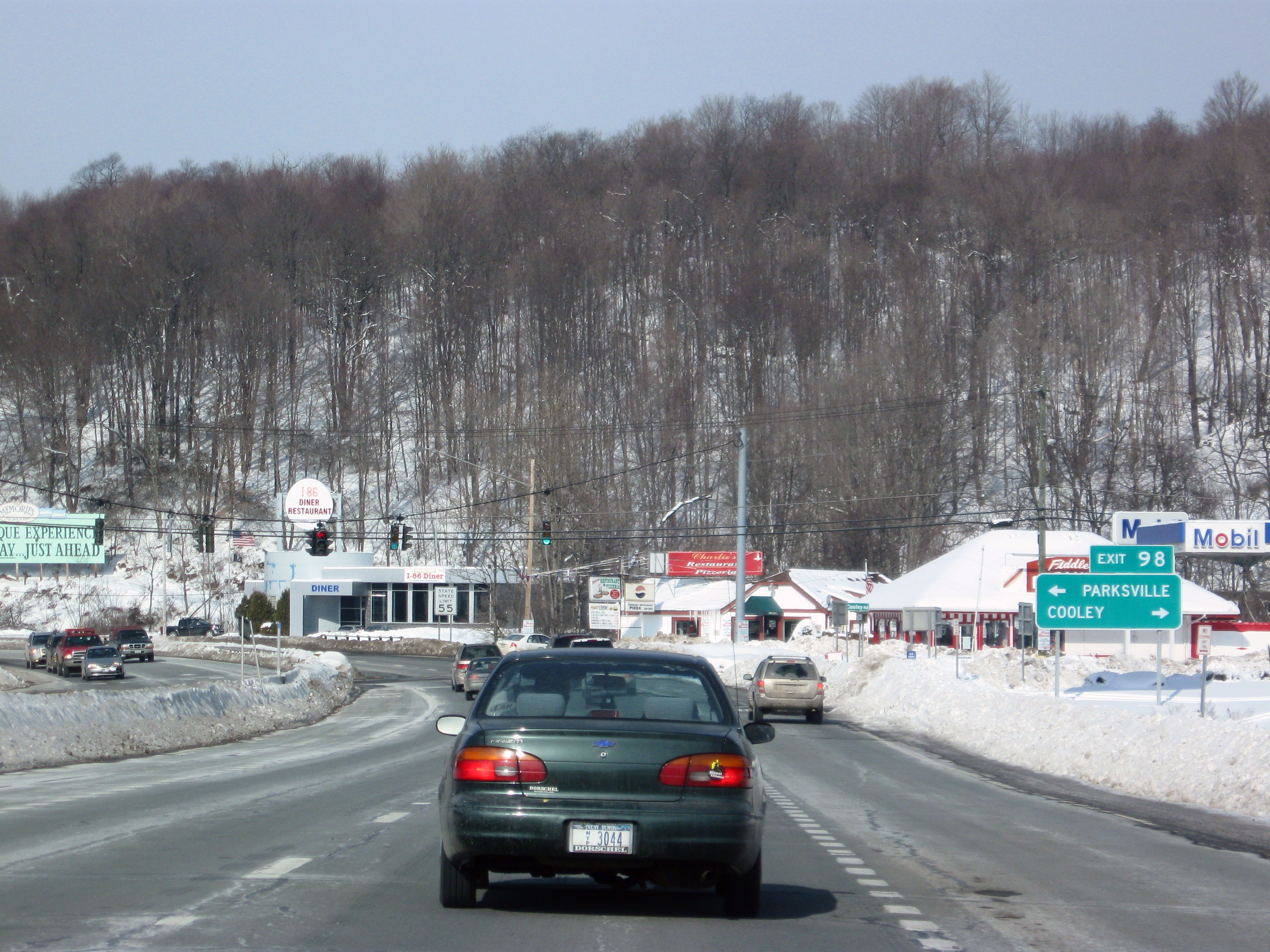
Parksville business district in 2009, prior to the NY 17 bypass

In May 2007, the New York State Department of Transportation (NYSDOT) announced plans to shift all traffic on Route 17 off the four lane road through the hamlet onto a new expressway bypass west of the community. A project at the cost of $66.3 million, the construction would involve a full interchange for exit 98, replacing the former at-grade intersection. The plans would involve the acquisition of eight local bungalow buildings and no residents would be required to give up property via eminent domain for construction. They would also work on upgrading the shores of the Little Beaver Kill and the former alignment of the NYO&W. New access points for fishermen would be installed as well. The alignment of Route 17 would be reduced from four lanes to two, reuniting two sides of the community that had been split by Route 17.

The bypass cost climbed to $95 million by the time construction began on Spring 2009. The NYSDOT approved contractor began demolishing trees and using blast materials to blow up a new alignment for Route 17. Unlike the higher pomp and circumstance around the May 2007 announcement, by October 2010, the community began to suffer from a financial perspective. Because of the blasting and the dust, local residents began to move away from Parksville and some of them had reported structural damage to their houses. The owner of the Mobil gas station in Parksville had reported that revenues had dropped compared to prior to the beginning of construction. Local business owners, including those who were members of the Parksville Priorities Committee, stated that they did not want the bypass to kill Parksville like Route 17 once had when it was constructed east of Main Street.

The new bypass opened in the autumn of 2011, leading to further decline for local businesses. The owner of the local Mobil station stated that he had suffered a loss of over three-quarters of his business in May 2012 compared to May 2011 when traffic still went through Parksville. By June 2012, construction was underway to remove the four lane alignment of Route 17 and build the new two-lane alignment along with a new parking lot. Other local businesses considered not even opening for the summer 2012 season, noting the major downturn in traffic after the bypass opened. Not every business complained about construction, with a local hotel owner suggesting that business had been in good shape and that they wished NYSDOT put more effort in developing a park for Parksville.

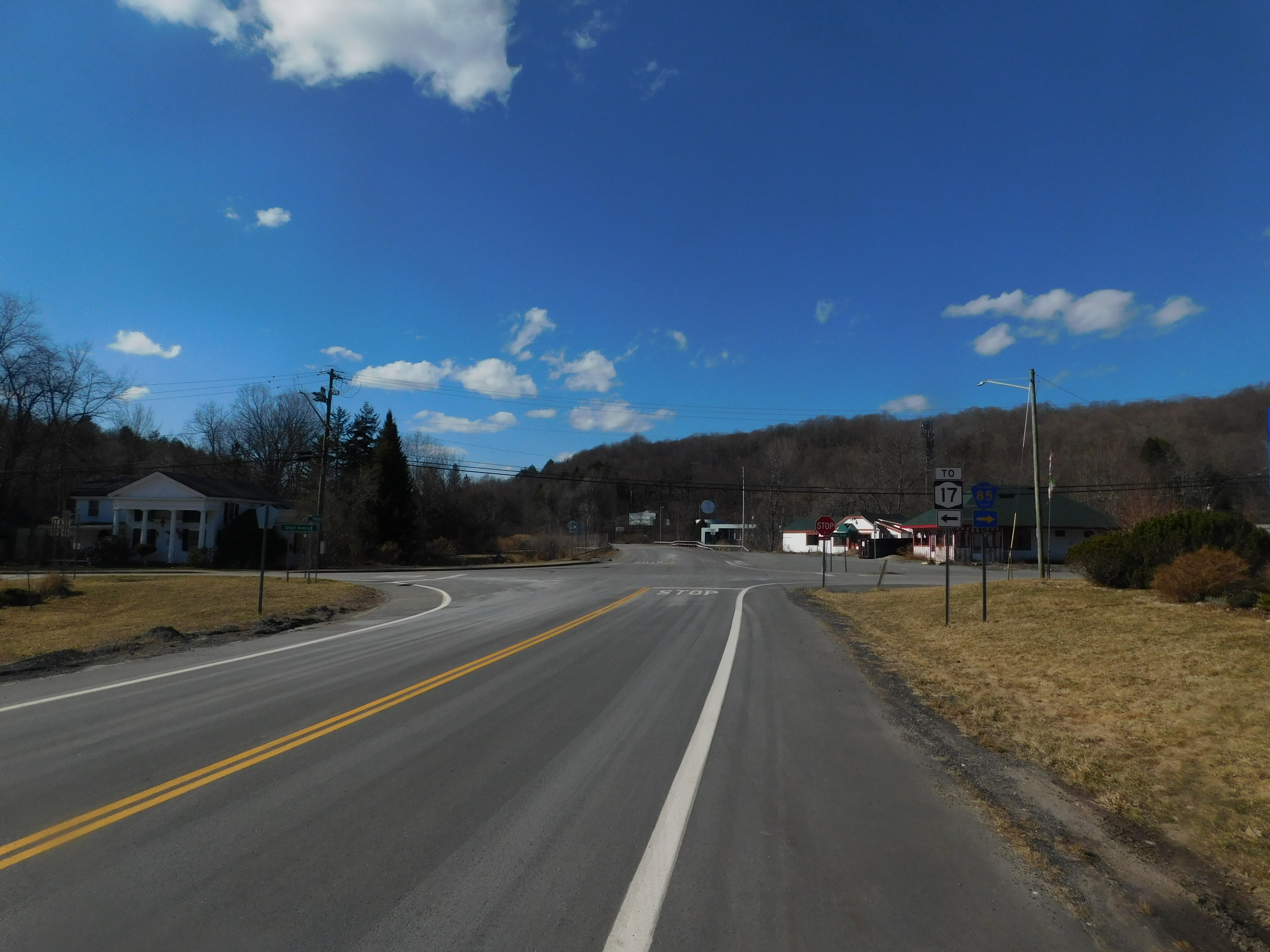
Parksville's former exit 98 interchange in March 2024

By 2020, the majority of storefronts in Parksville were empty, though some local entrepreneurs were willing to take a shot on the community.

=== Post-bypass history ===
The town of Liberty announced in September 2025 that the Borscht Belt Historical Marker Project would install a new marker in Parksville at the junction of Parksville Road and Short Avenue to commemorate the influence the Borscht Belt had on the area. A ceremony would be held on October 5, 2025. This new marker would also note the decline in the community with the construction of Route 17 and the African-American influence in the area.
