= Arthur Dong =

American filmmaker

- Chinese: 曾奕田
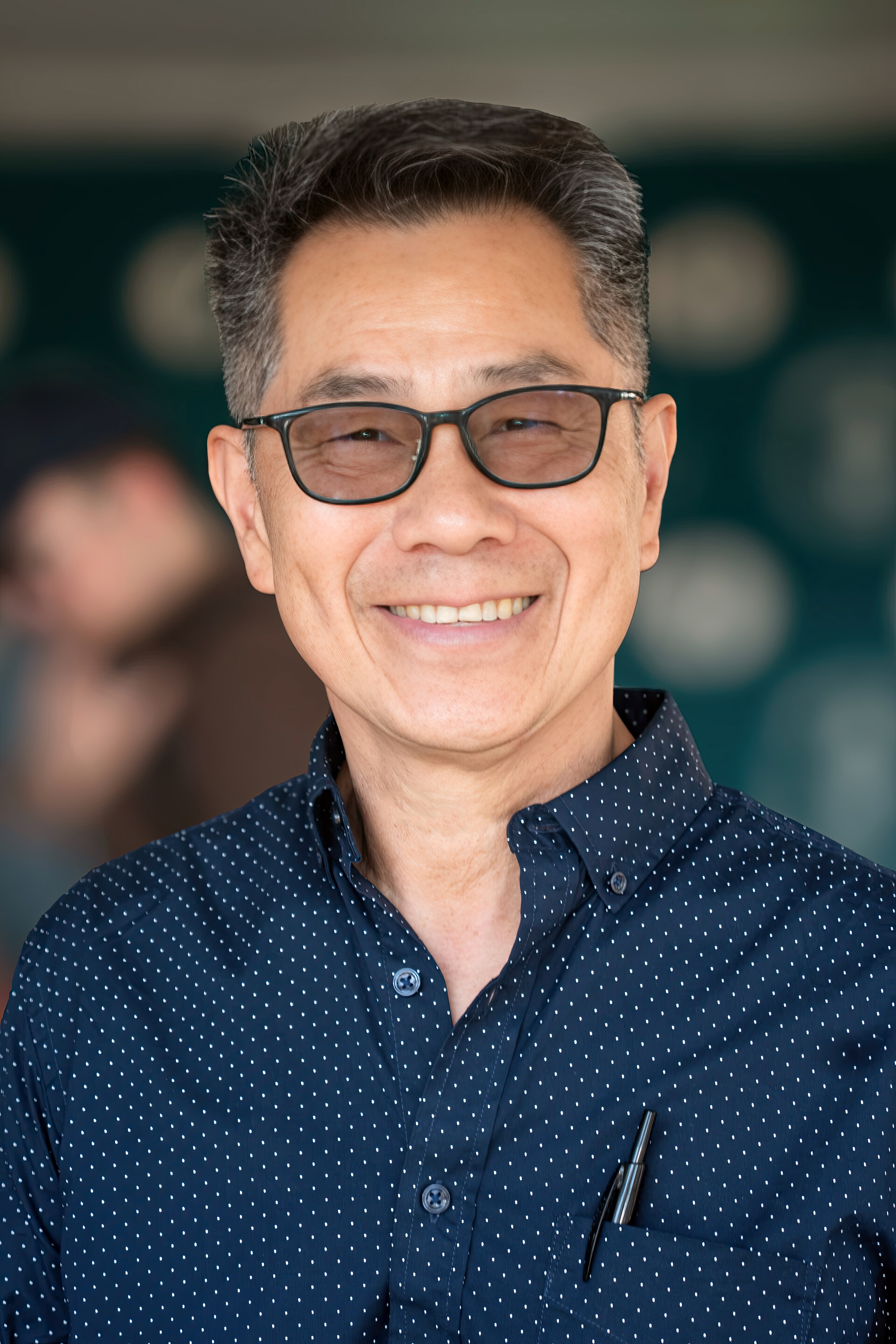
- Arthur Dong at the Los Angeles Times Festival of Books, 2026
- Born: October 30, 1953 (age 72); San Francisco, California, US
- Education: San Francisco State University
- Occupations: Filmmaker, author, curator
- Website: www.deepfocusproductions.com

Arthur Dong is an American filmmaker, author, and curator whose work focuses on Asian American and LGBTQ themes. He explores representation, identity, social justice, and American media and culture.

== Early life and education ==
Dong was born on October 30, 1953, in San Francisco, California. He graduated from Galileo High School in 1971. He received a BA in film from San Francisco State University and a Directing Fellow Certificate from the American Film Institute Center for Advanced Film Studies. In 2007, San Francisco State University named him Alumnus of the Year.

== Film and television ==
Dong's early film Public (1970), an animated Super-8 work exploring societal norms and violence, produced while he was a student at Galileo High School in San Francisco, won first prize at the California High School Film Festival. In 1982, Dong founded DeepFocus Productions, Inc. to distribute his film Sewing Woman (1982), about his mother’s immigration from China to the United States. Narrated by Lisa Lu, it was nominated for an Academy Award for Best Documentary Short Subject.

He later directed Forbidden City, U.S.A. (1989), about San Francisco Chinatown nightclubs, and Coming Out Under Fire (1994), which examines U.S. military policy toward gay and lesbian service members during World War II.

Other films include Licensed to Kill (1997), which addresses anti-gay violence in the United States, Family Fundamentals (2002), a study of conservative Christian families with LGBT children, Hollywood Chinese (2007), on the history of Chinese representation in American cinema, and The Killing Fields of Dr. Haing S. Ngor (2015), which documents the life of Cambodian genocide survivor and Oscar-winning actor, Dr. Haing S. Ngor.

Dong has also worked in television as an associate producer for KGO-TV in San Francisco and as a producer at KCET in Los Angeles. From 1991-1992, he produced eleven documentaries for the Life & Times series at KCET, including Straight Hate, which profiled community activists combating anti-gay violence in Long Beach, California. He produced and directed Out Rage ’69 (1995), about the Stonewall Riots, as part of the PBS series The Question of Equality.

In 2024, Kino Lorber released The Arthur Dong Collection, a three-disc Blu-ray box set featuring ten of his films, starting with Public (1970).

== Books ==
Dong is the author of Forbidden City USA: Chinatown Nightclubs, 1936-1970 (paperback, 2014; hardcover, 2015), with a foreword by Lisa See. He is also the author of Hollywood Chinese: The Chinese in American Feature Films (2019), with a foreword by Randy Haberkamp and an afterword by Janet Yang.

== Curatorial and academic work ==
Dong has curated exhibitions on Chinese American cinema history, including Hollywood Chinese: The Arthur Dong Collection at the Chinese American Museum in Los Angeles. He curated the exhibition Hollywood Chinese at the Formosa Cafe, a long-term installation featuring materials from his archival collection on the history of Chinese Americans in Hollywood. At the Jewett Gallery of the San Francisco Main Library, he curated Forbidden City, USA: Chinese American Nightclubs, 1936-1970, an exhibition based on his documentary and collection of ephemera covering the Chinatown nightclub scene in World War II San Francisco.

He has also curated film programs for the Academy Museum of Motion Pictures and the Criterion Channel.

Dong has participated as an advisor in Sundance Documentary Film Program workshops held in Beijing in collaboration with CNEX. He has also served as Distinguished Professor in Film at Loyola Marymount University.

== Professional affiliations ==
Dong is a member of the Academy of Motion Picture Arts and Sciences and served on its Board of Governors from 2002 to 2006, representing the Documentary Branch. As a member of the Documentary Branch Executive Committee, Dong was among the early advocates for the branch and contributed to its establishment prior to its official recognition by the Academy in 2001. He has served on the Academy Museum of Motion Pictures’s Inclusion Advisory Committee from 2017 to 2025, and the boards of Film Independent (formerly the Independent Film Project/West), the National Film Preservation Board, and Outfest (formerly the Gay and Lesbian Media Coalition). During his tenure on the National Film Preservation Board as a representative of the Academy of Motion Picture Arts and Sciences, Dong nominated The Curse of Quon Gwon (1917) and Flower Drum Song (1961) for inclusion in the National Film Registry. The films were added to the registry in 2006 and 2008, respectively.

== Filmography ==
- Public (1970)
- Sewing Woman (1982)
- Lotus (1987)
- Forbidden City, U.S.A. (1989)
- Claiming a Voice: The Visual Communications Story (1990)
- Coming Out Under Fire (1994)
- The Question of Equality (1995)
- Licensed to Kill (1997)
- Family Fundamentals (2002)
- Hollywood Chinese (2007)
- The Killing Fields of Dr. Haing S. Ngor (2015)

== Awards and recognition ==
Dong’s film awards include an Academy Award for Best Documentary Short Subject nomination for Sewing Woman (1982) and a Peabody Award for Coming Out Under Fire (1994). The latter also received the Teddy Award for Best Documentary at the Berlin International Film Festival and the GLAAD Media Award for Outstanding Documentary. Hollywood Chinese (2007) won Taiwan's Golden Horse Award for Best Documentary. Licensed to Kill (1997) received two awards at the Sundance Film Festival, the Documentary Directing Award and the Filmmakers Trophy.

His films have received nominations for the News & Documentary Emmy Awards, including Outstanding Director for Licensed to Kill (1997) in 1998 and Outstanding Interview/Interviewer for Coming Out Under Fire (1994) in 1995.

Hollywood Chinese (2007) aired as an episode of PBS's American Masters during the 2008-2009 season, which won the Primetime Emmy Award for Outstanding Documentary or Nonfiction Series that year.

For the 1993 Los Angeles Area Emmy Awards, Dong received three nominations for his Life & Times documentaries at KCET: Dust of Life, which examined the plight of Amerasians from the Vietnam War; Echoes in the Grid, a profile of Gordon Davidson and the Mark Taper Forum; and the two-part special on the 1992 Los Angeles riots, Exit King Blvd. and Return to King Blvd., for which Dong was one of six producers.

At the 1996 GLAAD Media Awards, The Question of Equality, a four-part documentary series on the history of the LGBTQ rights movement that premiered with Dong's Out Rage ’69 episode, won the Outstanding Television Documentary award.

Dong's first book, Forbidden City USA: Chinatown Nightclubs, 1936-1970 (2014, 2015), received the American Book Award and the Independent Publisher’s Regional Non-Fiction Silver Award. His follow-up book, Hollywood Chinese: The Chinese in American Feature Films (2019), received the Asian/Pacific American Award for Literature and was selected one of "13 Smart Must-Read Books on Race and Hate" by the Advocate.

Dong has received community honors including the Los Angeles Pride Community Pioneer Award (2016), LGBT History Month Icon (2015), and CAAMFest Spotlight (2015). The Chinese American Museum awarded him the Historymakers Award in Arts and Entertainment in 2008, which “honors extraordinary individuals who have made a significant impact or contribution towards the advancement of the Chinese American community and beyond.”

Retrospectives of his films have been presented by the Walker Art Center, Outfest, the Hawaii International Film Festival, the Criterion Channel, and others.

He is also a recipient of a Guggenheim Fellowship in film (2000) and two Rockefeller Media Arts Fellowships (1995, 2006).
