= GLAAD Media Award for Outstanding Documentary =

Annual award for LGBTQ documentary films

- Awarded for: Outstanding depiction of the LGBT (lesbian, gay, bisexual, and transgender) community and topics in a documentary
- Country: United States
- Presented by: GLAAD
- First award: 1990; 36 years ago
- Currently held by: Come See Me in the Good Light (2026)

The GLAAD Media Award for Outstanding Documentary is an annual award that honors documentaries for excellence in the treatment of LGBT (lesbian, gay, bisexual, and transgender) individuals, history, and themes. It is one of several categories of the annual GLAAD Media Awards, which are presented by GLAAD—an American non-governmental media monitoring organization—at ceremonies held primarily in New York City and Los Angeles between March and May.

The award is one of the few to date back to the 1st GLAAD Media Awards in 1990, where it was given to Common Threads: Stories from the Quilt. While no documentary was recognized in 1991 or 1993, the award has been present at every ceremony since the 5th GLAAD Media Awards in 1994. It has been jointly awarded on four occasions, having been given to two documentaries in 1995 and 2014, and three in 1996 and 2024.

For a documentary to be eligible, it must either receive a theatrical release or air on television in more than one local market. Documentaries receiving a theatrical release must be distributed by a recognized film distribution company and play for paid admission for seven consecutive days, while televised ones must air on television within two years of completion. The award is given to the documentary and may be accepted by any of the producers, directors, or individuals featured in the documentary. Documentaries selected by GLAAD are evaluated based on four criteria: "Fair, Accurate, and Inclusive Representations" of the LGBT community, "Boldness and Originality" of the project, significant "Impact" on mainstream culture, and "Overall Quality" of the project. GLAAD monitors mainstream media to identify which documentaries will be nominated, while also issuing a call for entries that encourages media outlets to submit documentaries for consideration. By contrast, in order for documentaries created by and for LGBT audiences to be considered for nomination, they must be submitted after the call for entries. Winners are determined by a plurality vote by GLAAD staff and its board, Shareholders Circle members, (Note: The Shareholders Circle consists of individuals who have made a donation of $1,500 or more.) volunteers and affiliated individuals.

Since its inception, the award has been given to 39 documentaries. The only television programs to have been nominated twice are MTV's The Real World and True Life, both of which won once. The Real World won for its third season The Real World: San Francisco in 1995, and True Life for the episode "I'm Gay and I'm Getting Married" in 2005. At the 35th GLAAD Media Awards in 2024, the award was given to Beyond the Aggressives: 25 Years Later, Kokomo City, and The Stroll.

== Winners and nominees ==
Table key
‡	Indicates the winner

=== 1990s ===
1990s winners and nominees
Award year	Documentary	Distributor / Network	Ref(s).
1990 (1st)	Common Threads: Stories from the Quilt ‡	Direct Cinema	
1992 (3rd)	Paris Is Burning ‡	Off-White Productions / Prestige Pictures	
1994 (5th)	Forbidden Love: The Unashamed Stories of Lesbian Lives ‡	Women Make Movies	
1995 (6th)	Coming Out Under Fire ‡	Deep Focus Films	
1995 (6th)	The Real World: San Francisco ‡	MTV	
1996 (7th)	Ballot Measure 9 ‡	Sovereign Distribution	
1996 (7th)	The Celluloid Closet ‡	Sony Pictures Classics	
1996 (7th)	The Question of Equality ‡	PBS	
1997 (8th)	It's Elementary: Talking About Gay Issues in School ‡	New Day Films	
1998 (9th)	Paul Monette: The Brink of Summer's End ‡	Cinemax	
1998 (9th)	Behind the Music: "Boy George"	VH1	
1998 (9th)	Hide and Seek	PBS	
1998 (9th)	I Shall Not Be Removed: The Life of Marlon Riggs	PBS	
1998 (9th)	Licensed to Kill		
1999 (10th)	Out of the Past ‡	PBS	
1999 (10th)	The Brandon Teena Story	Zeitgeist Films	
1999 (10th)	Dear Jesse	Cowboy Pictures	
1999 (10th)	The Real Ellen Story	Bravo	
1999 (10th)	San Francisco Neighborhoods: The Castro	PBS	

=== 2000s ===
2000s winners and nominees
Award year	Documentary	Distributor / Network	Ref(s).
2000 (11th)	Out at Work ‡	HBO	
2000 (11th)	After Stonewall	First Run Features	
2000 (11th)	E! True Hollywood Story: "Divine"	E!	
2000 (11th)	Golden Threads	PBS	
2000 (11th)	The Man Who Drove with Mandela		
2001 (12th)	Living with Pride: Ruth Ellis @ 100 ‡	Sundance Channel	
2001 (12th)	Creature	Seventh Art Releasing	
2001 (12th)	Our House	PBS	
2001 (12th)	The Real World: New Orleans	MTV	
2001 (12th)	You Don't Know Dick	Sundance Channel	
2002 (13th)	Scout's Honor ‡	PBS	
2002 (13th)	5 Girls	PBS	
2002 (13th)	American High	PBS	
2002 (13th)	Keep the River on Your Right: A Modern Cannibal Tale	IFC Films	
2002 (13th)	Paragraph 175	HBO	
2003 (14th)	Trembling Before G-d ‡	New Yorker Films	
2003 (14th)	Gay Weddings	Bravo	
2003 (14th)	Middle School Confessions	HBO	
2003 (14th)	Southern Comfort	HBO	
2003 (14th)	True Life: "I'm Coming Out"	MTV	
2004 (15th)	Brother Outsider: The Life of Bayard Rustin ‡	PBS	
2004 (15th)	A Boy Named Sue	Showtime	
2004 (15th)	Daddy & Papa	PBS	
2004 (15th)	Hope Along the Wind: The Life of Harry Hay	PBS	
2004 (15th)	School's Out: The Life of a Gay High School in Texas	MTV	
2005 (16th)	True Life: "I'm Gay and I'm Getting Married" ‡	MTV	
2005 (16th)	No Secret Anymore: The Times of Del Martin and Phyllis Lyon	Sundance Channel	
2005 (16th)	The Opposite Sex: Rene's Story	Showtime	
2005 (16th)	Paternal Instinct	Cinemax	
2005 (16th)	Tarnation	Wellspring Media	
2006 (17th)	TransGeneration ‡	Sundance Channel / Logo	
2006 (17th)	American Experience: Kinsey	PBS	
2006 (17th)	Middle Sexes: Redefining He and She	HBO	
2006 (17th)	Same Sex America	Showtime	
2006 (17th)	We Are Dad	Showtime	
2007 (18th)	All Aboard! Rosie's Family Cruise ‡	HBO	
2007 (18th)	Billie Jean King: Portrait of a Pioneer	HBO	
2007 (18th)	My Mums Used to be Men	BBC America	
2007 (18th)	One Punk Under God	Sundance Channel	
2007 (18th)	This Film Is Not Yet Rated	IFC Films	
2008 (19th)	For the Bible Tells Me So ‡	First Run Features	
2008 (19th)	Camp Out	Logo	
2008 (19th)	Cruel and Unusual: Transgender Women in Prison	We TV	
2008 (19th)	Freddie Mercury: Magic Remixed	VH1 / Logo	
2008 (19th)	Small Town Gay Bar	Logo	
2009 (20th)	A Jihad for Love ‡	First Run Features	
2009 (20th)	Chris & Don. A Love Story	Zeitgeist Films	
2009 (20th)	Freeheld	Cinemax	
2009 (20th)	Saving Marriage	Regent Releasing	
2009 (20th)	Sex Change Hospital	We TV	

=== 2010s ===
2010s winners and nominees
Award year	Documentary	Distributor / Network	Ref(s).
2010 (21st)	Ask Not ‡	PBS	
2010 (21st)	Be Like Others	HBO	
2010 (21st)	Derek	Sundance Channel	
2010 (21st)	The Topp Twins: Untouchable Girls	Diva Productions	
2010 (21st)	U People	Logo	
2011 (22nd)	8: The Mormon Proposition ‡	Red Flag Releasing	
2011 (22nd)	Edie & Thea: A Very Long Engagement	Sundance Channel	
2011 (22nd)	Out. The Glenn Burke Story	Comcast SportsNet Bay Area	
2011 (22nd)	Prodigal Sons	First Run Features	
2011 (22nd)	Unsung: "Sylvester"	TV One	
2012 (23rd)	Becoming Chaz ‡	Oprah Winfrey Network	
2012 (23rd)	The Strange History of Don't Ask, Don't Tell	HBO	
2012 (23rd)	Two Spirits	PBS	
2012 (23rd)	We Were Here	Red Flag Releasing	
2012 (23rd)	The World's Worst Place to be Gay?	Logo	
2013 (24th)	How to Survive a Plague ‡	Sundance Selects	
2013 (24th)	Codebreaker	TODpix	
2013 (24th)	Hit So Hard	Variance Films	
2013 (24th)	Vito	HBO	
2013 (24th)	Wish Me Away	First Run Features	
2014 (25th)	Bridegroom ‡	Virgil Films / Oprah Winfrey Network	
2014 (25th)	Call Me Kuchu ‡	Cinedigm	
2014 (25th)	God Loves Uganda	Variance Films	
2014 (25th)	The New Black	Promised Land Films	
2014 (25th)	Valentine Road	HBO	
2015 (26th)	L Word Mississippi: Hate the Sin ‡	Showtime	
2015 (26th)	The Case Against 8	HBO	
2015 (26th)	Laverne Cox Presents: The T Word	Logo / MTV	
2015 (26th)	To Russia with Love	Epix	
2015 (26th)	True Trans with Laura Jane Grace	AOL Originals	
2016 (27th)	Kumu Hina ‡	PBS	
2016 (27th)	Limited Partnership	PBS	
2016 (27th)	Mala Mala	Strand Releasing	
2016 (27th)	Tab Hunter Confidential	The Film Collaborative	
2016 (27th)	Tig	Netflix	
2017 (28th)	Southwest of Salem: The Story of the San Antonio Four ‡	Investigation Discovery	
2017 (28th)	Mapplethorpe: Look at the Pictures	HBO	
2017 (28th)	Out of Iraq	Logo	
2017 (28th)	The Same Difference	Centric	
2017 (28th)	The Trans List	HBO	
2018 (29th)	Gender Revolution: A Journey with Katie Couric ‡	National Geographic	
2018 (29th)	Chavela	Music Box Films	
2018 (29th)	Independent Lens: "Real Boy"	PBS	
2018 (29th)	Kiki	Sundance Selects	
2018 (29th)	This is Everything: Gigi Gorgeous	YouTube Red	
2019 (30th)	Believer ‡	HBO	
2019 (30th)	Calling Her Ganda	Breaking Glass Pictures	
2019 (30th)	My House	Viceland	
2019 (30th)	Quiet Heroes	Logo	
2019 (30th)	When the Beat Drops	Logo	

=== 2020s ===
2020s winners and nominees
Award year	Documentary	Distributor / Network	Ref(s).
2020 (31st)	State of Pride ‡	YouTube	
2020 (31st)	5B	RYOT	
2020 (31st)	Gay Chorus Deep South	MTV	
2020 (31st)	Leitis in Waiting	PBS	
2020 (31st)	Wig	HBO	
2021 (32nd)	Disclosure ‡	Netflix	
2021 (32nd)	Circus of Books	Netflix	
2021 (32nd)	Equal	HBO Max	
2021 (32nd)	For They Know Not What They Do	First Run Features	
2021 (32nd)	Howard	Disney+	
2021 (32nd)	Mucho Mucho Amor: The Legend of Walter Mercado	Netflix	
2021 (32nd)	Scream, Queen! My Nightmare on Elm Street	Virgil Films / Shudder	
2021 (32nd)	Visible: Out on Television	Apple TV+	
2021 (32nd)	We Are the Radical Monarchs	POV / PBS	
2021 (32nd)	Welcome to Chechnya	HBO	
2022 (33rd)	Changing the Game ‡	Hulu	
2022 (33rd)	Cured	PBS / Independent Lens	
2022 (33rd)	Flee	Neon	
2022 (33rd)	The Lady and the Dale	HBO	
2022 (33rd)	The Legend of the Underground	HBO	
2022 (33rd)	No Ordinary Man	Oscilloscope Laboratories	
2022 (33rd)	Nuclear Family	HBO	
2022 (33rd)	Pier Kids	PBS / POV	
2022 (33rd)	Pray Away	Netflix	
2022 (33rd)	Pride	FX	
2023 (34th)	Framing Agnes ‡	Kino Lorber	
2023 (34th)	All the Beauty and the Bloodshed	HBO	
2023 (34th)	The Andy Warhol Diaries	Netflix	
2023 (34th)	The Book of Queer	Discovery+	
2023 (34th)	Mama's Boy	HBO	
2023 (34th)	Maurice Hines: Bring Them Back	Starz	
2023 (34th)	Mormon No More	Hulu	
2023 (34th)	Queer for Fear	Shudder	
2023 (34th)	Sirens	Oscilloscope	
2023 (34th)	Stay on Board: The Leo Baker Story	Netflix	
2024 (35th)	Beyond the Aggressives: 25 Years Later ‡	MTV Documentary Films	
2024 (35th)	Kokomo City ‡	Magnolia Pictures	
2024 (35th)	The Stroll ‡	HBO	
2024 (35th)	Eldorado: Everything the Nazis Hate	Netflix	
2024 (35th)	Every Body	Focus Features	
2024 (35th)	Little Richard: I Am Everything	Magnolia Pictures	
2024 (35th)	Orlando, My Political Biography	Janus Films	
2024 (35th)	Rainbow Rishta	Amazon Prime Video	
2024 (35th)	Rock Hudson: All That Heaven Allowed	HBO Documentary Films	
2024 (35th)	POV: "UYRA – The Rising Forest"	PBS	
2025 (36th)	Will & Harper ‡	Netflix	
2025 (36th)	Independent Lens: "Breaking the News"	PBS	
2025 (36th)	Photographer: "Campbell Addy"	National Geographic	
2025 (36th)	Chasing Chasing Amy	Level 33 Entertainment	
2025 (36th)	Down in the Valley	Starz	
2025 (36th)	Hidden Master: The Legacy of George Platt Lynes	Greenwich Entertainment	
2025 (36th)	POV: "Hummingbirds"	PBS	
2025 (36th)	Lil Nax X: Long Live Montero	HBO	
2025 (36th)	Outstanding: A Comedy Revolution	Netflix	
2025 (36th)	POV: "Who I am Not"	PBS	
2026 (37th)	Come See Me in the Good Light ‡	Apple TV	
2026 (37th)	Amy Bradley Is Missing	Netflix	
2026 (37th)	Enigma	HBO	
2026 (37th)	Heightened Scrutiny	Fourth Act Film	
2026 (37th)	I'm Your Venus	Netflix	
2026 (37th)	In Transit	Prime Video	
2026 (37th)	Love & Rage: Munroe Bergdorf	Peacock	
2026 (37th)	POV: "A Mother Apart"	PBS	
2026 (37th)	Pee-Wee as Himself	HBO	
2026 (37th)	Sally	National Geographic	
