= We Are Dad =

2005 American documentary film

- Directed by: Michel Horvat
- Produced by: Michel Horvat
- Starring: Roger Croteau; Steven Lofton; Rosie O'Donnell; Margaret Fischl; Judith Stacey
- Cinematography: Michel Horvat
- Edited by: Michel Horvat
- Production company: Tavroh Films Inc.
- Distributed by: Indie-Pictures
- Release dates: March 5, 2005 (United States); June 19, 2005 (Worldwide)
- Running time: 68 minutes
- Country: United States
- Language: English

We Are Dad is a 2005 documentary film produced, directed, filmed, and edited by Michel Horvat that depicts the family of the Lofton-Croteaus and their attempts to adopt their foster son, Bert. The film was released after the Supreme Court of the United States refused to hear the case Lofton v. Secretary of the Department of Children & Family Services, filed by the American Civil Liberties Union on behalf of the Lofton-Croteaus and other same-sex couples, which sought to overturn the 1977 ban on same-sex adoption in Florida.

== Synopsis ==
We Are Dad follows the daily activities of Steven Lofton and Roger Croteau, pediatric nurses in the AIDS unit and life partners, in raising their family of five children. Three of the children are foster children under the purview of the State of Florida, and two were adopted in the State of Oregon. Four of the children are HIV-positive.

The film focuses on the issue of both Lofton's and Croteau's inability to adopt their foster children under the existing statutes of the State of Florida. (Note: The Florida Third District Court of Appeal found that the 1977 statute was unconstitutional in September 2010. Governor Charlie Crist ordered that enforcement of the statute cease. In October 2010, Attorney General Bill McCollum stated that Florida would not appeal the decision. See In re Gill for further information.) The film juxtaposes scenes of daily life in the Lofton-Croteau household with soundbites from both supporters of their case, Lofton v. Secretary of the Department of Children & Family Services, such as Rosie O'Donnell; licensed professionals and experts, such as Margaret Fischl and Judith Stacey; and those who oppose LGBTQ rights, including Randy Ball, Paul Cameron, and then-president of the Family Research Institute, Kenneth L. Connor.

== Background ==
In 1988, both men underwent training to become foster parents and were given custody of three HIV-positive children between the ages of six months and one year. The State required Lofton to quit his job and stay home full time to care for the children's medical needs. In 1991, Bert was placed with them, and in 1994, Bert seroreverted. In 1998, the Children's Home Society created an award for "outstanding foster parent of the year," which they named the Lofton-Croteau Award, giving the inaugural honor to Lofton and Croteau. Lofton and Croteau were granted permission by the State to move to Oregon, and in 2001, received a letter from Florida stating that the State intended to look for another family for Bert. The State of Florida had placed him with Lofton and Croteau as foster parents because, as a child with HIV, he had been considered "unadoptable."

The film's release followed SCOTUS' refusal to hear the case Lofton v. Secretary of the Department of Children & Family Services on January 10, 2005. Brought by the ACLU on behalf of several homosexual foster parents wishing to adopt in Florida, the case concerned a statute passed in 1977 that followed a campaign to suppress gay rights by overturning a Miami ordinance led by Anita Bryant, which then led to the formation of Save Our Children and the passage of the aforementioned statute. The 1977 statute specifically prohibited homosexual or bisexual persons from adopting children in the state. On August 30, 2001, Judge James Lawrence King declared the 1977 Florida ban to be constitutional. (Note: The law was repealed through new legislation in 2015 which was signed into law by Governor Rick Scott, though he encouraged legislators to pass a law that would allow faith-based organizations to deny adoption rights to potential LGBTQ parents.)

Media coverage of the case, specifically in the Miami Herald, prompted Rosie O'Donnell to contact the ACLU in September 2001. In March 2002, O'Donnell announced her lesbianism, specifically citing the Lofton-Croteau household's struggle over adopting in Florida as a reason for doing so. O'Donnell helped publicize the ACLU website LetHimStay.com, which helped spread the message regarding the Lofton-Croteau case and how Governor Jeb Bush's administration had reclassified Bert as "adoptable" because of his seroreversion.

== Cast ==
Listed alphabetically, all as self:

- Randy Ball, speaking as the representative for the 29th district in the Florida State Legislature
- Ron Brenesky, speaking for the Republican Unity Coalition, Miami chapter
- Devon Brooks, professor at the University of Southern California School of Social Work
- Paul Cameron, speaking for the Family Research Institute
- Richard Cardran
- Matthew Coles, lead counsel for the American Civil Liberties Union
- Kenneth L. Connor, speaking for the Family Research Institute
- Roger Croteau
- John Davidson, lead counsel in Lawrence v. Texas
- Ginger Delgado
- Margaret Fischl, director of the University of Miami's AIDS Clinical Research Unit
- Martin Luther King Jr.
- Bob Kunst
- Joan Lofton
- Steven Lofton
- Ben Lopez, speaking for the Traditional Values Coalition, Anaheim chapter
- Sophia Loren
- Rosie O'Donnell
- Judith Stacey

== Production ==
Michel Horvat produced, directed, filmed, and edited We Are Dad, which received a US$7,000 production grant from the Pacific Pioneer Fund through the Independent Documentary Association. The documentary was filmed over four years. It was produced through Tavroh Films and distributed by Indie-Pictures.

Pacific Soundwaves of Santa Monica, California handled the digital post-production for the film.

== Themes ==
The film focuses on same-sex adoption, specifically in the State of Florida. In addition to Florida's adoption law itself, the movie addresses the tense relationship Lofton and Croteau had with the State.

== Release ==
We Are Dad premiered at the fifteenth annual Cinequest Film & Creativity Festival on March 5, 2005. It screened at the Miami Gay and Lesbian Film Festival on April 30, 2005. The film screened at the New York Lesbian, Gay, Bisexual, & Transgender Film Festival on June 12, 2005.

As an official selection of the Frameline Film Festival, it played at the Roxie Theater the morning of June 19, 2005, then premiered to wider audiences on Showtime at 7:00 PM.

It continued to screen at film festivals both domestically and internationally throughout 2005 and 2006. In July 2005 at the Philadelphia International Gay and Lesbian Film Festival, Outfest, and at the Dublin Lesbian and Gay Film Festival. In August, at Outflix in Memphis, Tennessee. In October, at the Austin Gay and Lesbian International Film Festival the Mount Shasta International Film Festival, and at the Seattle Queer Film Festival. In November at the Spokane GLBT Film Festival, DIVERSA in Argentina, and at LesGaiCineMad in Madrid.

In January 2006, it screened at Zinegoak. In February, at the OutFar! Film Festival in Phoenix. In April 2006, at The Egyptian Theatre in Hollywood, sponsored by Outfest, and as part of the seventeenth annual Boybutante Ball, playing at the 40 Watt Club, with proceeds benefiting AIDS Athens. In May, at the Northeast Kingdom Rainbow Festival in St. Johnsbury, Vermont. In November, at the IMAX theatre in Winnipeg's annual Reel Pride film festival.

We Are Dad screened at the Society Against Sexual Orientation Discrimination's festival on June 8, 2007.

It screened in La Serena, Chile in October 2009.

In 2020, Frameline included We Are Dad in a series of AIDS-related documentaries streamed online for free at the beginning of July.

== Home media ==
We Are Dad was released on DVD on June 27, 2006 at MSRP US$24.95. Special features included a family photo album, a featurette titled "Fun with Fundies," and twenty minutes of bonus footage.

== Critical reception ==
=== Contemporary reviews ===
Sandy Wolf for Cinequest appreciated the inclusion of the multiple points of view on gay parenting, saying that the presentation was both "infuriating and inspirational." Erik Schut for the Philadelphia International Gay and Lesbian Film Festival called the film "remarkable," noting that it conveys true "family values."

Michelle McCarthy, writing for The Advocate, stated that the documentary shows how "chilling" the arguments from conservative commentators are, and how those critiques are inapplicable when juxtaposed with images of the Lofton-Croteau family.

Darwin Porter agreed with an online review that noted the hypocrisy of Florida's "self-righteous, irrational, and paranoid" Department of Children and Families. Kevin Thomas of the Los Angeles Times was impressed with Horvat's inclusion of interviews with professionally trained sociologists and psychologists who concurred that no evidence exists that same-sex couples are "unsuitable parents" and how they were juxtaposed against the counter-argument, calling the documentary "ahead of its time."

=== Retrospective reviews ===
The website Gay Dads Australia, writing about the documentary in 2009, noted that the Lofton-Croteau family "is full of joy, laughter, the bustle of activity, and a well-honed sense of irony."

Linda L. Layne, writing at the beginning of her tenure as a visiting fellow for the Reproductive Sociology Research Group at the University of Cambridge, found the film to be "poorly constructed." Layne felt that the inclusion of so many clips for opponents of same-sex parenting was unwarranted. Layne's review included six other films as well, and of the whole, she claimed that the households presented by the documentaries were atypical of same-sex parents in that the subjects were highly educated, lived on either the eastern or western coast of the United States, and were in the middle or upper middle classes.

== Accolades ==
We Are Dad tied with Wetback: The Undocumented Documentary at Cinequest for the Best Feature Documentary award. The documentary received the Programmer's Award at the 11th annual Philadelphia International Gay and Lesbian Film Festival, and the Audience Award for Best Documentary at Outflix 2005. It also received the Audience Award at the Spokane GLBT Film Festival in November 2005.

The documentary was nominated for the GLAAD Media Award for Outstanding Documentary in 2006. It received the Best Documentary Award at Zinegoak in January 2006.

It was listed as a "Notable Video for Adults" in 2007 by Booklist.

Accolades
Date	Event	Award	Recipient	Result	Ref.
March 2005	Cinequest Film & Creativity Festival	Best Feature Documentary	We Are Dad	Won – tie	
July 2005	Philadelphia International Gay and Lesbian Film Festival	Programmer's Award	We Are Dad	Won	
August 2005	Outflix Film Festival	Audience Award for Best Documentary	We Are Dad	Won	
November 2005	Spokane GLBT Film Festival	Audience Award	We Are Dad	Won	
2006	17th GLAAD Media Awards	GLAAD Media Award for Outstanding Documentary	We Are Dad	Nominated	
January 2006	Zinegoak	Best Documentary	We Are Dad	Won	

== See also ==
- 2005 in film

== Sources ==
- "10° Festival Internacional de cine lesbico y gai de Madrid: 3 al 13 de noviembre de 2005" [10th International Gay and Lesbian Film Festival in Madrid: November 3-13, 2005] (PDF). LesGaiCineMad (in Spanish). 2005. Archived from the original (PDF) on September 14, 2018.
- "11th Circuit Court of Appeals Upholds Florida's Anti-Gay Adoption Law". The Gayzette. January 9, 2004. p. 9. JSTOR community.36618715.
- "2005 Festival Films: We Are Dad". Mount Shasta International Film Festival. 2005. Archived from the original on May 18, 2006.
- "2006 OutFar! Film Festival Schedule". OutFar! Film Festival. 2006. Archived from the original on January 13, 2006.
- "Catamount Arts to host the Northeast Kingdom Rainbow Film Festival May 5–11". Stanstead Journal. Vol. 160, no. 38. April 26, 2006. p. 7 – via Google Books.
- "Cinequest 15 Wraps" (PDF). Cinequest (Press release). March 14, 2005. p. 2. Archived from the original (PDF) on August 25, 2006.
- "Cinequest in Brief: A critical guide to the documentaries and features at this year's Cinequest". Metro Silicon Valley. March 2, 2005.
- "Daily Schedule 2005". DIVERSA. 2005.
- "Father's Day". A&U: America's AIDS Magazine. June 2005. JSTOR community.41885539.
- "film". San Francisco Bay Guardian. Vol. 39, no. 37. June 15, 2005. p. 82 – via Internet Archive.
- "Form 990-PR for period ending June 2005". ProPublica. June 2005.
- "Gay Adoption in America". ABC News. March 14, 2002.
- "How many colors make us Queer?". Stonewall News NW. October 2005. Archived from the original on January 4, 2007.
- "Library and Resources". Gay Dads Australia. June 15, 2009. Archived from the original on July 15, 2009.
- "Notable Videos for Adults, 2007". Booklist. Vol. 103, no. 13. March 1, 2007. pp. 35–6. Gale A161023630.
- "Outflix Film Festival 2005". Outflix Film Festival. 2005. Archived from the original on August 18, 2019.
- "Philadelphia International Gay and Lesbian Film Festival Ends 2005 with Awards, Celebrations". Philadelphia International Gay and Lesbian Film Festival. July 22, 2005. Archived from the original on December 1, 2005.
- "Program Schedule: April 22 to May 1". Miami Gay and Lesbian Film Festival. April 2005. Archived from the original on April 19, 2005.
- "Seattle Queer Film Festival Schedule" (PDF). Seattle Queer Film Festival. 2005. Archived from the original (PDF) on July 7, 2008.
- "Showtime Honors Dads with Special Father's Day Programs on Sunday, June 19". The Futon Critic (Press release). May 31, 2005. Archived from the original on June 27, 2026.
- "Spokane's GLBT Film Festival: Audience Awards". Spokane GLBT Film Fest. 2005. Archived from the original on July 13, 2006.
- "Spokane's GLBT Film Festival: Program". Spokane GLBT Film Fest. 2005. Archived from the original on July 14, 2006.
- "We Are Dad". Frameline Film Festival. 2005.
- "We Are Dad". New York Lesbian, Gay, Bisexual, & Transgender Film Festival. 2005. Archived from the original on February 19, 2006.
- "We Are Dad premieres on DVD June 27". The Advocate. June 26, 2006.
- "We are family". The Irish Times. July 22, 2005. Archived from the original on June 24, 2026.
- "Wedding Banquet leads off SASOD festival this week". The Scene. Stabroek News. Vol. 21, no. 153. June 1, 2007. p. 2C – via Google Books.
- "Weekly Planner Mar. 30–Apr. 5". Backstage. Vol. 13, no. 13. March 30, 2006. p. 5. Gale A145222237.
- Alan, Ariel (October 5, 2009). "Chile: Primer ciclo de cine lésbico, gay, bisexual y transexual en La Serena" [Chile: First lesbian, gay, bisexual, and transsexual cinema series in La Serena]. Universo Gay (in Spanish). Archived from the original on October 7, 2009.
- Ball, Carlos A. (2012). The Right to Be Parents: LGBT Families and the Transformation of Parenthood. New York: New York University Press. ISBN 978-0-8147-3930-3. LCCN 2011045382.
- Bell, Diana (March 26, 2002). "Rosie's coming out – is this really for the kids?". The Liberty Champion. Vol. 19, no. 17. p. 4. JSTOR community.32207495.
- Bell, Maya (October 24, 2018) [January 11, 2005]. "Justices Let Ban Stand on Gay Adoption". Orlando Sentinel. Archived from the original on October 30, 2023.
- Biggs, Cheryl (May 15, 2006). "Coming soon: upcoming independent DVD offerings". Video Business. Vol. 26, no. 20. pp. 27–8. Gale A146061602.
- Canedy, Dana (March 15, 2002). "Groups Fight Florida's Ban on Gay Adoptions". New York Times. Archived from the original on May 27, 2015.
- Clark, Samantha (May 1, 2006). "New releases: key data for ordering product". Video Business. Vol. 26, no. 18. Gale A145528444.
- Cubillo, Igor (January 22, 2006). "El filme francés 'Le clan' se impone en el festival Zinegoak de cine gay" [The French film 'Le clan' triumphs at the Zinegoak gay film festival]. El País (in Spanish).
- Farrington, Brendan (June 13, 2015) [11 June 2015]. "Gay adoption ban stricken from Florida laws after four decades". LGBTQ Nation. Archived from the original on June 15, 2015.
- Fox, Michael (June 16, 2005). "We Are Dad". Frameline29 – via Issuu.
- Garcia, Chris (September 29, 2005). "Film by UT alum, BC series kick off festival". Austin American-Statesman. p. 40. Gale A136851807.
- Gillmor, Alison (November 7, 2006). "Documentaries front, centre at gay and lesbian film festival". Winnipeg Free Press. p. d4. Gale A153973607.
- Glassman, Anthony (January 14, 2005). "Supreme Court allows Florida adoption ban to stand". Gay People's Chronicle.
- Grayson, Matthew (April 13, 2006). "Drag show benefits AIDS, HIV". The Red and the Black. p. 7B – via Digital Library of Georgia.
- Grigorovicius, Mantas (Summer 2024). "Resurrection of State-Sponsored Bans on Gay Adoption and Violation of Children's Rights" (PDF). Southern California Review of Law and Social Justice. 33 (3): 321–388.
- Grossman, Joanna (January 12, 2005). "Why The U.S. Supreme Court Should Have Chosen to Review A Florida Gay Adoption Case: The Law At Issue Was Invidious, and the Case Offered a Chance to Clarify a Key Precedent". FindLaw.
- Herman, Ellen (2008). Kinship By Design: A History of Adoption in the Modern United States. Chicago: University of Chicago Press. ISBN 978-0-226-32760-0. LCCN 2008002077. OCLC 733307178.
- Kaufmann, Debra (November 11, 2005). "The list". The Hollywood Reporter. Vol. 391, no. 40. pp. P14–P22. Gale A139337441.
- Layne, Linda (November 7, 2017) [October 14, 2017]. "Documenting gay dads: seven documentaries about gay fatherhood in North America". Reproductive BioMedicine and Society Online (5): 31–34. doi:10.1016/j.rbms.2017.10.001. ISSN 2405-6618. PMC 5952833. PMID 29774272.
- Malmgren, Jeanne (June 20, 2006) [March 14, 2002]. "Gay Adoption in Florida // It's out of the question". Tampa Bay Times. Archived from the original on February 23, 2024.
- Marcus, Lawrence (January 24, 2006). "GLAAD hands out noms". Variety. Archived from the original on June 28, 2017.
- Mariner, Joanne (February 2, 2004). "Anita Bryant Lives: Florida's Continuing Assault on Gay Adoption". FindLaw.
- McCarthy, Michelle (June 21, 2005). "They are dad". The Advocate. pp. 158–9. ISSN 0001-8996 – via Google Books.
- McDonough, Kevin (June 18, 2005). "'Cut' follows stars at Pebble Beach". The Spokesman-Review. United Feature Syndicate. p. E4. ISSN 1064-7317.
- Moore, Margaret (April 5, 2006). "Out There!". Flagpole Magazine. Vol. 20, no. 3. pp. 12–15. ProQuest 229879976. Archived (PDF) from the original on June 24, 2026 – via Digital Library of Georgia.
- Parker, Ray (April 30, 2002). "Fighting to keep a family; one of the gay dads Rosie O'Donnell says inspired her to come out talks about the couple's ongoing fight to adopt their foster children". Behind the Headlines. The Advocate – via TheFreeLibrary.
- Porter, Darwin; Prince, Danforth (2006). Blood Moon's Guide to Gay and Lesbian Film. United States: Blood Moon Productions, Ltd. ISBN 9780974811840. OCLC 69732785 – via Internet Archive.
- Provenzano, Jim (July 3, 2020). "Frameline44 screens AIDS-themed films online". Bay Area Reporter. Archived from the original on June 24, 2026.
- Ramos, Victor Manuel (August 6, 2021) [October 22, 2010]. "Florida won't challenge end to gay adoption ban". Orlando Sentinel. Archived from the original on May 8, 2023.
- Rothaus, Steve (March 13, 2002). "Rosie O'Donnell fights gay adoption ban in Florida". Chron.com.
- Scheer, Robert (March 19, 2002). "Kids Get Left in the Lurch When the 'Values' Cops Arrive". Los Angeles Times. Archived from the original on June 27, 2026.
- Schut, Erik (2005). "We Are Dad (review)". Philadelphia International Gay and Lesbian Film Festival. Archived from the original on May 5, 2006.
- Schwartz, John (September 22, 2010). "Florida Court Calls Ban on Gay Adoptions Unlawful". New York Times. Archived from the original on September 23, 2010.
- Sioco, Maria Carmela (November 2009). "What Makes a Family?: A Closer Look at Gay Adoption". Children's Voice. Vol. 18, no. 6. pp. 18–23. eISSN 1930-868X. ISSN 1057-736X. JSTOR 45389527.
- Thomas, Kevin (July 14, 2005). "Unusual attraction and angst: Outfest features, documentaries focus on family dynamics". Los Angeles Times. ProQuest 2185353602.
- Tusan, Cary; Siegel, L.M., eds. (2010). The Filmmaker's Guide to Distribution: Hollywood Distribution Directory 2010. Los Angeles: The Hollywood Reporter and Nielsen Business Media. ISBN 9781928936732 – via Internet Archive.
- Usborne, David (March 16, 2002). "Florida turmoil over campaign to repeal same-sex adoption ban". The Independent.
- Webster, Dan (November 4, 2005). "GLBT Film Festival explores everyday experiences". The Spokesman-Review. p. 26. Archived from the original on January 4, 2007.
- Wildman, Sarah (October 9, 2001). "Preventing parenting: a federal judge upholds Florida's ban on adoptions by gays". The Advocate – via TheFreeLibrary.
- Wolf, Sandy (2005). "We Are Dad (review)". Cinequest Film & Creativity Festival.
