= Aaron Pike =

Aaron Pike may refer to:

- Aaron Pike (activist) (born 1981), American same-sex marriage activist
- Aaron Pike (athlete) (born 1986), American Paralympic athlete
- Aaron Pike (golfer) (born 1985), Australian professional golfer
