= CRDL =

CRDL may refer to:

- Canberra Roller Derby League, a Canberra-based roller derby league
- Team CRDL, a group of characters from RWBY
- Civil Rights Digital Library, an initiative to promote understanding of racial equality (see Digital Library of Georgia)
