= 17th GLAAD Media Awards =

Annual US media awards ceremony

17th Annual GLAAD Media Awards (2006) were presented at four separate ceremonies: March 27 in New York City; April 8 at the Kodak Theatre in Los Angeles; May 25 in Miami; and June 10 in San Francisco. The awards honor films, television shows, musicians and works of journalism that fairly, accurately and inclusively represent the LGBT community and issues relevant to the community.

== Special Recognition ==
- Vito Russo Award: David LaChapelle
- Vanguard Award: Charlize Theron
- Golden Gate Award: Jennifer Tilly
- Davidson/Valentini Award: Ron Cowen
- Stephen F. Kolzak Award: Melissa Etheridge
- Valentia Award: Fey
- Pioneer Award: Rev. Cecil Williams
- Visibilidad Award: Richard Pérez-Feria
- Special Recognition: "First Day of My Life," Bright Eyes music video, dir. John Cameron Mitchell

== Winners and nominees ==
Winners are presented in bold.

- Outstanding Film - Wide Release
  - **Brokeback Mountain** (Focus Features)
  - Capote (Sony Pictures Classics)
  - The Family Stone (20th Century Fox)
  - Kiss Kiss Bang Bang (Warner Bros.)
  - Rent (Sony Pictures)
- Outstanding Film - Limited Release
  - Beautiful Boxer (Regent Releasing/here! Films)
  - Mysterious Skin (Strand Releasing/Antidote Films)
  - Saving Face (Sony Pictures Classics)
  - **Transamerica** (The Weinstein Company)
  - Walk on Water (Samuel Goldwyn Films)
- Outstanding Documentary
  - American Experience: Kinsey (PBS)
  - Middle Sexes: Redefining He and She (HBO)
  - Same Sex America (Showtime)
  - **TransGeneration** (The Sundance Channel/Logo)
  - We Are Dad (Showtime)
- Outstanding Drama Series
  - Commander in Chief (ABC)
  - **The L Word** (Showtime)
  - Queer as Folk (Showtime)
  - Six Feet Under (HBO)
  - South of Nowhere (The N)
- Outstanding Comedy Series
  - Out of Practice (CBS)
  - Shameless (BBC America)
  - **Will & Grace** (NBC)
- Outstanding Individual Episode (in a series without a regular gay character)
  - "Alien" - Law & Order: SVU (NBC)
  - **"Best Friends" - Cold Case** (CBS)
  - **"Pilot" - My Name is Earl** (NBC)
  - "Someone's in the Kitchen with Daddy" - What I Like About You (The WB)
  - "Transitions" - Without a Trace (CBS)
- Outstanding Television Movie or Mini-Series
  - **The Long Firm** (BBC America)
  - Partner(s) (Lifetime)
- Outstanding Reality Program
  - The Amazing Race 7 (CBS)
  - America's Next Top Model 5 (UPN)
  - "Boone Luffey/Gillespie" - Wife Swap (ABC)
  - Queer Eye (Bravo)
  - **"Straight/Gay" - 30 Days** (FX)
- Outstanding Daily Drama
  - General Hospital (ABC)
  - **Passions** (NBC)
- Outstanding Talk Show Episode
  - "Fighting for My Children" - Dr. Phil
  - "Twins: Identical But Different" - The Montel Williams Show
  - **"When I Knew I Was Gay" - The Oprah Winfrey Show**
  - "When Your Identical Twin Has a Sex Change" - The Oprah Winfrey Show
- Outstanding TV Journalism - Newsmagazine
  - "Becoming Diane" - 20/20 (ABC)
  - **"Gay Rodeo" - Only in America** (Discovery Times Channel)
  - "Lady Lions: Alleged Discrimination" - Outside the Lines (ESPN)
  - "Lucky" - Dateline NBC (NBC)
  - "The Mirror" - Nightline (ABC)
- Outstanding TV Journalism - News Segment
  - **"Andrew Goldstein" - ESPN SportsCenter** (ESPN)
  - "Coming Out" - Live From... (CNN)
  - "Peter Hams" - ESPN SportsCenter (ESPN)
  - "School Outing" - Anderson Cooper 360° (CNN)
  - "Secret Sex Lives" - Anderson Cooper 360° (CNN)
- Outstanding Newspaper Article
  - "A House Divided" by Laura Bond (Westword)
  - "The New Radical" by Kim Martineau (The Hartford Courant)
  - "Paradise Lost" by Michelle Boorstein (The Washington Post)
  - **"The Stewards of Gay Washington" by Anne Hull** (The Washington Post)
  - "When an Employee Switches Gender, What's a Company to Do?" by Stephanie Armour (USA Today)
- Outstanding Newspaper Columnist
  - Marta Donayre (El Observador)
  - Margery Eagan (Boston Herald)
  - Mark Morford (San Francisco Chronicle)
  - Andy Praschak (The San Juan Star)
  - **Deb Price** (The Detroit News)
- Outstanding Newspaper Overall Coverage
  - San Francisco Chronicle
  - Seattle Post-Intelligencer
  - **USA Today**
  - The Washington Post
  - Wisconsin State-Journal
- Outstanding Magazine Article
  - "A Down Low Dirty Shame" by Joshunda Sanders (Bitch)
  - "For the Soul of the Church" by Ethan Vesely-Flad (Color Lines)
  - "The Gay Rodeo Rides Again" by Michael Joseph Gross (Details)
  - **"The Murder of a Boy Named Gwen" by Bob Moser** (Rolling Stone)
  - "What's in a Name?" by Beth Greenfield (Time Out New York)
- Outstanding Magazine Overall Coverage
  - AsianWeek
  - **Newsweek**
  - People
  - Time
  - Time Out New York
- Outstanding Digital Journalism Article
  - "Debajo del Arcoiris" by Emily Alpert (IntheFray.com)
  - "Gender Outlaws" by Emily Alpert (IntheFray.com)
  - "The Lowdown on the Downlow" by Bruce Dixon (BlackCommentator.com)
  - "Now I Get to be Like Everybody Else" by Greg Garber (ESPN.com)
  - **"Turning Off Gays" by Mark Benjamin** (Salon.com)
- Outstanding Music Artist
  - Antony and the Johnsons, I Am a Bird Now
  - **Melissa Etheridge, Greatest Hits: The Road Less Traveled**
  - Girlyman, Little Star
  - Sharon Isbin, Rodrigo, Villa-Lobos, Ponce: Guitar Concertos
  - Amy Ray, Prom
- Outstanding Comic Book
  - Gotham Central by Greg Rucka and Ed Brubaker (DC Comics)
  - Strangers in Paradise by Terry Moore (Abstract Studio)
  - Top Ten: The Forty-Niners by Alan Moore (ABC Comics/Wildstorm)
  - Y: The Last Man by Brian K. Vaughn (Vertigo/DC Comics)
  - **Young Avengers by Allan Heinberg** (Marvel)
- Outstanding Advertising - Electronic
  - "Cupid" - MTV
  - **"Guy Watcher" - Diet Pepsi**
  - "New Boyfriend" - Orbitz
  - "Signs" - mtvU
- Outstanding Advertising - Print
  - "Partnership Registry" - ABC Carpet and Home
  - "So What's Cooking in the Kitchen?" - GE Monogram
  - **"There's One." - American Express**
- Outstanding Los Angeles Theater
  - Bunbury by Tom Jacobson
  - **I Am My Own Wife by Doug Wright**
  - Porcelain by Chay Yew
  - A Pebble in My Shoe: The Life and Times of John Shelby Spong by Colin Cox
  - Pera Palas by Sinan Unel
- Outstanding New York Theater: Broadway & Off-Broadway
  - Border/Clash: A Litany of Desire by Staceyann Chin
  - The Color Purple book by Marsha Norman, based on the novel by Alice Walker
  - Ghetto Superstar (The Man That I Am) by Billy Porter
  - **Oedipus at Palm Springs by The Five Lesbian Brothers**
  - Swimming in the Shallows by Adam Bock
- Outstanding New York Theater: Off-Off-Broadway
  - Busted Jesus Comix by David Johnston
  - Christine Jorgensen Reveals created by Bradford Louryk
  - Dress Suits to Hire by Holly Hughes in collaboration with Peggy Shaw and Lois Weaver
  - Golden Age by Roberto Aguirre-Sacasa
  - **The Lightning Field by David Ozanich**
