= My House (2018 TV series) =

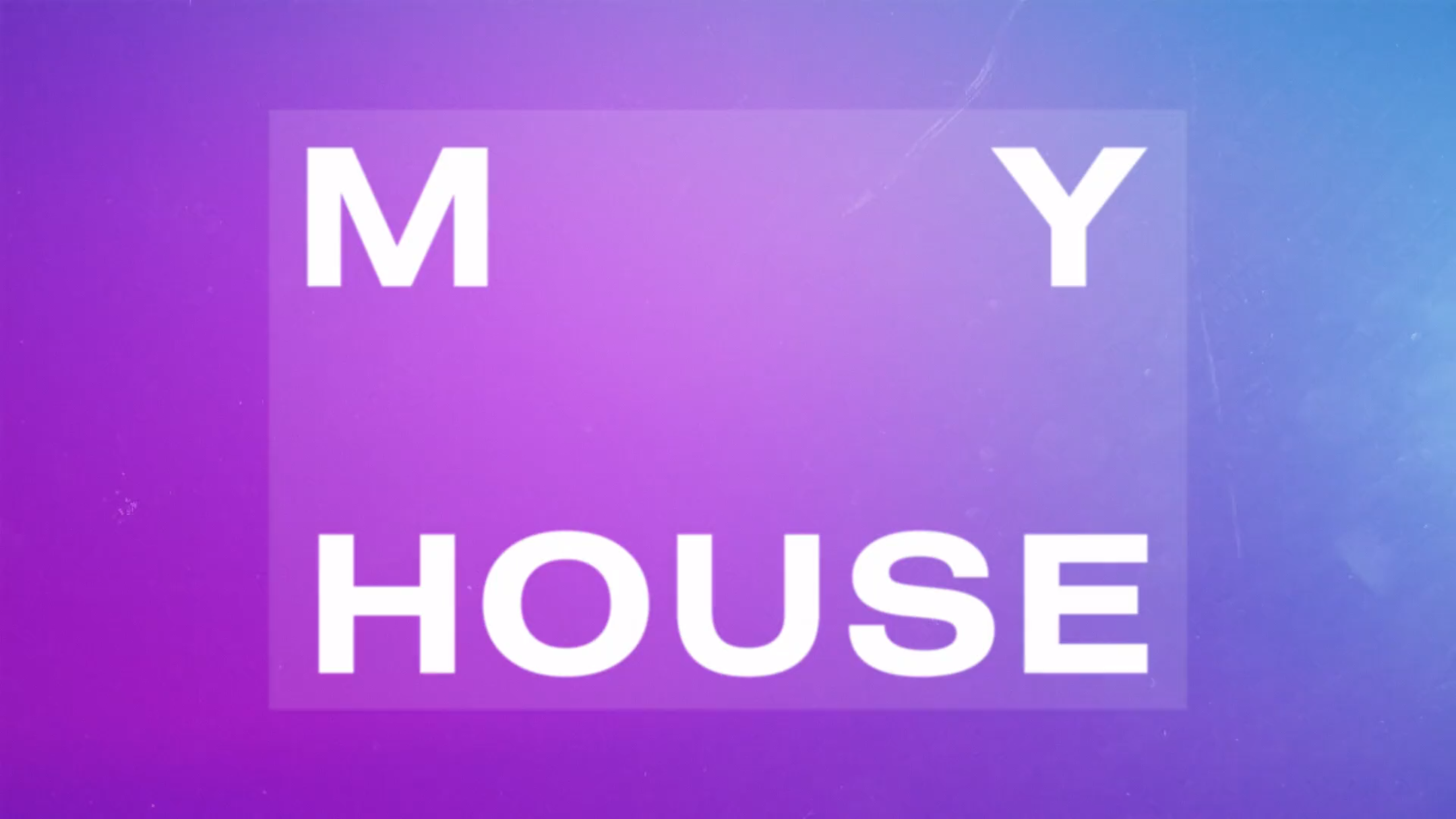
- Genre: Reality series; Docuseries
- Starring: Alex Mugler; Brielle "Tati" Rheames; Jelani Mizrahi; Lolita Balenciaga; Precious Ramirez; Relish
- Theme music composer: Byrell the Great; Precious Ramirez
- Country of origin: United States
- Original language: English
- No. of seasons: 1
- No. of episodes: 10

Production
- Executive producers: Sean David Johnson; Elegance Bratton; Dale Dobson; Nomi Ernst Leidner; Shane Smith; Eddy Moretti; Spike Jonze
- Producers: Field producer; Nneka Onuorah; Senior producer; Giselle Bailey
- Cinematography: Carrie Cheek
- Editors: Adam Wills; Kathryn Hood-Moore; Chris O'Coin; Joaquin Perez; Tat Ho Yee
- Running time: 22 minutes

Original release
- Network: Viceland
- Release: April 25 – June 27, 2018

My House is a documentary/reality series focusing on ball culture in New York City. It follows Tati 007, Alex Mugler, Jelani Mizrahi, Lolita Balenciaga, Relish Milan and the commentator Precious Ebony. The first of ten episodes premiered on Viceland on April 25, 2018.

== Episodes ==
No.	Title	Original release date
1	Coldest Winter Ever	April 25, 2018
2	#TeamTati	May 2, 2018
3	Old Way	May 9, 2018
4	Ballroom and Beyond	May 16, 2018
5	Thug Realness	May 23, 2018
6	C.R.E.A.M.	May 30, 2018
7	Guns and Roses	June 6, 2018
8	D.M.S.R. (Dance, Music, Sex, Romance)	June 13, 2018
9	American Realness	June 20, 2018
10	Female Figures	June 27, 2018

== Distribution ==
My House began airing in France on Viceland via Canal+ on September 9, 2018. The episodes were all uploaded to YouTube in fall 2019.

== Reception ==
Entertainment Tonight listed the premiere among its "obsessions" for the week and called the series "essential viewing" before Pose. The New York Times "Watching" newsletter said it "will vogue its way into your heart". In 2018, it won the MIPCOM Diversify TV's Excellence Award for Representation of LGBTQ in the Non-Scripted category over Channel 4's Genderquake and RTÉ's My Trans Life. The show was nominated in the category for Outstanding Documentary for the 30th GLAAD Media Awards.

== See also ==
- List of programs broadcast by Viceland
- List of reality television programs with LGBT cast members
