= Pier Kids =

- Directed by: Elegance Bratton
- Production company: Freedom Principle
- Release date: July 2019 (Outfest)
- Running time: 96 minutes
- Country: United States
- Language: English
- Budget: $150,000

Pier Kids is a 2019 American documentary film first shown at Outfest 2019. The film follows three young queer and transgender New Yorkers who frequent the Christopher Street Pier in Manhattan. The film was directed by Elegance Bratton. The film premiered on POV on PBS on August 2, 2021.

== Plot ==
Pier Kids explores the lives of Black, homeless queer and trans youth who call the Christopher Street Pier in NYC their home. It was filmed over five years, taking place mainly in 2011, 2012, and three years later in 2016. The youth are interviewed over these years to show how time and experience changes. The movie shines a light on how queer people of color utilize spaces to create a chosen family, as well as highlights the police presence in a community that relies on sex work for their main form of income.

== Distribution ==
The movie premiered in Los Angeles as part of Outfest 2019. It was later acquired by PBS' documentary series POV to start showing August 2, 2021.

== Reception ==
Henry Giardina of Into says "These stories aren't easy to watch, but Pier Kids must be seen." Eric Langberg of Queer Review says "Sometimes the film's stark portrayal of sex work, fear of HIV, and general life on the street is reminiscent of Larry Clark's Kids, except Pier Kids doesn't sensationalize a single moment or use any of it for shock value the way the fictionalized Kids did."

=== Accolades ===
Year	Award	Category	Recipient(s)	Result	Ref.
2022	GLAAD Media Awards	Outstanding Documentary	Pier Kids	Nominated	
