= Elegance Bratton =

American filmmaker and photographer

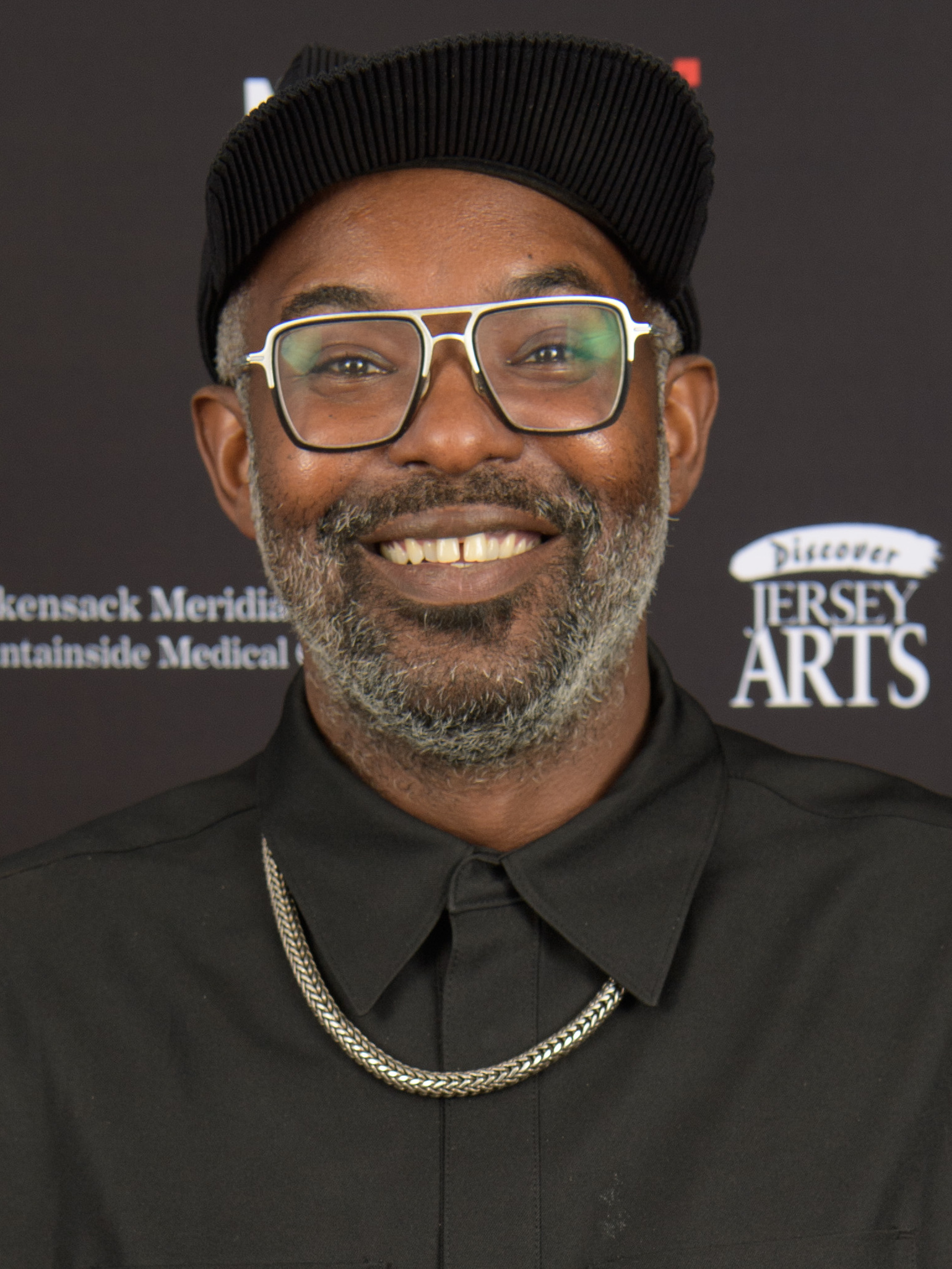
- Bratton at the 2022 Montclair Film Festival
- Born: May 3, 1979 (age 47); Jersey City, New Jersey, U.S.
- Education: Columbia University (BA); New York University (MFA)
- Occupations: Director, writer, producer, photographer
- Years active: 2014–present
- Spouse: Chester Algernal Gordon

Elegance Bratton (born May 3, 1979) is an American filmmaker and photographer. He began his career in the 2010s, writing, directing, and producing a variety of projects including the short film Walk for Me, the reality television series My House, and the documentary film Pier Kids.

Bratton's feature film directorial debut, The Inspection, premiered at the 2022 Toronto International Film Festival and was released by A24 that November.

== Early life ==
Elegance was born in Jersey City, New Jersey and raised in Phillipsburg, New Jersey. At age 16, he was kicked out of his home for being gay and spent 10 years being homeless before joining the Marines. After completing his boot camp, he served as a combat camera production specialist in Camp H. M. Smith in Hawaii, shooting videos and taking photographs for the Marines and after serving for six years was honorably discharged. He went on to graduate from Columbia University with a degree in African American studies, and received his MFA from New York University Tisch School of the Arts for directing and writing.

== Career ==
Bratton has worked as a director, writer, producer, and photographer since the early 2010s. His photographic compilation Bound by Night was shortlisted for the Kassel 2014 photo-book award.

In 2016, he directed a short film, Walk for Me, as an assignment in his second year in the filmmaking program at Tisch. The film is about trans motherhood in ballroom culture. Walk for Me was released on the Criterion Channel years later.

In 2018, Bratton directed the documentary film, Pier Kids, about three LGBTQ homeless youths in New York City; the film was released in 2019, and has been featured in various media outlets, such as the VICE, ABC News, The Huffington Post, OUT Magazine, and GLAAD.

In 2021, Bratton received the Film Independent Truer Than Fiction Spirit Award, which honors emerging directors of non-fiction features.

Bratton's feature film directorial debut, titled The Inspection, was announced in April 2021 with a cast that includes Jeremy Pope, Gabrielle Union, Bokeem Woodbine, and Raúl Castillo, with Gamechanger Films set to produce, and A24 set to produce and distribute. Bratton also wrote the screenplay. The film had its world premiere at the 2022 Toronto International Film Festival on September 8, 2022. It also screened at the 60th New York Film Festival on October 14, 2022, the Austin Film Festival on October 29, 2022, before being released theatrically in the United States on November 18, 2022 by A24.

In 2025, Bratton directed Move Ya Body: The Birth of House a documentary revolving around Disco Demolition Night and the beginnings of House music, which had its world premiere at the 2025 Sundance Film Festival.

== Filmography ==
Short film

Year	Title	Director	Writer	Producer
2016	Walk for Me	Yes	Yes	Yes
2017	Life After	No	No	Yes
2018	Ina nyo	No	No	Yes
2018	Fran This Summer	No	No	Yes
2018	Tadpole	No	No	Yes
2020	Buck	Yes	Yes	Yes

Documentary

Year	Title	Director	Writer	Producer	Notes
2018	My House	Yes	Yes	Yes	TV series
2019	Pier Kids	Yes	Yes	Yes	
2025	Move Ya Body: The Birth of House	Yes	No	No	

Feature film

Year	Title	Director	Writer
2022	The Inspection	Yes	Yes
2026	By Any Means	Yes	No

== Accolades ==
In 2022, Bratton was named a United States Artists (USA) Fellow. On October 22, 2022, he received the Breakthrough Director & Writer Award at the Montclair Film Festival. On January 27, 2023, Bratton was the inaugural recipient of the Coolidge Breakthrough Artist Award from Coolidge Corner Theatre.
