= Move Ya Body: The Birth of House =

2025 documentary film

- Directed by: Elegance Bratton
- Produced by: Chester Algernal Gordon
- Cinematography: Lisa Rinzler
- Edited by: Kristan William Sprague; Jeremy Stulberg
- Music by: James Newberry
- Production companies: HiddenLight Productions; One Story Up; Impact Partners; Los Angeles Media Fund; Freedom Principle
- Release date: January 26, 2025 (Sundance)
- Running time: 92 minutes
- Country: United States
- Language: English

Move Ya Body: The Birth of House is a 2025 American documentary film directed by Elegance Bratton. It follows Disco Demolition Night and the beginning of house music.

It had its world premiere at the Sundance Film Festival on January 26, 2025.

== Premise ==
In July 1979, Disco Demolition Night occurred, where records were destroyed featuring music primarily from Black artists, which led to the beginning of house music.

== Production ==
In June 2023, it was announced Elegance Bratton would direct a documentary revolving around Disco Demolition Night.

== Release ==
It had its world premiere at the Sundance Film Festival on January 26, 2025.

== Reception ==
On the review aggregator website Rotten Tomatoes, 62% of 13 critics' reviews are positive.

Lovia Gyarkye of The Hollywood Reporter wrote, "While relatively standard in execution, Move Ya Body distinguishes itself in a music doc landscape laden with artist hagiographies."
