= List of True Life episodes =

True Life, a documentary series running on MTV since March 31, 1998, has covered over 140 topics from drug use, money issues, and sexual topics to simple social behavior like visiting the Jersey Shore.

== Season 1 (1998) ==
- (1) "Fatal Dose" (03-31-1998)
- (2) "No Money, Mo' Problems" (04-07-1998)
- (3) "Freaknik" (4-14-1998)
- (4) "POV: Road Trip" (4-28-1998)
- (5) "I'm a Porn Star" (10-7-1998)
- (6) "Matthew's Murder" (11-11-1998)
- (7) "It Could Be You" (12-01-1998)

== Season 2 (1999–2000) ==
- (8) "I'm a Pro Wrestler" (8-16-1999)
- (9) "I'm a Hacker" (10-13-1999)
- (10) "I Need Sex Rx" (10-20-1999)
- (11) "I Am Driving While Black" (10-27-1999)
- (12) "I'm a Model" (11-24-1999)
- (13) "I'm a Football Hero" (1-19-2000)
- (14) "I'm on Crystal Meth" (2-9-2000)
- (15) "I'm a Star At Sundance" (2-16-2000)
- (16) "I'm the Youngest Tycoon in the World" (4-23-2000)
- (17) "I'm a Comic" (3-1-2000)
- (18) "I'm On The Runway" (3-8-2000)
- (19) "I'm Horny in Miami" (3-15-2000)
- (20) "I'm Going To Mardi Gras" (3-29-2000)
- (21) "I Live in a Brothel" (4-5-2000)
- (22) "The Travelers" (4-19-2000)

== Season 3 (2000–2003) ==
- (23) "I'm on Ecstasy" (11-30-2000)
- (24) "I'm a Backyard Wrestler" (12-3-2000)
- (25) "I'm an NFL rookie" (1-17-2001)
- (26) "I Drive Race Cars" (4-3-2001)
- (27) "I'm a Cheerleader" (4-10-2001)
- (28) "I'm a Beauty Queen" (4-17-2001)
- (29) "I Can't Breathe" (11-14-2001)
- (30) "The Aftermath of Terror" (1-2-2002)
- (31) "I'm a Private Wrestler" (1-6-2002)
- (32) "I'm a True-Life VIP" (1-8-2002)
- (33) "I'm Getting Plastic Surgery" (2-7-2002)
- (34) "I'm Coming Out" (6-27-2002)
- (35) "I Have Embarrassing Parents" (7-11-2002)
- (36) "I'm in Therapy" (7-18-2002)
- (37) "I'm Getting Married" (9-21-2002)
- (38) "I'm Going to Fat Camp" (12-7-2002)
- (39) "I'm a Heisman Trophy Candidate" (12-22-2002)
- (40) "I'm Getting Breast Implants" (12-29-2002)
- (41) "Sex2k" (1-5-2003)

== Season 4 (2003–2004) ==
- (42) "I Was Famous for 15 Minutes" (2-1-2003)
- (43) "I Have a Phobia" (2-6-2003)
- (44) "I'm Adopted" (2-13-2003)
- (45) "I've Got Baby Mama Drama" (2-20-2003)
- (46) "I Live in the Terror Zone" (2-27-2003)
- (47) "I'm a Binge Drinker" (3-6-2003)
- (48) "I'm a Gamer" (3-13-2003)
- (49) "I'm a College Baller" (3-20-2003)
- (50) "I'm Breaking Up" (3-27-2003)
- (51) "I Have an Eating Disorder" (4-3-2003)
- (52) "I'm Shipping Out" (4-10-2003)
- (53) "School's Out: The Life of a Gay High School in Texas" (4-17-2003)
- (54) "I'm Wasted" (4-24-2003)
- (55) "I'm Going to the Prom" (5-1-2003)
- (56) "First Year" (6-12-2003)
- (57) "I'm a Fanatic" (7-10-2003)
- (58) "I'm A High School Senior" (Bayonne, NJ High School and Long Beach, NY High School) (7-10-2003)
- (59) "I'm in a Wheelchair" (7-17-2003)
- (60) "I'm a Neglected Girlfriend" (7-24-2003)
- (61) "I'm Getting Divorced" (7-31-2003)
- (62) "I Want the Perfect Body" (8-7-2003)
- (63) "I'm Obsessed with My Dog" (8-14-2003)
- (64) "I'm a Street Racer" (9-4-2003)
- (65) "I Live with My Parents" (9-18-2003)
- (66) "I'm a Girlfriend (Boyfriend)" (9-25-2003)
- (67) "I'm an Urban Cheerleader" (10-2-2003)
- (68) "I'm Hooked on OxyContin" (10-16-2003)
- (69) "I'm a Little Person" (10-23-2003)
- (70) "I Have a Friend with Benefits" (11-6-2003)
- (71) "I'm a Clubber" (11-13-2003)
- (72) "I Have a Summer Share" (11-20-2003)
- (73) "I'm in the System" (1-15-2004)
- (74) "I'm an Identical Twin" (1-22-2004)
- (75) "I'm a Big Wave Surfer" (1-29-2004)
- (76) "I Live in Iraq" (2-5-2004)
- (77) "I'm on Adderall" (2-19-2004)

== Season 5 (2004) ==
- (78) "I'm Gay and I'm Getting Married" (6/24/2004)
- (79) "I'm Obese" (7/1/2004)
- (80) "I'm Surviving High School" (7/8/2004)
- (81) "I Live a Double Life" (7/15/2004)
- (82) "I'm a Muay Thai Fighter" (7/22/2004)
- (83) "I'm in an Interracial Relationship" (7/29/2004)
- (84) "I'll Do Anything for Money" (8/12/2004)
- (85) "I Live to Ride" (8/19/2004)

== Season 6 (2004) ==
- (86) "I'm Backpacking Through Europe" (10/07/2004)
- (87) "I'm a Jersey Shore Girl" (10/14/2004)
- (88) "I'm Rallying to L.A." (10/21/2004)

== Season 7 (2005) ==
- (89) "I'm on a Diet" (05/10/2005)
- (90) "I'm Dead Broke" (06/02/2005)
- (91) "I'm Moving Back in with My Parents" (06/16/2005)
- (92) "I'm Coming Home From Iraq" (06/23/2005)
- (93) "I Want the Perfect Body II" (07/07/2005)
- (94) "I'm a Battle Rapper" (07/14/2005)
- (95) "I'm a Professional Gamer" (11/20/2005)

== Season 8 (2005–2006) ==
- (96) "I'm Jealous" (12-15-2005)
- (97) "I Have Obsessive Compulsive Disorder" (12-22-2005)
- (98) "I'm a Gun Owner" (12-29-2005)
- (99) "I'm Moving to NY" (1-5-2006)
- (100) "I'm on Steroids" (1-12-2006)
- (101) "I Live on the Edge" (1-19-2006)
- (102) "I'm a Sumo Wrestler" (1-26-2006)
- (103) "I'm a Competitive eater" (3-15-2006)
- (104) "I'm on Trial by Fire" (3-22-2006)
- (105) "I'm a Reality TV Star" (3-29-2006)
- (106) "I'm Getting My Big Break" (5-4-2006)
- (107) "I Don't Fit In" (5-11-2006)
- (108) "I'm Returning to the Gulf Coast" (8-29-2006)
- (109) "I'm Addicted to Crystal Meth" (10-3-2006)
- (110) "I Have Tourette's Syndrome" (10-10-2006)
- (111) "I'm a Staten Island Girl" (10-17-2006)
- (112) "I'm a Civilian Again" (10-24-2006)
- (113) "I'm Jealous of My Sibling" (11-7-2006)
- (114) "I'm Moving to Vegas" (11-14-2006)
- (115) "I'm Out" (11/21/2006)
- (116) "I'm On Vacation" (11/28/2006)

== Season 9 (2007) ==
- (117) "I'm in an Interfaith Relationship" (1/9/2007)
- (118) "I'm Stepping" - Featuring Jessica "Remo" Saul (2/18/2007)
- (119) "I'm In Debt" (2/25/2007)
- (120) "I'm Dating Someone Older" (3/1/2007)
- (121) "I'm a Genius" (3/8/2007)
- (122) "I Have Autism" (3/15/2007)
- (123) "I Self-Injure" (3/22/2007)

== Season 10 (2007–2008) ==
- (124) "I am Celibate" (07/25/2007)
- (125) "I Live on the Border" (09/29/2007)
- (126) "I'm in a Long Distance Relationship" (09/27/2007)
- (127) "This is Me Now" (09/29/2007)
- (128) "I'm the New Kid in Town" (11/04/2007)
- (129) "I'm Supporting My Family" (11/04/2007)
- (130) "I Stutter" (11/04/2007)
- (131) "I'm Pregnant" (11/12/2007)
- (132) "I'm Having a Summer Romance" (11/19/2007)
- (133) "I Live In The Projects" (12/01/2007)
- (134) "I'm Going To Rehab" (12/01/2007)
- (135) "I'm Looking for my Father" (12/1/2007)
- (136) "I'm in an Arranged Marriage" (12/07/2007)
- (137) "I'm an Alcoholic" (01/05/2008)
- (138) "I'm the Black Sheep" (01/05/2008)
- (139) "I Panic" (01/05/2008)
- (140) "I'm Getting Out of Prison" (01/14/2008)
- (141) "I'm Happy to be Fat" (01/21/2008)
- (142) "I'm Coming to America" (02/02/2008)
- (143) "I Need Anger Management" (02/02/2008)
- (144) "I Have a Husband In Iraq" (02/02/2008)
- (145) "I work in the Sex Industry" (02/27/2008)
- (146) "A Map for Saturday" (3/1/2008)

== Season 11 (2008) ==
- (147) "I'm Going to Fashion Week" (04/05/2008)
- (148) "I'm under Peer Pressure" (04/05/2008)
- (149) "I'm a Southern Belle" (04/05/2008)
- (150) "I Have Embarrassing Parents 2" (05/15/2008)
- (151) "I Have Schizophrenia" (05/22/2008)
- (152) "I Live Another Life On the Web" (05/29/2008)
- (153) "I'm a Compulsive Shopper" (07/20/08)
- (154) "I'm Deaf" (07/20/08)
- (155) "I Don't Trust My Partner" (08/03/08)
- (156) "I Can't Stay Thin" (08/03/08)
- (157) "I'm Graduating High School" (08/20/08)
- (158) "I'm Looking For My Mother" (09/13/08)
- (159) "I Have Acne" (09/13/08)
- (160) "I'm a Single Parent" (10/05/08)
- (161) "I'm a Mixed Martial Artist" (10/05/08)
- (162) "I'm Living Off The Grid" (10/05/08)
- (163) "I'm Getting Married 2" (10/30/2008)
- (164) "I Have a Summer Share 2" (11/01/2008)
- (165) "I'm Competitive with My Best Friend" (12/06/2008)
- (166) "I'm in a Love Triangle" (11/26/2008)

== Season 12 (2009) ==
- (167) "Camp'd Out: I'm Going to Rock Camp" (1/3/2009)
- (168) "I Have Post Traumatic Stress Disorder" (1/07/2009)
- (169) "I'm Addicted To Meds" (1/14/2009)
- (170) "I'm Nuyorican" (1/25/2009)
- (171) "I'm a College Freshman" (1/31/09)
- (172) "I Can't Sleep" (2/01/2009)
- (173) "I'm a High School Freshman" (3/14/2009)
- (174) "I'm Placing My Baby for Adoption" (3/21/2009)
- (175) "I'm Eloping" (3/21/2009)
- (176) "I'm Addicted to Porn" (3/28/09)
- (177) "Camp'd Out: I'm Going to Performing Arts Camp" (4/25/2009)
- (178) "I'm Uncomfortable With My New Body" (5/2/2009)
- (179) "I Don't Like My Small Breasts" (5/2/2009)
- (180) "I'm Losing My Hair" (5/2/2009)
- (181) "I'm Stuck At Home" (5/16/2009)
- (182) "I'm Looking For My Sibling" (5/21/2009)
- (183) "I'm Bisexual" (6/6/2009)
- (184) "I Don't Like My Large Breasts" (6/6/2009)
- (185) "I'm Having Twins" (6/25/2009)
- (186) "Best and Worst Moments" (7/25/2009)
- (187) "I'm Ending My Marriage" (8/31/2009)
- (188) "I Hate My Tattoos" (9/07/2009)
- (189) "I'm Polyamorous" (9/14/2009)
- (190) "I'm Changing My Sex" (9/19/2009)
- (191) "I'm a Fanboy" (9/19/2009)
- (192) "I'm a Sports Fanatic" (9/19/2009)
- (193) "I'm Rehabbing My Injury" (9/19/2009)
- (194) "The True Adventures of True Life: 200th Episode" (9/23/2009)
- (195) "I Can No Longer Afford My Lifestyle" (10/19/09)
- (196) "I'm Clashing With My Parents" (11/15/09)
- (197) "I Have Broke Parents" (11/15/09)
- (198) "I'm Homeless" (11/15/09)
- (199) "I Can't Leave My Boyfriend" (11/16/09)

== Season 13 (2010) ==
- (200) "I'm Homeschooled" (1/9/2010)
- (201) "I'm a Gambler" (1/9/10)
- (202) "I'm Addicted to Video Games" (1/25/2010)
- (203) "I'm at a Crossroads in my Relationship" (2/1/2010)
- (204) "I'm Ex Amish" (3/8/2010)
- (205) "I Need a Transplant" (3/15/2010)
- (206) "I Have Digital Drama" (3/22/2010)
- (207) "I Have a Parent in Prison" (3/29/2010)
- (208) "I'm Relocating for Love" (4/5/2010)
- (209) "I Have Neurofibromatosis" (4/12/2010)
- (210) "I Hate My Face" (4/19/2010)
- (211) "I'm Hustling in the Hamptons" (4/26/2010)
- (212) "I Have a Traumatic Brain Injury" (5/3/2010)
- (213) "I Hate My Plastic Surgery" (5/10/2010)
- (214) "I'm a Newlywed" (5/17/2010)
- (215) "Resist the Power! Saudi Arabia" (5/24/2010)
- (216) "I Can't Have Sex" (12/6/2010)
- (217) "I Have a Paranormal Ability" (12/13/2010)
- (218) "I'm an Albino" (12/20/2010)
- (219) "I'm Addicted to Food" (12/27/2010)

== Season 14 (2011) ==
- (220) "I Have a Fetish" (1/3/2011)
- (221) "True Life Goes On: Where Are Your Favorites Now?" (1/10/2011)
- (222) "The Theriot Family: The Riot in the Bayou" (2/24/2011)
- (223) "I'm Too Young For My Boyfriend" (4/11/2011)
- (224) "I Have Too Many Siblings" (4/19/2011)
- (225) "I'm Passing As Someone I'm Not" (4/27/2011)
- (226) "I Have an Embarrassing Medical Condition" (5/3/2011)
- (227) "I'm Going To Skatopia" (5/9/2011)
- (228) "I Hate My Roommate" (6/23/2011)
- (229) "I'm Allergic To Everything" (6/23/2011)
- (230) "I Can't Get Over My First Love" (6/30/2011)
- (231) "I'm The Big Girl" (6/30/2011)
- (232) "I'm Being Sent Away By My Parents" (7/7/2011)
- (233) "I'm a Sugar Baby" (7/14/2011)
- (234) "I Want To Be Straight" (7/14/2011)
- (235) "I'm in the Marijuana Business" (7/21/2011)
- (236) "I Have Narcolepsy" (10/18/2011)
- (237) "I'm a Textaholic" (10/18/2011)
- (238) "I Have a Hot Mom" (10/25/2011) - starring Lacey Wildd
- (239) "I'm Addicted To Exercise" (11/01/2011)
- (240) "I'm Losing My Sight" (11/05/2011)
- (241) "I'm Being Cut Off By My Parents" (11/05/2011)
- (242) "I'm Occupying Wall Street" (11/05/2011)

== Season 15 (2011–2012) ==
- (243) "The Theriot Family: The Riot in the Bayou Part 2" (12/28/2011)
- (244) "On the Mat" (1/04/2012)
- (245) "I Can't Please My Parents" (1/11/2012)
- (246) "I'm A Chubby Chaser" (1/11/2012)
- (247) "I'm A Sex Offender" (1/18/2012)
- (248) "I Have Diabetes" (1/18/2012)
- (249) "I'm Addicted to Sex" (4/10/2012)
- (250) "I Live With My Ex" (4/15/2012)
- (251) "I'm Supporting My Man" (4/15/2012)
- (252) "I Have Orthorexia Nervosa" (4/15/2012)
- (253) "I'm Getting A Second Chance" (4/15/2012)
- (254) "I'm Breaking Up With My Best Friend" (5/22/2012)
- (255) "I'm Addicted to Marijuana" (6/14/2012)
- (256) "I'm Working My Way Out Of Poverty" (6/16/2012)
- (257) "I'm Addicted to Caffeine" (6/16/2012)
- (258) "I Have A New Step Parent" (6/16/2012)
- (259) "I'm Working For My Parents" (8/22/2012)
- (260) "I Work With My Ex" (8/29/2012)
- (261) "I'm Giving My Boyfriend an Ultimatum" (9/04/2012)
- (262) "I'm a Boxer in Detroit" (10/06/2012)
- (263) "I Have A Strange Habit" (10/06/2012)
- (264) "I Hate My Hair" (10/06/2012)
- (265) "I'm Addicted To Heroin" (10/06/2012)
- (266) "I'm Coming Out 2" (10/10/2012)

== Season 16 (2013) ==
- (267) "Greatest Moments Ever" (1/19/2013)
- (268) "I'm Getting Unusual Plastic Surgery" (1/19/2013)
- (269) "I'm A Bridesmaid" (1/19/2013)
- (270) "I'm A Surrogate" (1/19/2013)
- (271) "I Can't Control My Pet" (1/19/2013)
- (272) "I Hate The Government" (1/19/2013)
- (273) "I Have a High Maintenance Girlfriend" (3/5/2013)
- (274) "I'm Addicted to Tanning" (3/27/2013)
- (275) "I'm Questioning My Gender Again" (4/3/2013)
- (276) "I'm Living In My Sibling's Shadow" (4/10/2013)
- (277) "I'm Dating A Mama's Boy" (4/17/2013)
- (278) "I Need To Leave My Mom" (4/24/2013)
- (279) "I Have Social Anxiety" (5/1/2013)
- (280) "I'm Too Beautiful" (6/1/2013)
- (281) "I'm Addicted to the Internet" (6/1/2013)
- (282) "I'm Starting A Business With My Friends" (6/1/2013)
- (283) "Secrets, Lies, and Sex" (6/1/2013)
- (284) "I Hate His Bromance" (7/28/2013)
- (285) "I Have An Embarrassing Boyfriend" (7/28/2013)
- (286) "I Have A Family Who Hates My Boyfriend" (7/28/2013)
- (287) "I'm Saving Detroit" (7/28/2013)
- (288) "I'm Desperate To Have A Baby" (7/28/2013)
- (289) "True Life Presents: Bachata Nights" (10/13/2013)
- (290) "True Life Presents: My Dad Is A Bro" (10/26/2013)
- (291) "I'm Doing A Tough Mudder" (12/8/2013)
- (292) "I'm Addicted To Pills" (12/8/2013)
- (293) "I'm Famous Online" Features Miranda Sings (12/8/2013)
- (294) "Updates From the Road" (12/8/2013)

== Season 17 (2014–2015) ==
- (295) "I'm A New Millionaire" (1/4/2014)
- (296) "I'm Drunkorexic" (1/4/2014)
- (297) "I'm Preparing for the End of the World" (3/15/2014)
- (298) "I Want to be An Obscure Pageant Queen" (3/15/2014)
- (299) "I Want Respect for my Sect" (3/15/2014)
- (300) "True Life Presents: The Benjamins" (4/26/2014)
- (301) "I'm a Gay Athlete" (5/7/2014)
- (302) "I Want A Threesome" (5/14/2014)
- (303) "I'm Dating My Best Friends Ex" (5/21/2014)
- (304) "I Need To Change MY Man" (5/28/2014)
- (305) "I Want My Ex Back" (6/4/2014)
- (306) "I Have A Strange Phobia" (6/11/2014)
- (307) "My Boyfriends Fed Up With My Weight" (6/25/2014)
- (308) "True Life Presents: Crazy Young Love" (12/2/2014)
- (309) "I'm Dating My Opposite" (12/2/2014)
- (310) "I'm Being Recruited" (12/9/2014)
- (311) "I'm Hooked on Molly" (12/9/2014)
- (312) "I'm Breaking up with my Religion" (12/16/2014)
- (313) "I'm in a Forbidden Relationship" (1/5/2015)

== Season 18 (2015) ==
- (314) "I'm Being Slut Shamed" (3/30/2015)
- (315) "I Have Pushy Parents" (4/6/2015)
- (316) "I'm Obsessed with Staying Young" (4/13/2015)
- (317) "I Have Epilepsy" (4/20/2015)
- (318) "I'm the Black Sheep 2" (5/4/2015)
- (319) "Checkups and Check-ins: True Life: Update Show" (5/11/2015)
- (320) "My Parents Love Their Weed" (5/18/2015)
- (321) "I Hate My Butt" (5/25/2015)
- (322) "I'm Having Second Thoughts" (6/1/2015)
- (323) "Save My Teen Marriage" (6/8/2015)
- (324) "I'm A PC Gamer" (6/16/2015)
- (325) "I'm Going To College" (6/28/2015)
- (326) "I'm on an Extreme Diet" (9/8/2015)
- (327) "I'm Dating a Cougar" (9/16/2015)
- (328) "My Fetish is Ruining My Life" (9/29/2015)
- (329) "I'm Moving Overseas For Love" (9/29/2015)
- (330) "Hip Hop Hustlers" (11/16/2015)
- (331) "I'm Genderqueer" (11/17/2015)
- (332) "I'm Starting a Religion" (12/2/2015)
- (333) "I'm a Gay for Pay Pornstar" (12/9/2015)
- (334) "I'm Living Anime" (12/16/2015)
- (335) "I'm a Cyborg" (12/23/2015)
- (336) "I Had My Cousin's Baby" (12/31/2015)

== Season 19 (2016) ==
- (337) "I Have a Trans Parent" (1/25/2016)
- (338) "I Have a Dangerous Eating Obsession" (2/1/2016)
- (339) "I'm Fighting My Faith" (2/8/2016)
- (340) "I'm Dating with HIV" (2/10/2016)
- (341) "I'm Obsessed with My Ex" (2/15/2016)
- (342) "My Parents Are in Porn" (2/29/2016)
- (343) "I'm Married to a Stranger" (3/7/2016)
- (344) "I'm a Witch" (3/8/2016)
- (345) "I'm on Smart Drugs" (3/14/2016)
- (346) "True Life Presents: Hooked" (5/19/2016)
- (347) "True Life: We Are Orlando" (8/15/2016)
- (348) "I'm a Financial Dom" (10/5/2016)
- (349) "I Have a Feeding Fetish" (10/5/2016)
- (350) "My Parent's Addicted to Opioids" (10/11/2016)
- (351) "I Want To Go Fight ISIS" (10/25/2016)
- (352) "I've Been Shot" (10/25/2016)
- (353) "I'm an Adult Baby" (10/26/2016)
- (354) "I Can't Have an Orgasm" (11/1/2016)
- (355) "I Need Danger Sex" (11/1/2016)
- (356) "I'm a Go-Go God" (11/10/2016)
- (357) "I'm in a Fight Church" (11/10/2016)
- (358) "We Are Transitioning" (11/17/2016)
- (359) "I Have Misophonia" (12/16/2016)
- (360) "I'm Tripping on Ayahuasca" (12/16/2016)
- (361) "I'm Joining a Commune" (12/28/2016)

== Season 20 (2017) ==
- (362) "The Election's Tearing Us Apart" (1/17/2017)
- (363) "I'm Scared For My Future" (1/18/2017)
- (364) "The Economy's Rigged Against Me" (1/19/2017)
- (365) "I Didn't Know I'm a Dad" (6/7/2017)
- (366) "I'm Breaking Beauty Norms" (6/14/2017)
- (367) "I'm Dying For the Applause" (6/14/2017)
- (368) "I'm Gambling For My Future" (6/21/2017)
- (369) "I'm Saving My Hood" (6/21/2017)

== True Life/Now (2019) ==
- (1) "Obsessed with Being a Kardashian" (1/2/2019)
- (2) "Obsessed with the Perfect Booty" (1/9/2019)
- (3) "Obsessed with Looking Like a Snapchat Filter" (1/16/2019)
- (4) "Avenging Revenge Porn" (1/23/2019)

== Quarantine Stories ==
- (1) "First-time First Responders" (6/9/2020)
