= Girlyman =

American folk rock band

Girlyman is an American folk-rock band first based in Brooklyn, New York City, New York, and later based in Atlanta, Georgia. Its 2003 self-released debut album, Remember Who I Am, sold 5,000 copies before it was re-released by Daemon Records, the independent record label run by Amy Ray of the Indigo Girls. Girlyman described its musical style as "harmony-driven gender pop" and "leading-edge three-part harmony folk-pop," and enjoyed a strong following in the gay community.

In late 2012, Girlyman took a hiatus from touring. Greenstein and Borofsky both began work on solo albums, while Muramatsu, Jones, and Borofsky announced they had formed a new group called Django Jones. Greenstein's album One True Thing and Borofsky's Every Wish were released in 2013.

On September 11, 2013, Muramatsu announced that Girlyman had officially disbanded.

In 2014, Django Jones released the children's album D is for Django, and Greenstein announced a new musical act, Mouths of Babes, with her partner Ingrid Elizabeth.

In early 2026, Girlyman announced that the three founding members (Greenstein, Muramatsu, and Borofsky) had reunited and launched the Girlyman Community on Patreon.

== Members ==
Girlyman has had four members:

- Tylan "Ty" Greenstein (vocals, lead guitar, mandolin and percussion)
- Doris Muramatsu (vocals, acoustic guitar, mandolin and bluegrass banjo)
- Nate Borofsky (vocals, baritone guitar, bass guitar)
- JJ Jones (drums and percussion).

The founding members were Greenstein, Muramatsu and Borofsky. Before they came together, Borofsky was an award-winning singer-songwriter, while Greenstein and Muramatsu (best friends since second grade in Princeton Junction, New Jersey) were the award-winning duo The Garden Verge.

In late 2010, Doris Muramatsu was diagnosed with leukemia, which led to the band taking a brief hiatus.

Jones was the drummer for Po' Girl, a group that frequently toured with Girlyman, before joining the group on January 3, 2010. According to the Girlyfan email update (signed by the entire group): "JJ Jones is an old friend and a fantastic drummer whom we've crossed paths with many times over the years, and when we finally got to play with her over the past couple months, something just clicked. Our sound got bigger and closer to what we had all imagined it to be for years." Jones and Doris Muramatsu were romantically involved.

== Discography ==
=== Girlyman ===
- Remember Who I Am

Independently released in fall of 2003, re-released nationally September 7, 2004 on Daemon Records.

- Little Star

Released May 24, 2005 on Daemon Records.

- Joyful Sign

Released nationally on April 13, 2007, with a special edition released earlier to fans; Joyful Sign contains fourteen new original songs, was produced by Girlyman and Bob Harris, and features drummer Joe Chellman.

- Somewhere Different Now (Live)

Released nationally on May 1, 2008; includes previously unreleased songs, tuning songs, and banter from live shows.

- Everything's Easy

Released to pre-order customers in July 2009; release party and concert at Eddie's Attic in Decatur, Georgia, on August 1, 2009.

- Supernova

Released to pre-order customers in November 2011; the CD became generally available on June 19, 2012; the release was supported by a number of shows.

Compilation appearances

- "Amaze Me" on Amaze Me: Songs in the Key of Peace (2003)
- "Viola" on Sounds Like This ... Volume 3 (2004)
- "Young James Dean" on New Arrivals: Volume One (2006)

=== Pre-Girlyman ===
The Garden Verge

- Shadow of a Habit (2001)

Nate Borofsky

- "Never Enough Time" on Oasis Alternative: Volume 16 (date unknown)
- "Beautiful Boy" on Can You Read This, Boston? (1999)
- 500 Miles (1998)
- Powerball (Live EP) (1999)
- Never Enough Time (2000)

== Awards ==
- Winner, Boston Music Awards, 2001 – Best New Singer-Songwriter: Nate Borofsky
- Winner, Outmusic Awards, 2002 – Best New Recording by a Duo, Group, or Band: The Garden Verge, Shadow of a Habit
- Winner, Outmusic Awards, 2004 – Best New Album: Remember Who I Am
- Winner, 3rd Annual Independent Music Awards, 2004 – Song, Folk/Singer-Songwriter Category: "Viola
- Winner, Outmusic Awards, 2006 – Outstanding New Recording-Duo or Group: Little Star

=== Nominations ===
- Top Ten Finalist, Plowshares Songwriting Contest, 2004: Ty Greenstein
- Nominee, 17th Annual GLAAD Media Awards 2006 – Outstanding Music Artist: Little Star
- Nominee, Outmusic Awards, 2006 – OutSong of the Year: "Young James Dean"
- Nominee, Outmusic Awards, 2006 – Outstanding Producer: Bob Harris and Girlyman
- Nominee, Outmusic Awards, 2006 – Outstanding CD Graphic Design: Little Star
- Nominee, 7th Annual Independent Music Awards, 2008 – Folk/Singer-Songwriter Album of the Year: Joyful Sign
