= Remember Who I Am =

Studio album by Girlyman
- Released: 2003
- Genre: Folk rock
- Label: Daemon

Remember Who I Am is Girlyman's first album, independently released in fall of 2003, nationally rereleased September 7, 2004 on Daemon Records.

"Viola" previously appeared on Nate Borofsky's solo album, Never Enough Time.

== Track listing ==
1. Viola (Nate Borofsky) - 3:50
2. Hey Rose (Ty Greenstein) - 3:04
3. Say Goodbye (Doris Muramatsu) - 4:17
4. Fall Stories (Nate Borofsky & Eden Coughlin) - 2:42
5. The Shape I Found You In (Ty Greenstein) - 3:30
6. Maori (Nate Borofsky) 3:25
7. Montpelier (Nate Borofsky) 3:55
8. Even If (Doris Muramatsu) 3:25
9. David (Ty Greenstein) 4:34
10. My Sweet Lord (George Harrison) 3:44
11. Postcards From Mexico (Nate Borofsky & Eden Coughlin) 2:40
12. Amaze Me (Ty Greenstein) 4:10

== Awards ==
- Winner, Independent Music Award, 2004 - Song, Folk/Singer-Songwriter Category: "Viola"
- Winner, Outmusic Award, 2004 - Best New Album
