= Aaron Pike (activist) =

Activist

Aaron Pike (born Aaron Pike Shainwald; also Aaron Pike Schonberg; September 29, 1981, in New York City) is an activist who has appeared in numerous national publications speaking out in favor of same-sex marriage. He is a 2003 graduate of Brandeis University.

== Activism ==
On May 21, 2004, Aaron Pike Shainwald married his long-time boyfriend. The wedding and the events leading up to the wedding were the focus of MTV's True Life: I'm Gay and I'm Getting Married, which aired throughout the 2004 season on the MTV networks around the globe.

Aaron was interviewed in The Advocate, TV Guide, Boston Globe, The New York Times, Metro, Boston Herald's Inside Track, and in several other national and international media outlets. The show aired several times throughout the 2004 MTV season and now currently plays on Logo, MTV's sister channel.

The documentary won the 2005 GLAAD Outstanding Documentary Media award at the 16th GLAAD Media Awards and was accepted by the couple in March 2005 in New York City's Marriott Marquee, Times Square.

In September 2006, Aaron and his husband, Stephen, filed for divorce for irreconcilable differences and the divorce proceedings were finalized on January 18, 2007.

Aaron Pike is also featured in Wendy Diamond’s 2007 documentary In search of Puppy Love, which premiered at the Boston Film Festival.

In April 2008, Aaron Pike was interviewed for the New York Times Magazine cover story “Young Gay Rites”, by Benoit Denizet-Lewis. Aaron was interviewed about his feeling on equal marriage rights and was featured in a full-page photograph by Erwin Olaf.
