= True Life Crime =

American true crime documentary television series

- Genre: True crime; Documentary
- Presented by: Dometi Pongo; Nev Schulman
- Country of origin: United States
- Original language: English
- No. of seasons: 2
- No. of episodes: 18

Production
- Executive producers: Anneka Jones; Banks Tarver; Ben Hurvitz; Jordana Hochman; Lily Neumeyer; Melissa Tallerine; Shawn Cuddy; Todd Radnitz; Brian DeCubellis
- Producers: Kevin Vargas; Spencer Wilking
- Cinematography: Nick Zane Miller; Shlomo Godder; B.J. Golnick; John Kelleran; Joshua Reis
- Editors: Sam Dakil; James Cude; Duncan Adams; Phillip Chernyak; Thomas Hamilton; Allie Keefer; Logan Miller; Sosse Misserlian
- Production companies: Good Caper Content; Karga 7 Pictures; Left-Right Productions

Original release
- Network: MTV
- Release: January 8, 2020 – August 31, 2021

Related
- True Life

True Life Crime is an American true crime documentary television series that premiered on MTV on January 8, 2020.

== Episodes ==
=== Series overview ===
Season	Episodes	Originally released	
Season	Episodes	First released	Last released
1	8	January 8, 2020	February 26, 2020
2	10	July 13, 2021	August 31, 2021

=== Season 1 (2020) ===
No. overall	No. in season	Title	Original release date	U.S. viewers (millions)
1	1	"Tragic Accident or Calculated Murder?"	January 8, 2020	0.51
Case: Death of Kenneka Jenkins
2	2	"Gang Target or Mistaken Identity?"	January 15, 2020	0.42
Case: Murder of Lesandro Guzman-Feliz
3	3	"Killed for Gender Identity? The Kedarie Johnson Case"	January 22, 2020	0.41
Case: Murder of Kedarie Johnson
4	4	"Runaway or Targeted Runner?"	January 29, 2020	0.44
Case: Disappearance of Jerika Binks
5	5	"Skipping School or Silenced Forever?"	February 5, 2020	0.37
Case: Murder of Mujey Dumbuya
6	6	"Suicide or Sinister Plot?"	February 12, 2020	0.33
Case: Death of Sarah Stern
7	7	"The $5 Million Phone Hack"	February 19, 2020	0.26
Case: Joel Ortiz's SIM swap scam
8	8	"Mom Gone Missing: Runaway or Murder Victim?"	February 26, 2020	0.34
Case: Disappearance of Hanna Harris

=== Season 2 (2021) ===
No. overall	No. in season	Title	Original release date	U.S. viewers (millions)
9	1	"Religious Killing or Jealous Rage?"	July 13, 2021	0.21
Case: Murders of Britney Cosby and Crystal Jackson
10	2	"Cliffside Accident or Campsite Killing?"	July 14, 2021	0.19
Case: Death of Lauren Agee
11	3	"Drive By or Deadly Target?"	July 15, 2021	0.20
Case: Murder of Jaydon Chavez Silver
12	4	"Runaway Twin or Twin In Trouble?"	July 20, 2021	0.21
Case: Disappearance of Jholie Moussa
13	5	"Cold Case or Case of Corruption?"	July 27, 2021	0.23
Case: Murder of Heather Bogle
14	6	"Did a Viral Assault Lead to a Murder?"	August 3, 2021	0.24
Case: Murder of Muhlaysia Booker
15	7	"Ohio House of Horrors"	August 10, 2021	0.25
Case: Ashland kidnappings
16	8	"Double Cross or Deadly Deal?"	August 17, 2021	0.34
Case: Murder of D'Anthony Keenan
17	9	"Getting Away with Murder?"	August 24, 2021	0.22
Case: Murder of Mercedes Williamson
18	10	"Justice for Darrien"	August 31, 2021	0.29
Case: Killing of Darrien Hunt
