= Margaret Fischl =

American physician

Margaret Fischl is an American physician, HIV/AIDS researcher, and professor of medicine at the University of Miami. She is notable for being one of the first researchers to discover the effectiveness of the antiretroviral medication azidothymidine (AZT) in treating patents with HIV/AIDS, as well as for helping build the University of Miami's AIDS Clinical Research Unit, of which she served as director. Fischl attended the University of Miami Miller School of Medicine, where she earned her M.D. in 1976, and later served her residency at Jackson Memorial Hospital in Miami.

During AZT's controversial approval process in the United States as the first drug available to combat HIV/AIDS, many saw Fischl as the "face" of the drug and that of its manufacturer, Burroughs Wellcome, and she was the subject of criticism and scrutiny by AIDS activists who were deeply suspicious of the drug's effectiveness and toxicity. However, AZT has since been added to the World Health Organization's List of Essential Medicines and is a component of many HIV/AIDS combination therapies today.
