= True Life =

American documentary television series

- Genre: Documentary
- Narrated by: Su-chin Pak
- Opening theme: "The Gift"
- Country of origin: United States
- Original language: English
- No. of seasons: 21
- No. of episodes: 369 (list of episodes)

Production
- Executive producers: Betsy Forhan; Lauren Lazin; Dave Sirulnick; Jim Fraenkel; Marshall Eisen
- Running time: 42 minutes

Original release
- Network: MTV
- Release: March 31, 1998 – June 21, 2017

Related
- True Life/Now; True Life Crime; True Life Presents: First-Time First Responders; True Life Presents: Quarantine Stories

True Life is an American documentary television series that aired on MTV from March 31, 1998, to June 21, 2017. Each episode follows a particular topic, such as heroin addiction as in the first episode – "Fatal Dose". The show is created by following a series of subjects by a camera crew through a certain part of their lives. A four-episode revival series titled True Life/Now aired in 2019 and a crime investigation iteration called True Life Crime premiered in 2020.

A TV special titled True Life Presents: First-Time First Responders premiered on June 9, 2020.

A four-part docu-series titled True Life Presents: Quarantine Stories premiered on August 5, 2020.

== Topics covered ==
True Life has covered over 140 topics from drug use, money issues, and sexual topics to simple social behavior like visiting the Jersey Shore. The show has aired 18 seasons and 328 episodes so far. There is an occasional intersection between this show and other shows. For example, the episode "I'm a Reality TV Star" featured people from The Real World and Survivor, while the episodes "I'm a Muay Thai Fighter" and "I'm a Mixed Martial Artist" both featured Kit Cope, who has recently signed a deal with the WFA and Frankie Edgar, who was the UFC Lightweight Champion. In the episode "I'm Bisexual," Sydney goes on a date with A.D. from From G's to Gents. In 2011, Sydney was featured in season 6 of Oxygen's Bad Girls Club. Lazar, who was in the episode "I'm in A Love Triangle", was in a 2007 episode of Parental Control.

== Awards and nominations ==
- Won 2009 Emmy Award for Best Special Class Series.
- Won 2000 Image Award for Outstanding News, Talk, or Information Special (For episode "I Am Driving While Black".)
- Won 2005 GLAAD ashleeMedia Award for Outstanding Documentary (For episode "I'm Gay and I'm Getting Married". Accepted by Aaron Pike and Stephen Schonberg)
- True Life: I'm on Crystal Meth Won 2007 Prism Award for TV Teen Series Episode or Special (awarded to Cheryl Horner Sirulnick.)
- Nominated 2000 GLAAD Media Award for Outstanding TV Journalism (For the segment "Matthew's Murder".)
- Nominated 2003 GLAAD Media Award for Outstanding Documentary (For episode "I'm Coming Out.")
- Nominated 2016 GLAAD Media Award for Outstanding TV Journalism - Newsmagazine (For episode "I'm Genderqueer" featuring Jacob Tobia.)
