= El Observador (San Jose) =

Newspaper in San Jose, California

- Type: Weekly newspaper
- Format: Bilingual- English and Spanish
- Owner(s): El Observador Publications Inc. is a 100% Hispanic Owned and Operated Company
- Founder(s): Hilbert and Betty Morales
- Publisher: Angelica Rossi
- President: Angelica Rossi
- Editor: Arturo Hilario
- Founded: September 17, 1980; 45 years ago
- Language: Bilingual, English and Spanish
- Headquarters: 1042 West Hedding Street, Suite 250, San Jose, California 95126; United States
- Circulation: As of 2019, 139,000 Weekly Print and Digital
- Website: https://el-observador.com/
- Free online archives: https://el-observador.com/15724-2/

El Observador (EO) is a weekly bilingual (English and Spanish) print and online newspaper, which has been in business since 1980.

El Observador was the first Bilingual weekly newspaper publication in the San Jose-San Francisco-Oakland Metropolitan Area. Its headquarters are located in San Jose, although it is originally published in San Francisco.

== Description ==
As of 2019, EO was the largest bilingual print and digital weekly newspaper in the Bay Area. It publishes weekly in print, digital newspaper and on its social media platforms.

El Observador partners with many Governments (Federal, State, County and City), Educational Institutions (University, Junior College, Private High Schools, Charter School and Trade Schools) and Business Enterprises, and provides weekly outreach to the growing Hispanic communities in the San Jose-San Francisco-Oakland Metropolitan Area. and English) format.
