= Linda L. Layne =

American anthropologist

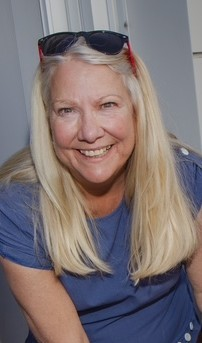

Academic background
- Education: University of Southern California; (B.A); University of Jordan; Cambridge University (M.Phil.); Princeton University (MA, PhD)

Academic work
- Institutions: University of Cambridge
- Main interests: Bodies and Personhood; New Reproductive Technologies; Pregnancy Loss; Consumer Culture; Feminist Technology and Design; Cultures of Parenting; Single Mothers by Choice; Anthropological Approaches to Morality and Ethics; Selfishness / Selflessness
- Website: www.lindallayne.org

Linda Louise Layne (born Burbank, California, 1955) is an American cultural anthropologist, researcher, and author known for her work on reproductive culture, motherhood, pregnancy loss, single motherhood, morality, and feminist theory. She has held academic positions in the United States and the United Kingdom, and her scholarship spans ethnography, family studies, and gender and moral anthropology. Layne’s work has been widely discussed in academic and public contexts, and she is the author or editor of numerous books and journal articles.

In 2011 she became a visiting fellow at the University of Cambridge Centre for Family Research and from 2017-2022, a visiting member of the Reproductive Sociology Research Group (ReproSoc).

== Education and academic career ==
Layne earned a Bachelor of Arts in anthropology and political science from the University of Southern California, followed by an M.Phil. in social anthropology from University of Cambridge and an M.A. and Ph.D. in cultural anthropology and Near Eastern studies from Princeton University. Her doctoral dissertation examined the production and reproduction of tribal identities in Jordan, and resulted in the book Home and Homeland: Dialogics of Tribal and National Identities in Jordan which explored tribal and national identities in the Hashemite Kingdom of Jordan.

From 1993 to 2014, Layne taught at Rensselaer Polytechnic Institute, where she held The Alma and H. Erwin Hale ’30 Professor in Humanities and Social Sciences chair and served as a professor of anthropology and science and technology studies. She later became a visiting fellow at the University of Cambridge Centre for Family Research and later with the Reproductive Sociology Research Group (ReproSoc). She served on the Near East Foundation UK board.

=== State of Mississippi v. Rennie T. Gibbs ===
In 2010, Linda L. Layne contributed her expertise to the legal sphere by filing an amicus curiae brief in the Mississippi Supreme Court case State of Mississippi v. Rennie T. Gibbs (No. 2010-M-819-SCT). The brief, filed on behalf of Legal Voice and pregnancy loss support organizations and experts, supported the appellant, Rennie Gibbs, in an interlocutory appeal challenging her prosecution following a stillbirth.

== Research and scholarly works ==
Layne’s research spans several diverse subjects that are nonetheless instead of interconnected methodologically. Her first field research in Algiers (1977) was funded by an NEH Youthgrant. That project produced a meticulous analysis of one individual, a slum dwelling mother who lived alone with her children and made do with a dense network of informal exchanges while her husband was away working in France. This method is taken up again in her most recent work on one American Single Mother by Choice. It was in Algiers that Layne became acquainted with the French sociologist, Pierre Bourdieu.

A student of Bourdieu’s, the Algerian sociologist Fanny Colona supervised Layne’s work in Algiers. Like Bourdieu, Layne adopted a “hyper-empiricist” approach. As he did in his study of the Kabyle house, Layne documented the placement of bodies and furniture in Jordan in “settled Bedouin” tents and houses, and in the home of a middle class American single mother of three. Like Bourdieu in his book Distinction, Layne documented in minute detail the acquisition and deaccessioning of stuff that entered the single mother by choice’s home.

Layne also experimented with autoethnography. She applied the anthropological lens to her own personal experience of having an infant in a neonatal intensive care unit, focusing on the power of narratives of linear progress.

== Awards ==
Layne has received numerous awards in recognition of her scholarship, teaching, and public engagement. She was honored with the Gracie “Outstanding Talk Show” award from the Foundation of American Women in Radio and Television in 2006, 2007, and 2008 for her programs addressing pregnancy loss, miscarriage, and reproductive justice, including conversations with Lynn Paltrow and Heather Swain.

Her media work was further recognized with Videographer Awards of Excellence, Silver and Bronze Telly Awards, and Silver Davey Awards between 2005 and 2007 for programming on reproductive health, miscarriage, and environmental justice. Layne’s contributions to academic scholarship on motherhood and reproduction were acknowledged by the Council on Anthropology and Reproduction, which awarded her the Best Current Edited Collection Prize in 2005 for Consuming Motherhood. Another of her edited books, Transformative Motherhood : On Giving and Getting in a Consumer Culture won the award for Enduring Influence in 2006.

In 2007, she received the William H. Wiley Distinguished Faculty Award from Rensselaer Polytechnic Institute, and earlier in her career, she earned the Washington Association of Professional Anthropologists Praxis Award in 1987 for her ethnographic research on consumer energy information.

== Selected publications ==
=== Books ===
- 2026 Single Mother by Choice: A Story of Politics and Parenting in Twenty-first Century Middle America. Oxford: Berghahn Books.
- 2003 Motherhood Lost: A Feminist Account of Pregnancy Loss in America, New York: Routledge
- 1994 Home and Homeland: The Dialogics of Tribal and National Identities in Jordan, Princeton: Princeton University Press.

=== Edited volumes and special issues ===
- 2013 Parenting in Global Perspective: Negotiating Ideologies of Kinship, Self and Politics, Charlotte Faircloth, Diane Hoffman and Linda Layne eds. London: Routledge
- 2012 Understanding Reproductive Loss, Sarah Earle, Carol Komaromy, and Linda Layne, eds. Ashgate Press
- 2010 Feminist Technology, Layne, Vostral and Boyer eds. University of Illinois Press
- 2004 Consuming Motherhood, Taylor, Layne and Wozniak eds. New Brunswick: Rutgers University Press. (featured in Oct 2004 Chronicle for Higher Education).
- 1999 Transformative Motherhood: On Giving and Getting in a Consumer Culture, ed. Layne. New York: New York University Press.
- 1998 Anthropological Approaches in Science and Technology Studies Special Issue of Science, Technology and Human Values winter, vol. 23, number 1

=== Articles in refereed journals ===
- 2000 "The Cultural Fix": An Anthropological Contribution to Science and Technology Studies, Science, Technology, and Human Values
- 1996 "How's the baby doing?": Struggling with narratives of progress in a neonatal intensive care unit, PubMed
