= Judith Stacey =

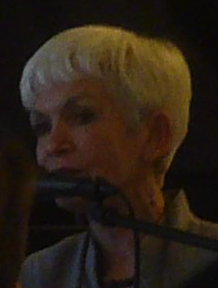
- Born: 1943 (age 82–83)
- Education: Brandeis University
- Occupations: writer, professor, sociologist

Judith G. Stacey (born 1943) is an author and professor emerita of Social and Cultural Analysis and Sociology at New York University. Her primary focus areas include gender, family, sexuality, feminist and queer theory, and ethnography. Her book Unhitched explores family configurations that deviate from the standard Western concept of "marriage", including polygamous families in South Africa, the Mosuo people in southwestern China, and intimacy and parenthood among gay men in Los Angeles, California. She has published many works. She is perhaps most known for her paper, co-authored with Timothy Biblarz, titled "(How) Does the Sexual Orientation of Parents Matter?" This study found that children with gay or lesbian parents "are well-adjusted, have good levels of self-esteem and are as likely to have high educational attainments as children raised in more traditional heterosexual families."

== Life ==
Stacey received her bachelor's degree from the University of Michigan in 1964. She received her Master of Arts in history from the University of Illinois in 1968, and her Ph.D. in sociology from Brandeis University in 1979.

In 1971, Stacey founded the women's studies program at Richmond College (which became the College of Staten Island, City University of New York). She was on the faculty of the University of California, Davis from 1979 to 1997 and was the Streisand Professor of Contemporary Gender Studies and Professor of Sociology at the University of Southern California (1997–2008) before moving to NYU in 2003.

In recognition of her scholarship in Patriarchy and Socialist Revolution in China (1983), Stacey received the American Sociological Association's Jessie Bernard Award for feminist scholarship in 1985.

She has also written for The New York Times and The Nation.

== Selected bibliography ==
=== Books ===
- Unhitched: Love, Marriage, and Family Values from West Hollywood to Western China (2011)
- In The Name Of The Family (1996)
- Brave New Families (1990)
- Patriarchy and Socialist Revolution in China (1983)

=== Journal articles ===
- Biblarz, Timothy J.; Stacey, Judith (2010). "How Does the Gender of Parents Matter?". Journal of Marriage and Family. 72 (1): 3–22. doi:10.1111/j.1741-3737.2009.00678.x. ISSN 1741–3737.
- Stacey, Judith. 1993. “Good Riddance to ‘The Family’: A Response to David Popenoe.” Journal of Marriage and Family 55 (3): 545–47.
- Stacey, Judith (1988). "Can there be a feminist ethnography?". Women's Studies International Forum. 11 (1): 21–27. 1988-01-01. doi:10.1016/0277-5395(88)90004-0. ISSN 0277-5395.
- Stacey, Judith; Thorne, Barrie (1985). “The Missing Feminist Revolution in Sociology.” Social Problems 32 (4): 301–16. doi:10.2307/800754.
