= I'm Gay and I'm Getting Married =

- True Life episode
- Episode no.: Season 5 Episode 1
- Original air date: June 24, 2004
- Running time: 45 minutes

Episode chronology
| ← Previous "I'm on Adderall" | Next → "I'm Obese" |

"I'm Gay and I'm Getting Married" is the first episode of the fifth season of the American television documentary series True Life and the series's 78th episode overall. It featured two gay couples as they apply for marriage licenses and get married in the Commonwealth of Massachusetts. It originally aired on June 24, 2004. The episode follows a gay couple, Aaron Pike and Stephen, and a lesbian couple, Sara and Jessica, who legalize their unions by getting marriage licenses in Massachusetts after they became available on May 17, 2004. The couples, both from Massachusetts, go through all the wedding preparations, from the special celebrations with family to applying and receiving their marriage licenses. Stephen Schonberg claimed that he participated in the documentary to help "gay youths to feel empowered to be true to themselves, despite what others may try to force them to be."

== Awards ==
The documentary won Outstanding Documentary at the 16th GLAAD Media Awards and was accepted by Aaron Pike and Stephen in March 2005 in New York City's Marriott Marquee, Times Square.
