= Digital Library of Georgia =

The Digital Library of Georgia (DLG) is an online public collection of documents and media about the history and culture of the state of Georgia, United States. The collection includes more than a million digitized objects from more than 200 Georgia-related collections. The DLG connects users to content from 65 libraries, archives, museums, historical societies, and other institutions, as well as 100 agencies of state government. It can be searched or browsed through the Digital Library of Georgia website.

Housed at the University of Georgia Libraries, in Athens, the DLG has a production center for digitizing documents, photographs, microfilm, and other media. The DLG website also acts as a portal service, connecting users to related digital collections hosted by partner institutions.

The Digital Library of Georgia is an initiative of GALILEO, Georgia's virtual library, which is administered by the Board of Regents, University System of Georgia.

== Georgia HomePLACE ==
Georgia HomePLACE (Providing Library and Archives Collections Electronically) is a closely connected initiative supporting digitization of family and local history collections held by Georgia's public libraries and allied institutions. Georgia HomePLACE is a partnership between the Georgia Public Library Service and GALILEO and benefits from LSTA funds administered by the Institute of Museum and Library Services. Georgia HomePLACE has produced approximately 25 new DLG digital collections since 2004. Projects of statewide scope include the Vanishing Georgia photographic collection and Sanborn Fire Insurance Maps for Georgia Towns and Cities, 1884-1922. Georgia HomePLACE also sponsors digitization of historical newspapers. The Georgia Historical Records Advisory Board recognized Georgia HomePLACE with its "Documenting Georgia History" award in 2005. The Board of Regents, University System of Georgia recognized the Georgia HomePLACE newspaper digitization effort with the Chancellor's Customer Service Award in 2009.

== Civil Rights Digital Library ==
The Digital Library of Georgia also is a lead partner in the Civil Rights Digital Library (CRDL) initiative, launched in 2008. The goal of the initiative is to promote understanding of the movement for racial equality in the 1950s and 1960s. The CRDL features: 1) a digital archive of historical news footage depicting key events of the movement, 2) Web-based learning objects to provide curricular support and historical context, and 3) a civil rights Web portal connecting users to related digital collections on a national scale. The Civil Rights Digital Library received support through a National Leadership Grant from the Institute of Museum and Library Services.

The Civil Rights Digital Library features a timeline of civil rights events beginning in 1954 through 1968. CRDL also provides background information for past events on the timeline, as well as, archival collections, reference, and educator resources. The CDRL has an A-to-Z list of available collections and contributing institutions.

== Georgia Government Publications Database ==
The Digital Library of Georgia manages digital production for the Georgia Government Publications initiative. The resulting Georgia Government Publications database contains born-digital publications and scanned print documents produced by Georgia state agencies. The GGP provides a comprehensive repository of state publications 1994 to the present, and project participants are actively scanning documents printed before 1994 to provide researchers with a valuable source for online historical research.
