= 16th GLAAD Media Awards =

Annual US media awards ceremonies

The 16th Annual GLAAD Media Awards (2005) were presented at three separate ceremonies: March 28 in New York; April 30 in Los Angeles; and June 11 in San Francisco. The awards were presented to honor "fair, accurate and inclusive" representations of gay individuals in the media.

Billy Crystal was honored with the Excellence in Media Award; given to "individuals in the media and entertainment industries who through their work have increased the visibility and understanding of the LGBT community." Alan Cumming was given the Vito Russo Award; given to "an openly lesbian, gay or bisexual member of the entertainment or media community for outstanding contributions toward eliminating homophobia."

The following is a list of the awards given:

== Special Recognition ==
- Vanguard Award - Liza Minnelli
- Davidson/Valentini Award - Alec Mapa
- Vito Russo Award - Alan Cumming
- Excellence in Media Award - Billy Crystal
- Golden Gate Award - Jennifer Beals
- Stephen F. Kolzak Award - Bill Condon
- Barbara Gittings Award - PlanetOut, Inc.
- Pioneer Award - Hank Plante
- Special Recognition: The Daily Show with Jon Stewart

== Awards ==
(winners in bold)

=== Film Awards ===
- Outstanding Film - Wide Release
  - Alexander (Warner Bros.)
  - A Home at the End of the World (Warner Independent Pictures)
  - **Kinsey** (Fox Searchlight Pictures)
  - Monster (Newmarket Films)
  - Saved! (United Artists)
- Outstanding Film - Limited Release
  - **Bad Education** (Sony Pictures Classics)
  - Bear Cub (TLA Releasing)
  - Blue Gate Crossing (Strand Releasing)
  - Brother to Brother (Wolfe Releasing)
  - The Mudge Boy (Strand Releasing/Showtime)

=== Television Awards ===
- Outstanding Drama Series
  - Kevin Hill (UPN)
  - The L Word (Showtime)
  - Queer as Folk (Showtime)
  - **Six Feet Under** (HBO)
  - The Wire (HBO)
- Outstanding Comedy Series
  - **Will & Grace**
- Outstanding Individual Episode (in a series without a regular gay character)
  - "Daniela", Cold Case (CBS)
  - "It's Raining Men", Cold Case (CBS)
  - **"Lost Boys", Jack & Bobby** (The WB)
  - "Old Flame with a New Wick", Two and a Half Men (CBS)
  - "The Real World Rittenhouse", Strong Medicine (Lifetime)
- Outstanding Television Movie or Mini-Series
  - The Blackwater Lightship (CBS)
  - **Jack** (Showtime)
- Outstanding Reality Program
  - American Candidate (Showtime)
  - Big Brother 5 (CBS)
  - **Queer Eye for the Straight Guy** (Bravo)
  - **The Real World: Philadelphia** (MTV)
  - Survivor: Vanuatu (CBS)
- Outstanding Documentary
  - No Secret Anymore: The Times of Del Martin and Phyllis Lyon (Sundance Channel)
  - The Opposite Sex: Rene's Story (Showtime)
  - Paternal Instinct (Cinemax)
  - Tarnation (Wellspring Media)
  - **True Life: I'm Gay and I'm Getting Married** (MTV)
- Outstanding Daily Drama
  - All My Children (ABC)
  - **One Life to Live** (ABC)
- Outstanding Talk Show Episode
  - **"The 11-Year-Old Who Wants a Sex Change", The Oprah Winfrey Show**
  - "Alan Cumming", The Graham Norton Effect (Comedy Central)
  - "I was Born a Woman...Today I'm a Man", Maury
- Outstanding TV Journalism
  - AIDS: A Pop Culture History (VH1)
  - "Scenes from a Marriage", Dateline NBC (NBC)
  - **"They Didn't Ask, He Didn't Tell", 60 Minutes** (CBS)
  - "Trapped", 48 Hours Investigates (CBS)
  - "Without Mercy", Dateline NBC (NBC)

=== Print ===
- Outstanding Magazine Article
  - "At Home in Two Worlds", by Dirk Johnson and Adam Piore (Newsweek)
  - "Coming Out in Corporate America", by Cliff Edwards (BusinessWeek)
  - "Growing Up With Mom & Mom", by Susan Dominus (The New York Times Magazine)
  - **"Homophobia of All Hues", by Christopher Lisotta** (The Nation)
  - "Should Their Love be Legal?", by Jessica Dulong (CosmoGIRL!)
- Outstanding Magazine Overall Coverage
  - The Chronicle of Higher Education
  - The Nation
  - Newsweek
  - **People**
  - Time
- Outstanding Newspaper Article
  - "Fatherly Love", by Richard A. Marini (San Antonio Express-News)
  - "A Grim Prognosis", by Laura Bond (Westword)
  - **"In the Bible Belt, Acceptance is Hard-Won", by Anne Hull** (The Washington Post)
  - "LAPD Still Biased, Gays Allege", by Nora Zamichow (Los Angeles Times)
  - "Two Brothers, Two Weddings, One Family", by Thomas Farragher and Patricia Wen (Boston Globe)
- Outstanding Newspaper Columnist
  - Ellen Goodman (Boston Globe)
  - Derrick Z. Jackson (Boston Globe)
  - Patrick Moore (Los Angeles Times, Newsday)
  - Deb Price (The Detroit News)
  - **Frank Rich** (The New York Times)
- Outstanding Newspaper Overall Coverage
  - **Boston Globe**
  - The New York Times
  - San Francisco Chronicle
  - The Seattle Times
  - South Florida Sun-Sentinel
- Outstanding Advertising - Print
  - "Are You Putting Us On?" - Kenneth Cole
  - "Jill" - Grand Marnier
  - "Menotte Bracelets" - Cartier
  - "This is Love. It's Not Up for a Vote." - Shreve, Crump & Low
- Outstanding Comic Book
  - Ex Machina (Wildstorm/DC Comics)
  - Hard Time (DC Comics)
  - **Luba** (Fantagraphics Books)
  - My Faith in Frankie (Vertigo/DC Comics)
  - Strangers in Paradise (Abstract Studio)

=== Digital ===
- Outstanding Digital Journalism Article
  - "The Cutting Edge", by Claudia Kolker (Slate.com)
  - **"No Straight Answers", by Randy B. Hecht** (AARP.com)
  - "Rainbow and Red", by Emily Alpert (IntheFray.com)
  - "Sex, Lies and the 'Down Low'", by Whitney Joiner (Salon.com)
  - "Sylvester: Living Proof", by James Earl Hardy (Africana.com)
- Outstanding Advertising - Electronic
  - **"Bouncer" - United Church of Christ**
  - "Coco" - Orbitz
  - "Penn Pals" - Greater Philadelphia Tourism Marketing Corporation
  - "Watch and Learn: Gay Marriage" - MTV

=== Music & Theater ===
- Outstanding Music Artist
  - Melissa Etheridge, Lucky
  - George Michael, Patience
  - **Scissor Sisters, Scissor Sisters**
  - Le Tigre, This Island
  - Rufus Wainwright, Want Two
- Outstanding Los Angeles Theater
  - Last Summer at Bluefish Cove
  - Like a Dog on Linoleum
  - The Paris Letter
  - **Stage Directions**
  - Take Me Out
- Outstanding New York Theater: Broadway and Off-Broadway
  - Bare: A Pop Opera
  - La Cage Aux Folles
  - **The Normal Heart**
  - The Tricky Part
  - Where Do We Live?
- Outstanding New York Theater: Off-Off-Broadway
  - Bald Diva!
  - The Big Voice: God or Merman?
  - **Dog Sees God: Confessions of a Teenage Blockhead**
  - Love According to Luc
  - Us
